= List of United Kingdom by-elections (1918–1931) =

This is a list of parliamentary by-elections in the United Kingdom held between 1918 and 1931, with the names of the incumbent and the victor and of their respective parties. Where a seat was held by a different political party after the election, the result is highlighted: red for a Labour gain, blue for a Conservative gain, orange for a Liberal gain, and grey for any other gain. A total of 233 by-elections were held during this period.

== Resignations ==
See Resignation from the British House of Commons for more details.

Where the cause of by-election is given as "resignation" or "sought re-election", this indicates that the incumbent was appointed on his or her own request to an "office of profit under the Crown", either the Steward of the Chiltern Hundreds or the Steward of the Manor of Northstead. These appointments are made as a constitutional device for leaving the House of Commons, whose Members are not permitted to resign.

== Ministerial by-elections ==
The Succession to the Crown Act 1707 required ministers to seek re-election to the House of Commons on their appointment to office. The Re-Election of Ministers Act 1919 ended the necessity to seek re-election within nine months of a general election, and the Re-Election of Ministers Act (1919) Amendment Act 1926 ended the practice in all other cases.

== By-elections ==
=== 35th Parliament (1929–1931) ===
By-election	Date	Incumbent	Party	Winner	Party	Cause
Guildford	25 August 1931 (Note: An uncontested by-election.) (Note: The Guildford by-election was initially contested but on 25 August the Liberal candidate withdrew, in light of the changed political situation due to the formation of the National Government the previous day.)	Henry Buckingham	Conservative	Charles Rhys	Conservative	Death
Liverpool Wavertree	23 June 1931	John Tinné	Conservative	Ronald Nall-Cain	Conservative	Resignation
Manchester Ardwick	22 June 1931	Thomas Lowth	Labour	Joseph Henderson	Labour	Death
Gateshead	8 June 1931	James Melville	Labour	Herbert Evans	Labour	Death
Rutherglen	21 May 1931	William Wright	Labour	David Hardie	Labour	Death
Stroud	21 May 1931	Sir Frank Nelson	Conservative	Walter Perkins	Conservative	Resignation
Ogmore	19 May 1931	Vernon Hartshorn	Labour	Edward Williams	Labour	Death
Glasgow St Rollox	7 May 1931	James Stewart	Labour	William Leonard	Labour	Death
Scarborough and Whitby	6 May 1931	Sidney Herbert	Conservative	Paul Latham	Conservative	Resignation
Ashton-under-Lyne	30 April 1931 (Note: Retained at the 1931 general election.)	Albert Bellamy	Labour	John Broadbent	Conservative	Death
Woolwich East	15 April 1931	Henry Snell	Labour	George Hicks	Labour	Elevation to the peerage
Sunderland	26 March 1931 (Note: Sunderland was a two-member constituency. Both MPs were won by Labour at the 1929 general election and by the Conservatives at the 1931 general election.)	Alfred Smith	Labour	Luke Thompson	Conservative	Death
Pontypridd	19 March 1931	Thomas Mardy Jones	Labour	David Lewis Davies	Labour	Resignation
Westminster St George's	19 March 1931	Laming Worthington-Evans	Conservative	Duff Cooper	Conservative	Death
Salisbury	11 March 1931	Hugh Morrison	Conservative	James Despencer-Robertson	Conservative	Resignation
Fermanagh and Tyrone	7 March 1931	Thomas Harbison	Nationalist	Cahir Healy	Nationalist	Death
Fareham	20 February 1931	John Davidson	Conservative	Thomas Inskip	Conservative	Resignation
Islington East	19 February 1931	Ethel Bentham	Labour	Leah Manning	Labour	Death
Liverpool East Toxteth	5 February 1931	Henry Mond	Conservative	Patrick Buchan-Hepburn	Conservative	Succession to the peerage
Bristol East	16 January 1931	Walter Baker	Labour	Stafford Cripps	Labour	Death
Whitechapel and St George's	3 December 1930	Harry Gosling	Labour	J. H. Hall	Labour	Death
East Renfrewshire	28 November 1930	Alexander MacRobert	Conservative	Douglas Douglas-Hamilton	Conservative	Death
Shipley	6 November 1930	William Mackinder	Labour	James Lockwood	Conservative	Death
Paddington South	30 October 1930 (Note: Taylor joined the Conservative Party in 1931, holding the seat at the 1931 general election.)	Douglas King	Conservative	Ernest Taylor	Empire Crusade	Death
Bromley	2 September 1930	Cuthbert James	Conservative	Edward Campbell	Conservative	Death
North Norfolk	9 July 1930	Noel Buxton	Labour	Lucy Noel-Buxton	Labour	Elevation to the peerage
Glasgow Shettleston	26 June 1930	John Wheatley	Labour	John McGovern	Labour	Death
Nottingham Central	27 May 1930	Albert Bennett	Conservative	Terence O'Connor	Conservative	Resignation
Fulham West	6 May 1930	Ernest Spero	Labour	Cyril Cobb	Conservative	Resignation
Sheffield Brightside	6 February 1930	Arthur Ponsonby	Labour	Fred Marshall	Labour	Elevated to the peerage
Liverpool Scotland	14 December 1929 (Note: A rare case of a gain in an unopposed election. O'Connor had an ad hoc group of supporters in the constituency who helped his campaign at election times, and Logan had been extensively involved in the Irish nationalist movement in his youth.)	T. P. O'Connor	Irish Parliamentary	David Logan	Labour	Death
Tamworth	2 December 1929	Edward Iliffe	Conservative	Arthur Steel-Maitland	Conservative	Resignation
Kilmarnock	27 November 1929	Robert Climie	Labour	Craigie Aitchison	Labour	Death
Twickenham	8 August 1929	William Joynson-Hicks	Conservative	John Ferguson	Conservative	Elevated to the peerage
Leeds South East	1 August 1929	Henry Slesser	Labour	James Milner	Labour	Resignation
Preston	31 July 1929 (Note: Preston was a two-member constituency. Jowitt was appointed Attorney General for England and Wales in the Labour government and opted to seek re-election in his new party colours. In 1931 he became a National Labour MP; but he did not re-contest Preston at the 1931 general election, for he could not secure the withdrawal of Conservative candidates supporting the National Government, who took both seats.)	William Jowitt	Liberal	William Jowitt	Labour	Sought re-election upon change of party allegiance
=== 34th Parliament (1924–1929) ===
By-election	Date	Incumbent	Party	Winner	Party	Cause
North Lanarkshire	21 March 1929 (Note: Gain retained at the 1929 general election.)	Alexander Sprot	Conservative	Jennie Lee	Labour	Death
Holland with Boston	21 March 1929	Arthur Dean	Conservative	James Blindell	Liberal	Death
Bath	21 March 1929	Charles Foxcroft	Conservative	Charles Baillie-Hamilton	Conservative	Death
Eddisbury	20 March 1929	Harry Barnston	Conservative	R. J. Russell	Liberal	Death
Liverpool East Toxteth	19 March 1929	Albert Jacob	Conservative	Henry Mond	Conservative	Death
Wansbeck	13 February 1929	George Warne	Labour	George Shield	Labour	Death
Bishop Auckland	7 February 1929	Ben Spoor	Labour	Ruth Dalton	Labour	Death
Battersea South	7 February 1929	Francis Curzon	Conservative	William Bennett	Labour	Succession to the peerage
Londonderry	29 January 1929 (Note: An uncontested election.)	Malcolm Macnaghten	UUP	Ronald Ross	UUP	Appointment as High Court judge
Midlothian and Peeblesshire Northern	29 January 1929 (Note: Gain not retained at the 1929 general election.)	George Hutchison	Conservative	Andrew Clarke	Labour	Death
Ashton-under-Lyne	29 October 1928	Cornelius Homan	Conservative	Albert Bellamy	Labour	Declared bankrupt
Tavistock	11 October 1928	Philip Kenyon-Slaney	Conservative	Wallace Duffield Wright	Conservative	Death
Cheltenham	26 September 1928	James Agg-Gardner	Conservative	Walter Preston	Conservative	Death
Aberdeen North	16 August 1928	Frank Rose	Labour	William Wedgwood Benn	Labour	Death
Sheffield Hallam	16 July 1928	Frederick Sykes	Conservative	Louis Smith	Conservative	Appointed Governor of Bombay
Halifax	13 July 1928 (Note: Prior to his elevation to Speaker of the House of Commons, John Henry Whitley had been a Liberal MP.)	John Henry Whitley	Speaker	Arthur Longbottom	Labour	Resignation (retired as Speaker)
Epsom	4 July 1928	George Blades	Conservative	Archibald Southby	Conservative	Elevation to the peerage
Carmarthen	28 June 1928 (Note: Alfred Mond was elected at the 1924 general election as a Liberal but moved to the Conservative Party in Parliament. The Liberals re-took his seat at the by-election but lost it to Labour at the 1929 general election.)	Alfred Mond	Liberal/Conservative	William Nathaniel Jones	Liberal	Elevation to the Hereditary Peerage
Holborn	28 June 1928	James Remnant	Conservative	Stuart Bevan	Conservative	Elevation to the peerage
St Marylebone	30 April 1928	Sir Douglas Hogg	Conservative	Rennell Rodd	Conservative	Appointed Lord Chancellor
Hanley	23 April 1928	Samuel Clowes	Labour	Arthur Hollins	Labour	Death
Linlithgowshire	4 April 1928	James Kidd	Conservative	Manny Shinwell	Labour	Death
Middlesbrough West	7 March 1928	Trevelyan Thomson	Liberal	F. Kingsley Griffith	Liberal	Death
St Ives	6 March 1928	Anthony Hawke	Conservative	Hilda Runciman	Liberal	Appointment as a High Court Judge
Ilford	23 February 1928	Fredric Wise	Conservative	George Hamilton	Conservative	Death
Lancaster	9 February 1928	Gerald Strickland	Conservative	Robert Parkinson Tomlinson	Liberal	Elevation to the Hereditary Peerage
Bristol West	2 February 1928	George Gibbs	Conservative	Cyril Culverwell	Conservative	Elevation to the peerage
Faversham	25 January 1928	Granville Wheler	Conservative	Adam Maitland	Conservative	Death
Northampton	9 January 1928	Arthur Holland	Conservative	Cecil L'Estrange Malone	Labour	Death
Canterbury	24 November 1927	Ronald McNeill	Conservative	William Wayland	Conservative	Elevation to the peerage
Southend	19 November 1927	Rupert Guinness	Conservative	Gwendolen Guinness	Conservative	Succession to the peerage
Brixton	27 June 1927	Davison Dalziel	Conservative	Nigel Colman	Conservative	Elevation to the peerage
Westbury	16 June 1927	Walter William Shaw	Conservative	Richard Long	Conservative	Death
Bosworth	31 May 1927	Robert Gee	Conservative	William Edge	Liberal	Resignation
Combined Scottish Universities	26–29 April 1927	Henry Craik	Conservative	John Buchan	Conservative	Death
Southwark North	28 March 1927 (Note: Haden-Guest left the Labour Party and sought re-election as a Constitutionalist, but the seat was gained by the Liberal Party. At the 1929 general election the seat was regained by the Labour Party.)	Leslie Haden-Guest	Labour	Edward Strauss	Liberal	Sought re-election as a Constitutionalist
Leith	23 March 1927	William Wedgwood Benn	Liberal	Ernest Brown	Liberal	Resignation
Stourbridge	23 February 1927	Douglas Pielou	Conservative	Wilfred Wellock	Labour	Death
Smethwick	21 December 1926	John Davison	Labour	Oswald Mosley	Labour	Resignation
Chelmsford	30 November 1926	Henry Curtis-Bennett	Conservative	Charles Howard-Bury	Conservative	Resignation
Kingston-upon-Hull Central	29 November 1926	Joseph Kenworthy	Liberal	Joseph Kenworthy	Labour	Sought re-election upon change of party allegiance
Howdenshire	25 November 1926	Stanley Jackson	Conservative	William Carver	Conservative	Resignation
North Cumberland	17 September 1926	Donald Howard	Conservative	Fergus Graham	Conservative	Succession to the peerage
Wallsend	21 July 1926	Patrick Hastings	Labour	Margaret Bondfield	Labour	Resignation
Hammersmith North	20 May 1926	Ellis Ashmead-Bartlett	Conservative	James Patrick Gardner	Labour	Resignation
Buckrose	5 May 1926	Guy Gaunt	Conservative	Albert Braithwaite	Conservative	Resignation
East Ham North	29 April 1926	Charles Williamson Crook	Conservative	Susan Lawrence	Labour	Death
Bothwell	26 March 1926	John Robertson	Labour	Joseph Sullivan	Labour	Death
Combined English Universities	8–12 March 1926 (Note: The Combined English Universities was a two-member constituency. At the 1924 general election it elected one Conservative and one Liberal. The Conservatives gained the Liberal seat in 1926, but at the 1929 general election the two seats were won by one Conservative and one Independent (Eleanor Rathbone).)	Herbert Albert Laurens Fisher	Liberal	Alfred Hopkinson	Conservative	Resignation
Darlington	17 February 1926	William Edwin Pease	Conservative	Arthur Lewis Shepherd	Labour	Death
Cambridge University	13 February 1926 (Note: An uncontested election.)	John Rawlinson	Conservative	John James Withers	Conservative	Death
East Renfrewshire	29 January 1926	Alexander Munro MacRobert	Conservative	Alexander Munro MacRobert	Conservative	Appointed Solicitor General for Scotland
Dunbartonshire	29 January 1926	David Fleming	Conservative	John Thom	Conservative	Appointed to the Court of Session
Ripon	5 December 1925	Edward Wood	Conservative	John Waller Hills	Conservative	Resignation
Bury St Edmunds	1 December 1925	Walter Guinness	Conservative	Walter Guinness	Conservative	Appointed Minister of Agriculture and Fisheries
Galloway	17 November 1925	Arthur Henniker-Hughan	Conservative	Sidney Streatfield	Conservative	Death
Stockport	17 September 1925 (Note: Stockport was a two-member constituency. At the 1924 general election it elected two Conservative MPs. One seat was lost to the Labour Party at the 1926 by-election. At the 1929 general election the Conservative and Labour parties won one seat apiece.)	William Greenwood	Conservative	Arnold Townend	Labour	Death
Forest of Dean	14 July 1925	James Wignall	Labour	A. A. Purcell	Labour	Death
Oldham	24 June 1925	Edward Grigg	Liberal	William Wiggins	Liberal	Resignation
Eastbourne	17 June 1925	George Lloyd	Conservative	William Reginald Hall	Conservative	Resignation
Ayr Burghs	12 June 1925	John Baird	Conservative	Thomas Moore	Conservative	Appointed Governor-General of Australia
Walsall	27 February 1925	William Preston	Conservative	William Preston	Conservative	Disqualification
Dundee	22 December 1924	E. D. Morel	Labour	Thomas Johnston	Labour	Death
=== 33rd Parliament (1923–1924) ===
By-election	Date	Incumbent	Party	Winner	Party	Cause
Carmarthen	14 August 1924	Ellis Ellis-Griffith	Liberal	Alfred Mond	Liberal	Resignation
Holland with Boston	31 July 1924 (Note: Gain retained at the 1924 general election.)	William Royce	Labour	Arthur Dean	Conservative	Death
Lewes	9 July 1924	William Campion	Conservative	Tufton Beamish	Conservative	Appointment as Governor of Western Australia
Oxford	5 June 1924	Frank Gray	Liberal	Robert Bourne	Conservative	Election declared void
Glasgow Kelvingrove	23 May 1924	William Hutchison	Conservative	Walter Elliot	Conservative	Death
Liverpool West Toxteth	22 May 1924	Robert Houston	Conservative	Joseph Gibbins	Labour	Resignation
Westminster Abbey	19 March 1924	John Nicholson	Conservative	Otho Nicholson	Conservative	Death
Dover	12 March 1924 (Note: An uncontested by-election.)	John Astor	Conservative	John Astor	Conservative	Voted before taking the Oath of Allegiance
Burnley	28 February 1924	David Irving	Labour	Arthur Henderson	Labour	Death
City of London	1 February 1924	Frederick Banbury	Conservative	Vansittart Bowater	Conservative	Elevation to the peerage
=== 32nd Parliament (1922–1923) ===
By-election	Date	Incumbent	Party	Winner	Party	Cause
Yeovil	30 October 1923	Aubrey Herbert	Conservative	George Davies	Conservative	Death
Rutland and Stamford	30 October 1923	Charles Harvey Dixon	Conservative	Neville Smith-Carington	Conservative	Death
Portsmouth South	13 August 1923	Leslie Orme Wilson	Conservative	Herbert Cayzer	Conservative	Resignation
Leeds Central	26 July 1923	Arthur Wellesley Willey	Conservative	Charles Henry Wilson	Conservative	Death
Tiverton	21 June 1923 (Note: Gain retained at the 1923 general election.)	Herbert Sparkes	Conservative	Francis Dyke Acland	Liberal	Death
Morpeth	21 June 1923	John Cairns	Labour	Robert Smillie	Labour	Death
Berwick-upon-Tweed	31 May 1923	Hilton Philipson	National Liberal	Mabel Philipson	Conservative	Void election (electoral fraud)
Ludlow	19 April 1923	Ivor Windsor-Clive	Conservative	George Windsor-Clive	Conservative	Succession to the peerage
Anglesey	7 April 1923	Owen Thomas	Independent Labour	Robert Thomas	Liberal	Death
Liverpool Edge Hill	6 March 1923	William Rutherford	Conservative	Jack Hayes	Labour	Resignation
Mitcham	3 March 1923 (Note: Gain not retained at the 1923 general election.)	Thomas Worsfold	Conservative	James Chuter Ede	Labour	Resignation
Willesden East	3 March 1923	Harry Mallaby-Deeley	Conservative	Harcourt Johnstone	Liberal	Resignation
Darlington	28 February 1923	Herbert Pease	Conservative	William Edwin Pease	Conservative	Elevation to the peerage
Whitechapel and St George's	8 February 1923	Charles Mathew	Labour	Harry Gosling	Labour	Death
Newcastle-upon-Tyne East	17 January 1923	Joseph Nicholas Bell	Labour	Arthur Henderson	Labour	Death
Portsmouth South	13 December 1922	Herbert Cayzer	Conservative	Leslie Wilson	Conservative	Resignation
=== 31st Parliament (1919–1922) === Some precise party allegiances during this Parliament are difficult to determine, for the Liberal and Conservative parties were both divided over whether or not to continue support for the Lloyd George Coalition Government. Some opponents of the Coalition ran and/or sat as Independent Liberals or Conservatives respectively; however, other opponents were able to secure official nominations. It is not always clear exactly where an individual MP or officially endorsed candidate stood on the issue of the Coalition at the point of election; several appear to have given ambiguous information at the time, or to have switched wings once in Parliament.
By-election	Date	Incumbent	Party	Winner	Party	Cause
Newport (Monmouthshire)	18 October 1922 (Note: Gain retained at the 1922 general election.)	Lewis Haslam	National Liberal	Reginald Clarry	Conservative	Death
Hackney South	18 August 1922 (Note: Horatio Bottomley was expelled from the Commons following his imprisonment for fraud. The by-election was won by Clifford Erskine-Bolst as a Conservative candidate supporting the Coalition; after the Coalition fell, Erskine-Bolst retained the seat for the Conservative Party at the 1922 general election.)	Horatio Bottomley	Independent	Clifford Erskine-Bolst	Coalition Conservative	Expelled from the House (convicted of fraud)
Pontypridd	25 July 1922	Thomas Arthur Lewis	National Liberal	Thomas Isaac Mardy Jones	Labour	Appointed as a Junior Lord of the Treasury
North Down	21 July 1922 (Note: An uncontested by-election.)	Henry Wilson	UUP	John Simms	UUP	Death (assassinated by IRA)
Gower	20 July 1922	John Williams	Labour	David Grenfell	Labour	Death
Nottingham East	29 June 1922	John David Rees	Coalition Conservative	John Houfton	Coalition Conservative	Death
Banbury	22 June 1922	Rhys Rhys-Williams	National Liberal	Rhys Rhys-Williams	National Liberal	Appointed Recorder of Cardiff
Moray and Nairn	21 June 1922	Archibald Williamson	National Liberal	Thomas Maule Guthrie	National Liberal	Elevation to the peerage
Newbury	10 June 1922	William Mount	Coalition Conservative	Howard Clifton Brown	Coalition Conservative	Resignation
North Londonderry	4 June 1922	Hugh T. Barrie	UUP	Malcolm Macnaghten	UUP	Death
City of London	19 May 1922	Arthur Balfour	Coalition Conservative	Edward Grenfell	Coalition Conservative	Elevation to the peerage
Clapham	9 May 1922	Arthur du Cros	Coalition Conservative	John Leigh	Coalition Conservative	Resignation
Leicester East	30 March 1922 (Note: Gain not retained at the 1922 general election.)	Gordon Hewart	National Liberal	George Banton	Labour	Appointment as Lord Chief Justice of England and Wales
Chertsey	24 March 1922	Donald MacMaster	Coalition Conservative	Philip Richardson	Coalition Conservative	Death
Inverness	16 March 1922	Thomas Brash Morison	National Liberal	Murdoch MacDonald	National Liberal	Resignation
Cambridge	16 March 1922	Eric Geddes	Coalition Conservative	George Newton	Coalition Conservative	Resignation
Liverpool Exchange	13 March 1922	Leslie Scott	Coalition Conservative	Leslie Scott	Coalition Conservative	Appointed as Solicitor General
Wolverhampton West	7 March 1922	Alfred Bird	Coalition Conservative	Robert Bird	Coalition Conservative	Death
Bodmin	24 February 1922	Charles Hanson	Coalition Conservative	Isaac Foot	Liberal	Death
North Down	21 February 1922	Thomas Watters Brown	UUP	Henry Wilson	UUP	Appointed to the High Court of Northern Ireland
Camberwell North	20 February 1922	Henry Newton Knights	Coalition Conservative	Charles Ammon	Labour	Resignation (bankruptcy)
Manchester Clayton	18 February 1922	Edward Hopkinson	Coalition Conservative	John Edward Sutton	Labour	Death
West Down	17 February 1922	Thomas Browne Wallace	UUP	Hugh Hayes	UUP	Appointed Chief Clerk to the High Court of Northern Ireland
South Londonderry	18 January 1922	Robert Chichester	UUP	William Pain	UUP	Death
Tamworth	17 January 1922	Henry Wilson-Fox	Coalition Conservative	Percy Newson	Coalition Conservative	Death
Ludlow	4 January 1922	Beville Stanier	Coalition Conservative	Ivor Windsor-Clive	Coalition Conservative	Death
Southwark South East	14 December 1921 (Note: The seat was regained at the 1922 general election by the National Liberals, as the Coalition Liberals were restyled following the end of the Coalition.)	James Dawes	National Liberal	Thomas Naylor	Labour	Death
Hornsey	10 November 1921	Kennedy Jones	Conservative	William Ward	Conservative	Death
Westhoughton	5 October 1921	William Wilson	Labour	Rhys Davies	Labour	Death
Louth	22 September 1921	Thomas Wintringham	Liberal	Margaret Wintringham	Liberal	Death
Lewisham West	13 September 1921	Edward Coates	Conservative	Philip Dawson	Conservative	Death
South Londonderry	29 August 1921	Denis Henry	UUP	Robert Chichester	UUP	Appointed Lord Chief Justice of Northern Ireland
Westminster Abbey	25 August 1921	William Burdett-Coutts	Conservative	John Sanctuary Nicholson	Conservative	Death
Caerphilly	24 August 1921	Alfred Onions	Labour	Morgan Jones	Labour	Death
Hertford	16 July 1921	Noel Pemberton Billing	Independent	Murray Sueter	Anti-Waste League and Independent	Resignation (ill-health)
Heywood and Radcliffe	8 June 1921	Albert Illingworth	National Liberal	Walter Halls	Labour	Elevation to the peerage
Westminster St George's	7 July 1921 (Note: Erskine was the nominee of the Anti-Waste League. At the 1922 general election he was also supported by the St. George's, Hanover Square, Independent Conservative Association, which was in dispute with the official Conservative Association in the constituency. During the 1922–1923 Parliament, Erskine began to sit as an official Conservative; he retained the seat as such in subsequent elections.)	Walter Long	Coalition Conservative	James Erskine	Anti-Waste League	Elevation to the peerage
West Down	5 July 1921	Daniel Martin Wilson	UUP	Thomas Browne Wallace	UUP	Appointed Recorder of Belfast
Mid Down	2 July 1921	James Craig	UUP	Robert Sharman-Crawford	UUP	Elected Prime Minister of Northern Ireland
Mid Armagh	23 June 1921	James Lonsdale	UUP	Henry Armstrong	UUP	Death
Belfast Duncairn	23 June 1921	Edward Carson	UUP	Thomas McConnell	UUP	Appointed Lord of Appeal in Ordinary
North Down	23 June 1921	Thomas Watters Brown	UUP	Thomas Watters Brown	UUP	Appointed Solicitor-General for Ireland
Orkney and Shetland	17 May 1921	Cathcart Wason	National Liberal	Malcolm Smith	National Liberal	Death
Abingdon	14 May 1921	John Tyson Wigan	Coalition Conservative	Arthur Loyd	Coalition Conservative	Resignation
Penrith and Cockermouth	13 May 1921	James Lowther	Coalition Conservative	Cecil Lowther	Coalition Conservative	Resignation
Hastings	4 May 1921	Laurance Lyon	Coalition Conservative	Eustace Percy	Coalition Conservative	Resignation
Chichester	23 April 1921	Edmund Talbot	Coalition Conservative	William Bird	Coalition Conservative	Resignation
Bedford	23 April 1921	Frederick Kellaway	National Liberal	Frederick Kellaway	National Liberal	Appointed Postmaster General
Bewdley	19 April 1921	Stanley Baldwin	Coalition Conservative	Stanley Baldwin	Coalition Conservative	Appointed President of the Board of Trade
Eddisbury	19 April 1921	Harry Barnston	Coalition Conservative	Harry Barnston	Coalition Conservative	Appointed Comptroller of the Household
East Dorset	16 April 1921	Frederick Guest	National Liberal	Frederick Guest	National Liberal	Appointed Secretary of State for Air
Glasgow Pollok	14 April 1921	John Gilmour	Coalition Conservative	John Gilmour	Coalition Conservative	Appointed Junior Lord of the Treasury
Bristol West	9 April 1921	George Gibbs	Coalition Conservative	George Gibbs	Coalition Conservative	Appointed Treasurer of the Household
Taunton	8 April 1921	Dennis Boles	Coalition Conservative	Arthur Griffith-Boscawen	Coalition Conservative	Resignation
Birmingham West	31 March 1921	Austen Chamberlain	Coalition Conservative	Austen Chamberlain	Coalition Conservative	Appointed Lord Privy Seal
Penistone	5 March 1921	Sydney Arnold	Liberal	William Gillis	Labour	Resignation
Kirkcaldy Burghs	4 March 1921	Henry Dalziel	National Liberal	Tom Kennedy	Labour	Resignation
Birmingham Moseley	4 March 1921	Hallewell Rogers	Coalition Conservative	Patrick Hannon	Coalition Conservative	Resignation
Dudley	3 March 1921	Arthur Griffith-Boscawen	Coalition Conservative	James Wilson	Labour	Appointment as Minister of Agriculture
Woolwich East	2 March 1921	Will Crooks	Labour	Robert Gee	Coalition Conservative	Death
Cardiganshire	18 February 1921	Matthew Vaughan-Davies	National Liberal	Ernest Evans	National Liberal	Elevated to the peerage
Dover	12 January 1921 (Note: At the time of his election Polson was supported by Horatio Bottomley, who formed the Independent Parliamentary Group in Parliament. Shortly after being elected he joined the newly formed Anti-Waste League. He unsuccessfully defended his seat at the 1922 general election as an Independent Conservative, losing to an official Conservative candidate.)	Vere Ponsonby	Coalition Conservative	Thomas Polson	Independent	Succession to the Peerage
Hereford	11 January 1921	Charles Pulley	Coalition Conservative	Samuel Roberts	Coalition Conservative	Resignation
Abertillery	21 December 1920	William Brace	Labour	George Barker	Labour	Resignation
Rhondda West	21 December 1920	William Abraham	Labour	William John	Labour	Resignation
Middleton and Prestwich	22 November 1920	Ryland Adkins	National Liberal	Ryland Adkins	National Liberal	Appointed Recorder of Birmingham
The Wrekin	20 November 1920 (Note: The Wrekin experienced two by-elections in 1920. Both Charles Palmer and C. V. F. Townshend were supported by Horatio Bottomley, and once in Parliament they joined his Independent Parliamentary Group. The seat was won by the Coalition Liberals at the 1918 general election and by the Conservatives at the 1922 general election.)	Charles Palmer	Independent	Charles Townshend	Independent	Death
Hemel Hempstead	9 November 1920	Gustavus Talbot	Coalition Conservative	J. C. C. Davidson	Coalition Conservative	Death
Ilford	25 September 1920	Peter Griggs	Coalition Conservative	Fredric Wise	Coalition Conservative	Death
Woodbridge	28 July 1920	Robert Francis Peel	Coalition Conservative	Arthur Churchman	Coalition Conservative	Resignation
South Norfolk	27 July 1920 (Note: George Edwards gained South Norfolk from the Liberals, but lost to the Conservatives at the 1922 general election.)	William Cozens-Hardy	National Liberal	George Edwards	Labour	Succession to the peerage
Ebbw Vale	26 July 1920	Thomas Richards	Labour	Evan Davies	Labour	Resignation
Nelson and Colne	17 June 1920	Albert Smith	Labour	Robinson Graham	Labour	Resignation
Louth	3 June 1920 (Note: Thomas Wintringham died later in the Parliament, and Louth was retained for the Liberals by his widow Margaret at the second by-election, the 1922 general election and the 1923 general election.)	Langton Brackenbury	Coalition Conservative	Thomas Wintringham	Liberal	Death
Sunderland	24 April 1920	Hamar Greenwood	National Liberal	Hamar Greenwood	National Liberal	Appointed Chief Secretary for Ireland
Edinburgh North	9 April 1920	James Avon Clyde	Coalition Conservative	Patrick Ford	Coalition Conservative	Resignation
Edinburgh South	9 April 1920	Charles Murray	Coalition Conservative	Charles Murray	Coalition Conservative	Appointed Solicitor General for Scotland
Northampton	1 April 1920	Charles McCurdy	National Liberal	Charles McCurdy	National Liberal	Appointed Minister of Food Control
Basingstoke	31 March 1920	Auckland Geddes	Coalition Conservative	Arthur Holbrook	Coalition Conservative	Resignation
Camberwell North West	31 March 1920	Thomas Macnamara	National Liberal	Thomas Macnamara	National Liberal	Appointed Minister of Labour
Dartford	27 March 1920 (Note: John Edmund Mills won Dartford from the Coalition Liberals, but lost to George William Symonds Jarrett, running as a Constitutionalist at the 1922 general election.)	James Rowlands	National Liberal	John Edmund Mills	Labour	Death
Stockport	27 March 1920	Spencer Leigh Hughes	National Liberal	Henry Fildes	National Liberal	Death
Stockport	27 March 1920	George Wardle	Coalition Labour	William Greenwood	Coalition Conservative	Resignation
Argyll	10 March 1920	William Sutherland	National Liberal	William Sutherland	National Liberal	Appointed as a Junior Lord of the Treasury
Horncastle	25 February 1920	William Weigall	Coalition Conservative	Stafford Vere Hotchkin	Coalition Conservative	Appointed Governor of South Australia
Paisley	12 February 1920	John Mills McCallum	Liberal	H. H. Asquith	Liberal	Death
The Wrekin	7 February 1920	Charles Solomon Henry	National Liberal	Charles Frederick Palmer	Independent	Death
Ashton-under-Lyne	31 January 1920	Albert Stanley	Coalition Conservative	Walter de Frece	Coalition Conservative	Elevation to the peerage
Spen Valley	20 December 1919 (Note: Spen Valley was taken from the Coalition Liberals by Labour due to the intervention of an anti-Coalition official Liberal. At the 1922 general election the anti-Coalition Liberal gained the seat.)	Thomas Whittaker	National Liberal	Tom Myers	Labour	Death
Bromley	17 December 1919	Henry Forster	Coalition Conservative	Cuthbert James	Coalition Conservative	Elevation to the peerage
St Albans	10 December 1919	Hildred Carlile	Coalition Conservative	Francis Fremantle	Coalition Conservative	Resignation
Plymouth Sutton	28 November 1919	Waldorf Astor	Coalition Conservative	Nancy Astor	Coalition Conservative	Succession to the peerage
Isle of Thanet	15 November 1919	Norman Carlyle Craig	Conservative	Esmond Harmsworth	Conservative	Death
Croydon South	14 November 1919	Ian Malcolm	Coalition Conservative	Allan Smith	Coalition Conservative	Resignation
Chester-le-Street	13 November 1919	John Wilkinson Taylor	Labour	Jack Lawson	Labour	Resignation
Manchester Rusholme	7 October 1919	Robert Burdon Stoker	Coalition Conservative	John Henry Thorpe	Coalition Conservative	Death
Pontefract	6 September 1919	Joseph Compton-Rickett	National Liberal	Walter Forrest	National Liberal	Death
Widnes	30 August 1919	William Walker	Coalition Conservative	Arthur Henderson	Labour	Elevation to the peerage
Dublin University	28 July 1919	Arthur Samuels	Irish Unionist	William Jellett	Irish Unionist	Appointed to the High Court of Justice in Ireland
Bothwell	16 July 1919	David Macdonald	Coalition Conservative	John Robertson	Labour	Death
Swansea East	10 July 1919	Thomas Jeremiah Williams	National Liberal	David Matthews	National Liberal	Death
East Antrim	27 May 1919 (Note: Due to the establishment of the Parliament of Northern Ireland, the number of constituencies for Northern Ireland was substantially reduced from the 1922 general election. East Antrim was absorbed into the larger two-member Antrim constituency, which at the 1922 election was won by two official Ulster Unionists.)	Robert McCalmont	Irish Unionist	George Hanna	Ind. Unionistnionist	Appointed Commander of the Irish Guards
Aberdeenshire and Kincardineshire Central	16 April 1919	Alexander Theodore Gordon	Coalition Conservative	Murdoch McKenzie Wood	Liberal	Death
Kingston upon Hull Central	29 March 1919	Mark Sykes	Coalition Conservative	Joseph Kenworthy	Liberal	Death
Oxford University	19–24 March 1919	Rowland Prothero	Coalition Conservative	Charles Oman	Coalition Conservative	Elevation to the peerage
North Londonderry	4 March 1919	Hugh Anderson	Irish Unionist	Hugh T. Barrie	Irish Unionist	Resignation
Leyton West	1 March 1919	Harry Wrightson	Coalition Conservative	Alfred Newbould	Liberal	Death
Liverpool West Derby	26 February 1919	Sir F. E. Smith	Coalition Conservative	William Reginald Hall	Coalition Conservative	Appointed Lord Chancellor
