= List of MPs elected in the 1922 United Kingdom general election =

1922–1923 Parliament of the United Kingdom
←	1918–1922 Parliament	1923–1924 Parliament	→
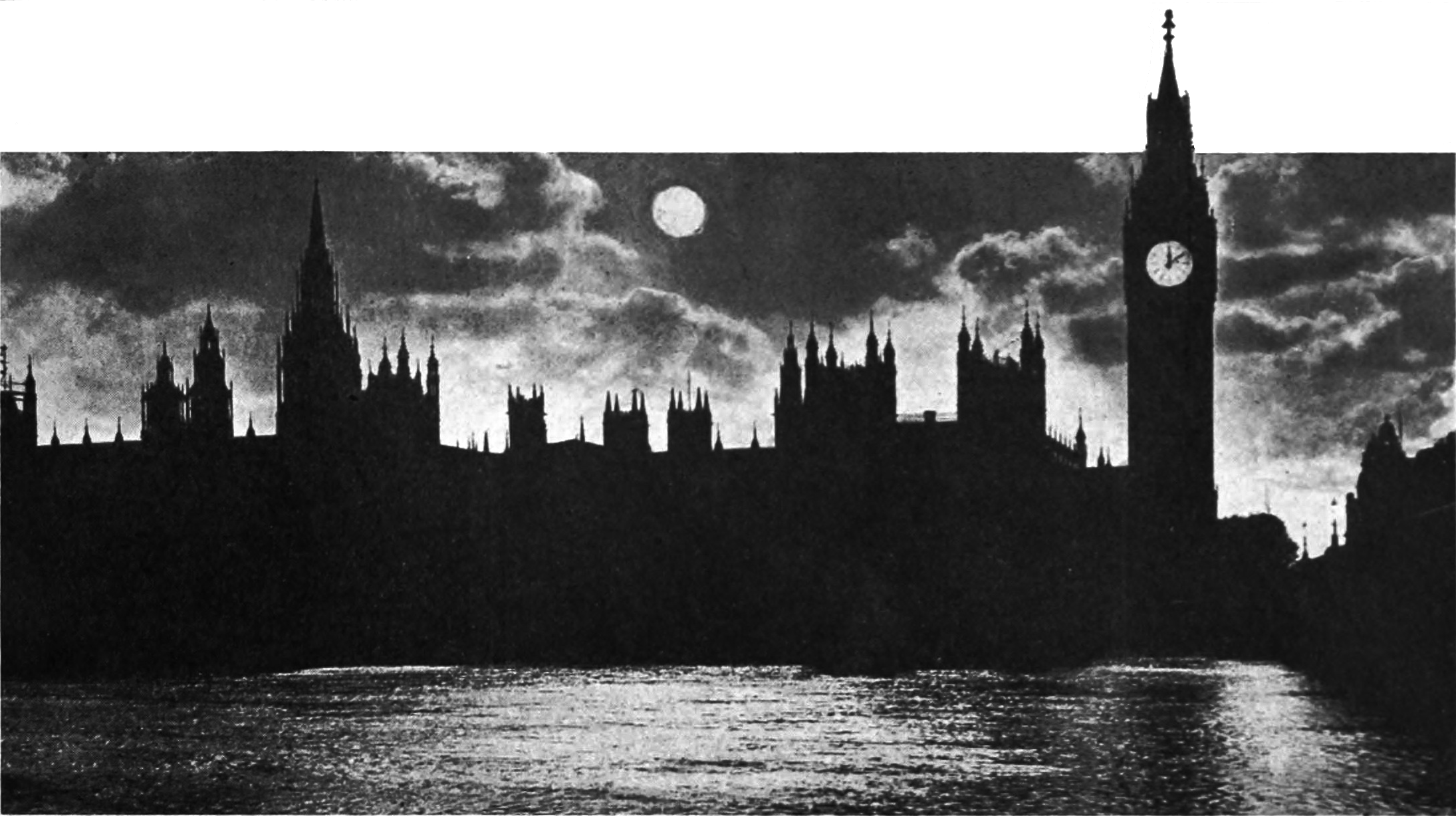
- Palace of Westminster in 1922

Overview
- Legislative body: Parliament of the United Kingdom
- Term: 15 November 1922 – 6 December 1923
- Election: 1922 United Kingdom general election
- Government: Law ministry

House of Commons
- Members: 615
- Speaker: John Henry Whitley
- Leader: Bonar Law (1922—1923); Stanley Baldwin (from 1923)
- Prime Minister: Bonar Law (1922—1923); Stanley Baldwin (from 1923)
- Leader of the Opposition: Ramsay MacDonald
- Third-party leader: H. H. Asquith

House of Lords
- Lord Chancellor: George Cave, 1st Viscount Cave
- Leader of the House of Lords: George Curzon, 1st Marquess Curzon of Kedleston

Crown-in-Parliament George V

Sessions
- 1st: 20 November 1922 – 15 December 1922
- 2nd: 13 February 1923 – 16 November 1923

This is a list of members of Parliament elected at the 1922 general election, held on 15 November. For a complete list of constituency elections results, see Constituency election results in the 1922 United Kingdom general election. Future Labour Prime Minister Clement Attlee was elected for the first time.

Table of contents:

A B C D E F G H I J K L M N O P Q R S T U V W X Y Z By-elections Changes

== A ==
Constituency	MP	Party
Aberavon	Ramsay MacDonald	Labour
Aberdare	George Hall	Labour
Aberdeen North	Frank Rose	Labour
Aberdeen South	Frederick Thomson	Conservative
Aberdeenshire Central	Murdoch McKenzie Wood	Liberal
Aberdeenshire East	Frederick Martin	Liberal
Aberdeenshire West and Kincardine	Hon. Arthur Murray	Liberal
Abertillery	George Barker	Labour
Abingdon	Arthur Loyd	Conservative
Accrington	Charles Buxton	Labour
Acton	Sir Harry Brittain	Conservative
Aldershot	Viscount Wolmer	Conservative
Altrincham	Sir George Hamilton	Conservative
Anglesey	Sir Owen Thomas	Independent Labour
Antrim (Two members)	Charles Craig	Ulster Unionist
Antrim (Two members)	Hon. Hugh O'Neill	Ulster Unionist
Armagh	Sir William Allen	Ulster Unionist
Argyll	Sir William Sutherland	National Liberal
Ashford	Samuel Strang Steel	Conservative
Ashton-under-Lyne	Sir Walter de Frece	Conservative
Aylesbury	Lionel de Rothschild	Conservative
Ayr Burghs	Sir John Baird, Bt	Conservative
Ayrshire North and Bute	Aylmer Hunter-Weston	Conservative
Ayrshire South	James Brown	Labour
== B ==
Balham and Tooting	Sir Alfred Butt	Conservative
Banbury	Albert Edmondson	Conservative
Banffshire	Charles Barrie	Liberal
Barkston Ash	George Lane-Fox	Conservative
Barnard Castle	John Rogerson	Conservative
Barnsley	John Potts	Labour
Barnstaple	Basil Peto	Conservative
Barrow-in-Furness	Daniel Somerville	Conservative
Basingstoke	Sir Arthur Holbrook	Conservative
Bassetlaw	Sir William Hume-Williams	Conservative
Bath	Charles Foxcroft	Conservative
Batley and Morley	Ben Turner	Labour
Battersea North	Shapurji Saklatvala	Labour
Battersea South	Francis Curzon	Conservative
Bedford	Richard Wells	Conservative
Bedfordshire Mid	Frederick Linfield	Liberal
Bedwellty	Charles Edwards	Labour
Belfast, East	Herbert Dixon	Ulster Unionist
Belfast, North	Thomas McConnell	Ulster Unionist
Belfast, South	Thomas Moles	Ulster Unionist
Belfast, West	Sir Robert Lynn	Ulster Unionist
Belper	John Hancock	Liberal
Bermondsey West	Alfred Salter	Labour
Berwick and Haddington	Walter Waring	National Liberal
Berwick-on-Tweed	Hilton Philipson	National Liberal
Bethnal Green North-East	Garnham Edmonds	Liberal
Bethnal Green South-West	Percy Harris	Liberal
Bewdley	Stanley Baldwin	Conservative
Birkenhead East	Graham White	Liberal
Birkenhead West	William Henry Stott	Conservative
Birmingham Aston	Evelyn Cecil	Conservative
Birmingham Deritend	Smedley Crooke	Conservative
Birmingham Duddeston	Sir Ernest Hiley	Conservative
Birmingham Edgbaston	Sir Francis Lowe, Bt	Conservative
Birmingham Erdington	Sir Arthur Steel-Maitland, Bt	Conservative
Birmingham Handsworth	Oliver Locker-Lampson	Conservative
Birmingham King's Norton	Sir Herbert Austin	Conservative
Birmingham Ladywood	Neville Chamberlain	Conservative
Birmingham Moseley	Sir Patrick Hannon	Conservative
Birmingham Sparkbrook	Leo Amery	Conservative
Birmingham West	Sir Austen Chamberlain	Conservative
Birmingham Yardley	Alfred Jephcott	Conservative
Bishop Auckland	Ben Spoor	Labour
Blackburn (Two members)	Sir Sydney Henn	Conservative
Blackburn (Two members)	Sir Henry Norman, Bt	National Liberal
Blackpool	Leonard Molloy	Conservative
Blaydon	William Whiteley	Labour
Bodmin	Isaac Foot	Liberal
Bolton (Two members)	William Russell	Conservative
Bolton (Two members)	William Edge	National Liberal
Bootle	James Burnie	Liberal
Bosworth	Guy Paget	Conservative
Bothwell	John Robertson	Labour
Bournemouth	Sir Henry Page Croft	Conservative
Bow and Bromley	George Lansbury	Labour
Bradford Central	William Leach	Labour
Bradford East	Fred Jowett	Labour
Bradford North	Archibald Boyd-Carpenter	Conservative
Bradford South	Herbert Harvey Spencer	Liberal
Brecon and Radnor	William Jenkins	National Liberal
Brentford and Chiswick	Walter Morden	Conservative
Bridgwater	Robert Sanders	Conservative
Brigg	Sir Berkeley Sheffield, Bt	Conservative
Brighton (Two members)	Sir Cooper Rawson	Conservative
Brighton (Two members)	George Tryon	Conservative
Bristol Central	Thomas Inskip	Conservative
Bristol East	Harold Morris	National Liberal
Bristol North	Henry Guest	National Liberal
Bristol South	Sir Beddoe Rees	National Liberal
Bristol West	George Gibbs	Conservative
Brixton	Davison Dalziel	Conservative
Bromley	Hon. Cuthbert James	Conservative
Broxtowe	George Spencer	Labour
Buckingham	George Bowyer	Conservative
Buckrose	Sir Guy Gaunt	Conservative
Burnley	Dan Irving	Labour
Burslem	Andrew MacLaren	Labour
Burton	John Gretton	Conservative
Bury	Charles Ainsworth	Conservative
Bury St Edmunds	Hon. Walter Guinness	Conservative
== C ==
Caerphilly	Morgan Jones	Labour
Caithness and Sutherland	Sir Archibald Sinclair, Bt	National Liberal
Camberwell North	Charles Ammon	Labour
Camberwell North-West	Thomas Macnamara	National Liberal
Camborne	Algernon Moreing	National Liberal
Cambridge	Sir George Newton	Conservative
Cambridgeshire	Harold Gray	Conservative
Cambridge University (Two members)	J. R. M. Butler	Independent Liberal
Cambridge University (Two members)	John Rawlinson	Conservative
Cannock	William Adamson	Labour
Canterbury	Ronald McNeill	Conservative
Cardiff Central	James Childs Gould	Conservative
Cardiff East	Lewis Lougher	Conservative
Cardiff South	Sir James Cory, Bt	Conservative
Cardiganshire	Ernest Evans	National Liberal
Carlisle	George Middleton	Labour
Carmarthen	John Hinds	National Liberal
Carnarvon	David Lloyd George	National Liberal
Carnarvonshire	Robert Jones	Labour
Chatham	John Moore-Brabazon	Conservative
Chelmsford	E. G. Pretyman	Conservative
Chelsea	Sir Samuel Hoare, Bt	Conservative
Cheltenham	Sir James Agg-Gardner	Conservative
Chertsey	Philip Richardson	Conservative
Chester	Sir Charles Cayzer, Bt	Conservative
Chesterfield	Barnet Kenyon	Liberal
Chester-le-Street	Jack Lawson	Labour
Chichester	Sir William Bird	Conservative
Chippenham	Alfred Bonwick	Liberal
Chislehurst	Robert Nesbitt	Conservative
Chorley	Douglas Hacking	Conservative
Cirencester and Tewkesbury	Sir Thomas Davies	Conservative
City of London (Two members)	Sir Frederick Banbury, Bt	Conservative
City of London (Two members)	Edward Grenfell	Conservative
Clapham	Sir John Leigh, Bt	Conservative
Clay Cross	Charles Duncan	Labour
Cleveland	Park Goff	Conservative
Clitheroe	Sir William Brass	Conservative
Coatbridge	James C. Welsh	Labour
Colchester	Sir Laming Worthington-Evans, Bt	Conservative
Colne Valley	Philip Snowden	Labour
Combined English Universities (Two members)	Sir Martin Conway	Conservative
Combined English Universities (Two members)	H. A. L. Fisher	National Liberal
Combined Scottish Universities (Three members)	Dugald Cowan	Liberal
Combined Scottish Universities (Three members)	Sir Henry Craik	Conservative
Combined Scottish Universities (Three members)	Sir George Berry	Conservative
Consett	Herbert Dunnico	Labour
Cornwall North	Sir George Marks	National Liberal
Coventry	Edward Manville	Conservative
Crewe	Edward Hemmerde	Labour
Croydon North	Glyn Mason	Conservative
Croydon South	Sir Allan Smith	Conservative
Cumberland North	Hon. Donald Howard	Conservative
== D ==
Darlington	Herbert Pease	Conservative
Dartford	George Jarrett	Constitutionalist
Darwen	Sir Frank Sanderson, Bt	Conservative
Daventry	Hon. Edward FitzRoy	Conservative
Denbigh	John Cledwyn Davies	National Liberal
Deptford	C. W. Bowerman	Labour
Derby (Two members)	J. H. Thomas	Labour
Derby (Two members)	Charles Roberts	Liberal
Derbyshire North-East	Frank Lee	Labour
Derbyshire South	Henry Lorimer	Conservative
Derbyshire West	Charles Frederick White	Liberal
Devizes	Cory Bell	Conservative
Dewsbury	Benjamin Riley	Labour
Doncaster	Wilfred Paling	Labour
Don Valley	Tom Williams	Labour
Dorset East	Gordon Hall Caine	Independent Conservative
Dorset North	John Emlyn-Jones	Liberal
Dorset South	Robert Yerburgh	Conservative
Dorset West	Philip Colfox	Conservative
Dover	Hon. John Astor	Conservative
Down (Two members)	David Reid	Ulster Unionist
Down (Two members)	John Simms	Ulster Unionist
Dudley	Cyril Lloyd	Conservative
Dulwich	Sir Frederick Hall	Conservative
Dumbarton Burghs	David Kirkwood	Labour
Dunbartonshire	William Raeburn	Conservative
Dumfriesshire	William Chapple	Liberal
Dundee (Two members)	E. D. Morel	Labour
Dundee (Two members)	Edwin Scrymgeour	Scottish Prohibition
Dunfermline Burghs	William McLean Watson	Labour
Durham	Joshua Ritson	Labour
== E ==
Ealing	Sir Herbert Nield	Conservative
Eastbourne	Rupert Gwynne	Conservative
East Grinstead	Henry Cautley	Conservative
East Ham North	Charles Crook	Conservative
East Ham South	Alfred Barnes	Labour Co-op
Ebbw Vale	Evan Davies	Labour
Eccles	John Buckle	Labour
Eddisbury	Harry Barnston	Conservative
Edinburgh Central	William Graham	Labour
Edinburgh East	James Hogge	Liberal
Edinburgh North	Patrick Ford	Conservative
Edinburgh South	Samuel Chapman	Conservative
Edinburgh West	Vivian Phillipps	Liberal
Edmonton	Frank Broad	Labour
Elland	William C. Robinson	Labour
Enfield	Thomas Fermor-Hesketh	Conservative
Epping	Richard Colvin	Conservative
Epsom	Sir Rowland Blades, Bt	Conservative
Essex South East	Frank Hilder	Conservative
Evesham	Bolton Eyres-Monsell	Conservative
Exeter	Sir Robert Newman, Bt	Conservative
Eye	Alexander Lyle-Samuel	Liberal
== F ==
Fareham	Sir John Davidson	Conservative
Farnham	Arthur Samuel	Conservative
Farnworth	Thomas Greenall	Labour
Faversham	Granville Wheler	Conservative
Fermanagh and Tyrone (Two members)	Thomas Harbison	Irish Nationalist
Fermanagh and Tyrone (Two members)	Cahir Healy	Irish Nationalist
Fife East	Sir James Duncan Millar	Liberal
Fife West	William Adamson	Labour
Finchley	John Pretyman Newman	Conservative
Finsbury	Martin Archer-Shee	Conservative
Flintshire	Tom Parry	National Liberal
Forest of Dean	James Wignall	Labour
Forfarshire	James Falconer	Liberal
Frome	Percy Hurd	Conservative
Fulham East	Sir Kenyon Vaughan-Morgan	Conservative
Fulham West	Sir Cyril Cobb	Conservative
Fylde	Edward Stanley	Conservative
== G ==
Gainsborough	John Molson	Conservative
Galloway	Cecil Dudgeon	Liberal
Gateshead	John Brotherton	Labour
Gillingham	Sir Gerald Hohler	Conservative
Glasgow Bridgeton	James Maxton	Labour
Glasgow Camlachie	Campbell Stephen	Labour
Glasgow Cathcart	John Primrose Hay	Labour
Glasgow Central	Bonar Law	Conservative
Glasgow Gorbals	George Buchanan	Labour
Glasgow Govan	Neil Maclean	Labour
Glasgow Hillhead	Sir Robert Horne	Conservative
Glasgow Kelvingrove	William Hutchison	Conservative
Glasgow Maryhill	John Muir	Labour
Glasgow Partick	Sir John Collie	National Liberal
Glasgow Pollok	Sir John Gilmour, Bt	Conservative
Glasgow St. Rollox	James Stewart	Labour
Glasgow Shettleston	John Wheatley	Labour
Glasgow Springburn	George Hardie	Labour
Glasgow Tradeston	Thomas Henderson	Labour Co-op
Gloucester	Sir James Bruton	Conservative
Gower	David Grenfell	Labour
Grantham	Robert Pattinson	Liberal
Gravesend	Alexander Richardson	Conservative
Great Yarmouth	Arthur Harbord	Liberal
Greenock	Sir Godfrey Collins	Liberal
Greenwich	George Hume	Conservative
Grimsby	Tom Sutcliffe	Conservative
Guildford	Sir Henry Buckingham	Conservative
== H ==
Hackney Central	Sir Arthur Lever, Bt	National Liberal
Hackney North	Sir Walter Greene	Conservative
Hackney South	Clifford Erskine-Bolst	Conservative
Halifax	John Henry Whitley	Liberal
Hamilton	Duncan Graham	Labour
Hammersmith North	Sir Henry Foreman	Conservative
Hammersmith South	Sir William Bull, Bt	Conservative
Hampstead	George Balfour	Conservative
Hanley	Harper Parker	Labour
Harborough	Sir Keith Fraser, Bt	Conservative
Harrow	Oswald Mosley	Independent
The Hartlepools	William Jowitt	Liberal
Harwich	Albert Ernest Hillary	Liberal
Hastings	Eustace Percy	Conservative
Hemel Hempstead	John Davidson	Conservative
Hemsworth	John Guest	Labour
Hendon	Philip Lloyd-Greame	Conservative
Henley	Reginald Terrell	Conservative
Hereford	Samuel Roberts	Conservative
Hertford	Sir Murray Sueter	Conservative
Hexham	Clifton Brown	Conservative
Heywood and Radcliffe	Abraham England	National Liberal
High Peak	Sir Samuel Hill-Wood, Bt	Conservative
Hitchin	Robert Cecil	Conservative
Holborn	James Remnant	Conservative
Holderness	Audley Bowdler	Liberal
Holland-with-Boston	William Royce	Labour
Honiton	Clive Morrison-Bell	Conservative
Horncastle	Samuel Pattinson	Liberal
Hornsey	Viscount Ednam	Conservative
Horsham and Worthing	The Earl Winterton	Conservative
Houghton-le-Spring	Robert Richardson	Labour
Howdenshire	Hon. Stanley Jackson	Conservative
Huddersfield	Sir Arthur Marshall	Liberal
Huntingdonshire	Charles Murchison	Conservative
Hythe	Sir Philip Sassoon, Bt	Conservative
== I ==
Ilford	Sir Fredric Wise	Conservative
Ilkeston	George Oliver	Labour
Ince	Stephen Walsh	Labour
Inverness	Sir Murdoch Macdonald	National Liberal
Ipswich	John Ganzoni	Conservative
Isle of Ely	Norman Coates	Conservative
Isle of Thanet	Hon. Esmond Harmsworth	Conservative
Isle of Wight	Sir Edgar Chatfeild-Clarke	Liberal
Islington East	Austin Hudson	Conservative
Islington North	Sir Newton Moore	Conservative
Islington South	Charles Garland	Conservative
Islington West	James Despencer-Robertson	Conservative
== J ==
Jarrow	Robert John Wilson	Labour
== K ==
Keighley	Hastings Lees-Smith	Labour
Kennington	Francis Capel Harrison	Conservative
Kensington North	Percy Gates	Conservative
Kensington South	Sir William Davison	Conservative
Kettering	Owen Parker	Conservative
Kidderminster	Sir John Wardlaw-Milne	Conservative
Kilmarnock	Hon. Alexander Shaw	Liberal
King's Lynn	Sir Neville Jodrell	Conservative
Kingston upon Hull Central	Hon. Joseph Kenworthy	Liberal
Kingston upon Hull East	Roger Lumley	Conservative
Kingston upon Hull North West	Lambert Ward	Conservative
Kingston upon Hull South West	Cyril Entwistle	Liberal
Kingston-upon-Thames	Sir Frederick Penny	Conservative
Kingswinford	Charles Sitch	Labour
Kinross & West Perthshire	James Gardiner	National Liberal
Kirkcaldy District of Burghs	Sir Robert Hutchison	National Liberal
Knutsford	Sir Ernest Makins	Conservative
== L ==
Lambeth North	Frank Briant	Liberal
Lanark	Walter Elliot	Conservative
Lanarkshire North	Joseph Sullivan	Labour
Lancaster	John Singleton	Conservative
Leeds Central	Arthur Willey	Conservative
Leeds North	Hugh Butler	Conservative
Leeds North East	Sir John Birchall	Conservative
Leeds South	Henry Charleton	Labour
Leeds South East	James O'Grady	Labour
Leeds West	John Murray	Liberal
Leek	William Bromfield	Labour
Leicester East	Arthur Evans	National Liberal
Leicester South	William Reynolds	Conservative
Leicester West	Alfred Hill	Labour
Leigh	Henry Twist	Labour
Leith	William Wedgwood Benn	Liberal
Leominster	Ernest Shepperson	Conservative
Lewes	William Campion	Conservative
Lewisham East	Sir Assheton Pownall	Conservative
Lewisham West	Sir Philip Dawson	Conservative
Leyton East	Ernest Alexander	Conservative
Leyton West	James Cassels	Conservative
Lichfield	Sir Courtenay Warner, Bt	National Liberal
Lincoln	Alfred Davies	Conservative
Linlithgow	Manny Shinwell	Labour
Liverpool Edge Hill	William Rutherford	Conservative
Liverpool Everton	John Harmood-Banner	Conservative
Liverpool Exchange	Sir Leslie Scott	Conservative
Liverpool Fairfield	Jack Cohen	Conservative
Liverpool Kirkdale	De Fonblanque Pennefather	Conservative
Liverpool Scotland	T. P. O'Connor	Irish Nationalist
Liverpool East Toxteth	James Stuart Rankin	Conservative
Liverpool West Toxteth	Sir Robert Houston, Bt	Conservative
Liverpool Walton	Sir Warden Chilcott	Conservative
Liverpool Wavertree	Sir Harold Smith	Conservative
Liverpool West Derby	Sir Reginald Hall	Conservative
Llandaff and Barry	William Cope	Conservative
Llanelli	John Henry Williams	Labour
Londonderry	Sir Malcolm Macnaghten	Ulster Unionist
London University	Sir Sydney Russell-Wells	Conservative
Lonsdale	Capt Nigel Kennedy	Conservative
Loughborough	Louis Spears	National Liberal
Louth	Margaret Wintringham	Liberal
Lowestoft	Sir Gervais Rentoul	Conservative
Ludlow	Viscount Windsor	Conservative
Luton	Sir John Hewett	Conservative
== M ==
Macclesfield	John Remer	Conservative
Maidstone	Carlyon Bellairs	Conservative
Maldon	Edward Ruggles-Brise	Conservative
Manchester Ardwick	Thomas Lowth	Labour
Manchester Blackley	Harold Briggs	Conservative
Manchester Clayton	William Flanagan	Conservative
Manchester Exchange	Sir Edwin Stockton	Conservative
Manchester Gorton	John Hodge	Labour
Manchester Hulme	Joseph Nall	Conservative
Manchester Moss Side	Gerald Hurst	Conservative
Manchester Platting	J. R. Clynes	Labour
Manchester Rusholme	John Henry Thorpe	Conservative
Manchester Withington	Thomas Watts	Conservative
Mansfield	Albert Bennett	Liberal
Melton	Sir Charles Yate, Bt	Conservative
Merioneth	Sir Henry Haydn Jones	Liberal
Merthyr	R. C. Wallhead	Labour
Middlesbrough East	John Wesley Brown	Conservative
Middlesbrough West	Trevelyan Thomson	Liberal
Middleton and Prestwich	Sir Ryland Adkins	National Liberal
Midlothian North	George Hutchison	Conservative
Midlothian South and Peebles	Joseph Westwood	Labour
Mitcham	Thomas Worsfold	Conservative
Monmouth	Leolin Forestier-Walker	Conservative
Montgomery	David Davies	Liberal
Montrose Burghs	John Sturrock	National Liberal
Moray & Nairn	Thomas Maule Guthrie	National Liberal
Morpeth	John Cairns	Labour
Mossley	Austin Hopkinson	Independent
Motherwell	Walton Newbold	Communist
== N ==
Neath	Sir William Jenkins	Labour
Nelson and Colne	Arthur Greenwood	Labour
Newark	The Marquess of Titchfield	Conservative
Newbury	Howard Clifton Brown	Conservative
Newcastle-under-Lyme	Josiah Wedgwood	Labour
Newcastle-upon-Tyne Central	Charles Trevelyan	Labour
Newcastle-upon-Tyne East	Joseph Nicholas Bell	Labour
Newcastle-upon-Tyne North	Nicholas Grattan-Doyle	Conservative
Newcastle-upon-Tyne West	David Adams	Labour
New Forest and Christchurch	Wilfrid Ashley	Conservative
Newport	Reginald Clarry	Conservative
Newton	Robert Young	Labour
Norfolk East	Michael Falcon	Conservative
Norfolk North	Noel Buxton	Labour
Norfolk South	Thomas William Hay	Conservative
Norfolk South West	Richard Winfrey	National Liberal
Normanton	Frederick Hall	Labour
Northampton	Charles McCurdy	National Liberal
Northwich	Lord Colum Crichton-Stuart	Conservative
Norwich (Two members)	George Roberts	Independent
Norwich (Two members)	Hilton Young	National Liberal
Norwood	Sir Walter Greaves-Lord	Conservative
Nottingham Central	Reginald Berkeley	Liberal
Nottingham East	John Houfton	Conservative
Nottingham South	Lord Henry Cavendish-Bentinck	Conservative
Nottingham West	Arthur Hayday	Labour
Nuneaton	Sir Henry Maddocks	Conservative
== O ==
Ogmore	Vernon Hartshorn	Labour
Oldham (Two members)	Edward Grigg	National Liberal
Oldham (Two members)	William John Tout	Labour
Orkney and Shetland	Sir Robert Hamilton	Liberal
Ormskirk	Francis Blundell	Conservative
Oswestry	William Bridgeman	Conservative
Oxford	Frank Gray	Liberal
Oxford University (Two members)	Hugh Cecil	Conservative
Oxford University (Two members)	Sir Charles Oman	Conservative
== P ==
Paddington North	Sir William Perring	Conservative
Paddington South	Douglas King	Conservative
Paisley	H. H. Asquith	Liberal
Peckham	Collingwood Hughes	Conservative
Pembrokeshire	Gwilym Lloyd George	National Liberal
Penistone	William Pringle	Liberal
Penrith and Cockermouth	Levi Collison	Liberal
Penryn and Falmouth	Denis Shipwright	Conservative
Perth	Noel Skelton	Conservative
Peterborough	Henry Brassey	Conservative
Petersfield	William Graham Nicholson	Conservative
Plymouth Devonport	Sir Clement Kinloch-Cooke	Conservative
Plymouth Drake	Sir Arthur Benn	Conservative
Plymouth Sutton	Nancy Astor	Conservative
Pontefract	Tom Smith	Labour
Pontypool	Thomas Griffiths	Labour
Pontypridd	Thomas Mardy Jones	Labour
Poplar South	Samuel March	Labour
Portsmouth Central	Frank Privett	Conservative
Portsmouth North	Sir Bertram Falle, Bt	Conservative
Portsmouth South	Herbert Cayzer	Conservative
Preston (Two members)	James Hodge	Liberal
Preston (Two members)	Thomas Shaw	Labour
Pudsey and Otley	Frederick Fawkes	Conservative
Putney	Samuel Samuel	Conservative
== Q ==
Queen's University of Belfast	Sir William Whitla	Ulster Unionist
== R ==
Reading	Hon. Edward Cadogan	Conservative
Reigate	George Cockerill	Conservative
Renfrewshire, East	Robert Nichol	Labour
Renfrewshire, West	Robert Murray	Labour
Rhondda East	David Watts-Morgan	Labour
Rhondda West	William John	Labour
Richmond (Yorkshire)	Sir Murrough Wilson	Conservative
Richmond upon Thames	Harry Becker	Independent Conservative
Ripon	Hon. Edward Wood	Conservative
Rochdale	Stanley Burgess	Labour
Romford	Albert Edward Martin	National Liberal
Ross and Cromarty	Ian Macpherson	National Liberal
Rossendale	David Halstead	Conservative
Rotherham	Frederic Kelley	Conservative
Rotherhithe	John Lort-Williams	Conservative
Rother Valley	Thomas Grundy	Labour
Rothwell	William Lunn	Labour
Roxburgh and Selkirk	Sir Thomas Henderson	National Liberal
Royton	Sir Wilfrid Sugden	Conservative
Rugby	Euan Wallace	Conservative
Rushcliffe	Sir Henry Betterton	Conservative
Rutherglen	William Wright	Labour
Rutland and Stamford	Charles Harvey Dixon	Conservative
Rye	George Courthope	Conservative
== S ==
Saffron Walden	William Foot Mitchell	Conservative
St Albans	Sir Francis Fremantle	Conservative
St Helens	Sir James Sexton	Labour
St Ives	Anthony Hawke	Conservative
St Marylebone	Sir Douglas Hogg	Conservative
St Pancras North	John Lorden	Conservative
St Pancras South East	John Hopkins	Conservative
St Pancras South West	Richard Barnett	Conservative
Salford North	Ben Tillett	Labour
Salford South	Anderson Barlow	Conservative
Salford West	Fred Astbury	Conservative
Salisbury	Hugh Morrison	Conservative
Scarborough and Whitby	Sidney Herbert	Conservative
Seaham	Sidney Webb	Labour
Sedgefield	John Herriotts	Labour
Sevenoaks	Sir Thomas Jewell Bennett	Conservative
Sheffield Attercliffe	Cecil Wilson	Labour
Sheffield, Brightside	Arthur Ponsonby	Labour
Sheffield, Central	James Hope	Conservative
Sheffield, Ecclesall	Sir Samuel Roberts, Bt	Conservative
Sheffield, Hallam	Frederick Sykes	Conservative
Sheffield, Hillsborough	A. V. Alexander	Labour Co-op
Sheffield, Park	Henry Stephenson	National Liberal
Shipley	Sir Norman Rae	National Liberal
Shoreditch	Ernest Griffith Price	National Liberal
Shrewsbury	Viscount Sandon	Conservative
Skipton	Richard Roundell	Conservative
Smethwick	John Davison	Labour
Southampton (Two members)	Edwin Perkins	Conservative
Southampton (Two members)	Lord Apsley	Conservative
Southend-on-Sea	Viscount Elveden	Conservative
South Molton	George Lambert	Liberal
Southport	Godfrey White	Conservative
South Shields	Edward Harney	Liberal
Southwark Central	James Daniel Gilbert	National Liberal
Southwark North	Edward Strauss	National Liberal
Southwark South East	Maurice Alexander	National Liberal
Sowerby	William Simpson-Hinchliffe	Conservative
Spelthorne	Philip Pilditch	Conservative
Spennymoor	Joseph Batey	Labour
Spen Valley	Sir John Simon	Liberal
Stafford	Hon. William Ormsby-Gore	Conservative
Stalybridge and Hyde	John Rhodes	Conservative
Stepney Limehouse	Clement Attlee	Labour
Stepney Mile End	Sir Walter Preston	Conservative
Stirling and Falkirk Burghs	Hugh Murnin	Labour
Stirlingshire East and Clackmannan	MacNeill Weir	Labour
Stirlingshire West	Thomas Johnston	Labour
Stockport (Two members)	William Greenwood	Conservative
Stockport (Two members)	Henry Fildes	National Liberal
Stockton on Tees	Bertrand Watson	National Liberal
Stoke Newington	George Jones	Conservative
Stoke-on-Trent Stoke	John Ward	National Liberal
Stone	Joseph Lamb	Conservative
Stourbridge	Douglas Pielou	Conservative
Streatham	Sir William Lane-Mitchell	Conservative
Stretford	Thomas Robinson	National Liberal
Stroud	Stanley Tubbs	Conservative
Sudbury	Herbert Mercer	Conservative
Sunderland (Two members)	Luke Thompson	Conservative
Sunderland (Two members)	Sir Walter Raine	Conservative
Surrey East	James Galbraith	Conservative
Swansea East	David Williams	Labour
Swansea West	Sir Alfred Mond, Bt	National Liberal
Swindon	Sir Reginald Banks	Conservative
== T ==
Tamworth	Sir Percy Newson, Bt	Conservative
Taunton	John Hope Simpson	Liberal
Tavistock	Maxwell Thornton	Liberal
Thirsk and Malton	Edmund Turton	Conservative
Thornbury	Herbert Charles Woodcock	Conservative
Tiverton	Herbert Sparkes	Conservative
Tonbridge	Herbert Spender-Clay	Conservative
Torquay	Charles Burn	Conservative
Totnes	Samuel Harvey	Conservative
Tottenham North	Robert Morrison	Labour Co-op
Tottenham South	Patrick Malone	Conservative
Twickenham	Sir William Joynson-Hicks, Bt	Conservative
Tynemouth	Sir Alexander Russell	Conservative
== U ==
University of Wales	Thomas Arthur Lewis	National Liberal
Uxbridge	Dennistoun Burney	Conservative
== W ==
Wakefield	Geoffrey Ellis	Conservative
Wallasey	Robert Burton-Chadwick	Conservative
Wallsend	Sir Patrick Hastings	Labour
Walsall	Pat Collins	Liberal
Walthamstow East	Sir Stanley Johnson	Conservative
Walthamstow West	Valentine McEntee	Labour
Wandsworth Central	Sir John Norton-Griffiths, Bt	Conservative
Wansbeck	George Warne	Labour
Warrington	Alec Cunningham-Reid	Conservative
Warwick and Leamington	Ernest Pollock	Conservative
Waterloo	Albert Buckley	Conservative
Watford	Dennis Herbert	Conservative
Wednesbury	Alfred Short	Labour
Wellingborough	Geoffrey Shakespeare	National Liberal
Wells	Robert Bruford	Conservative
Wentworth	George Harry Hirst	Labour
West Bromwich	Frederick Roberts	Labour
Westbury	Charles Darbishire	Liberal
Western Isles	William Cotts	National Liberal
West Ham Plaistow	Will Thorne	Labour
West Ham Silvertown	Jack Jones	Labour
West Ham Stratford	Thomas Groves	Labour
West Ham Upton	David Margesson	Conservative
Westhoughton	Rhys Davies	Labour
Westminster Abbey	John Sanctuary Nicholson	Conservative
Westminster St George's	James Erskine	Independent Conservative
Westmorland	John Weston	Conservative
Weston-super-Mare	John Erskine	Conservative
Whitechapel	Charles Mathew	Labour
Whitehaven	Thomas Gavan-Duffy	Labour
Widnes	Christopher Clayton	Conservative
Wigan	John Parkinson	Labour
Willesden East	Sir Harry Mallaby-Deeley, Bt	Conservative
Willesden West	George Furness	Conservative
Wimbledon	Sir Joseph Hood, Bt	Conservative
Winchester	George Hennessy	Conservative
Windsor	Sir Annesley Somerville	Conservative
Wirral	Gershom Stewart	Conservative
Wolverhampton Bilston	Charles Howard-Bury	Conservative
Wolverhampton East	George Thorne	Liberal
Wolverhampton West	Robert Bird	Conservative
Woodbridge	Sir Arthur Churchman, Bt	Conservative
Wood Green	Godfrey Locker-Lampson	Conservative
Woolwich East	Harry Snell	Labour
Woolwich West	Sir Kingsley Wood	Conservative
Worcester	Richard Robert Fairbairn	Liberal
Workington	Thomas Cape	Labour
The Wrekin	Howard Button	Conservative
Wrexham	Robert Richards	Labour
Wycombe	William Baring du Pré	Conservative
== Y ==
Yeovil	Hon. Aubrey Herbert	Conservative
York	John Butcher	Conservative

== By elections ==
See the list of United Kingdom by-elections.

== Lists ==
- List of MPs for constituencies in Wales (1922–1923)

== See also ==
- UK general election, 1922
- List of parliaments of the United Kingdom
