= Stockport by-election =

Stockport by-election may refer to one of several parliamentary by-elections held for the British House of Commons constituency of Stockport in Cheshire, including:

- 1920 Stockport by-election
- 1925 Stockport by-election

== See also ==
- Stockport (UK Parliament constituency)
