= Charles Royle =

Charles Royle may refer to:

- Charles Royle (Stockport politician) (1872–1963), British Liberal MP for Stockport
- Charles Royle, Baron Royle (1896–1975), his son, British Labour MP for Salford West, life peer
