= Alan Dower =

- In office 1931–1935

Member of Parliament for Stockport

Member of Parliament for Penrith and Cockermouth
- In office 1935–1950

Personal details
- Born: Alan Vincent Gandar Dower; 28 March 1898
- Died: 6 May 1980 (aged 82)
- Party: Conservative
- Spouse(s): Marjorie Rosamond Seton (m. 1922 - 1927), Aymée Lavender Clerk (m. 1928)
- Children: 2
- Relatives: Siblings Leonard Francis, Ronald Willie, Eric Leslie, Harold and Kenneth Cecil
- Occupation: Politician, army officer

Colonel Alan Vincent Gandar Dower (28 March 1898 – 6 May 1980) was a British Army officer and politician. He was Conservative Member of Parliament (MP) for Stockport from 1931 to 1935, and MP for Penrith and Cockermouth from 1935 to 1950.

Dower's brother Eric was also a Conservative MP who established Aberdeen Airport and Aberdeen Airways, while another brother Kenneth was a well-known sportsman, author and explorer. All used different versions of their surname: Dower, Gandar Dower and Gandar-Dower respectively.

Dower was twice married with a daughter from each marriage. He first married Marjorie Rosamond Seton Mulliner (m. 1922 - 1927) who later married Sir George Gordon Medlicott Vereker, and then Aymée Lavender Clerk (m. 1928), who later created a very popular range of scale model horses marketed as Julip Horses.

Parliament of the United Kingdom
Preceded by Arnold Townend; Samuel Hammersley	Member of Parliament for Stockport; 1931 – 1935; With: Samuel Hammersley	Succeeded by Sir Arnold Gridley; Norman Hulbert
Preceded by Arthur Dixey	Member of Parliament for Penrith and Cockermouth; 1935 – 1950	Constituency abolished
