= John R. Bell (trade unionist) =

British trade union leader and political activist

John Robert Bell (1862 – 25 August 1924) was a British trade unionist and political activist.

Born in County Durham, Bell grew up in South Shields. He became a sailor at an early age, and travelled widely. He lived in the United States for many years, where he worked as an official with the International Seamen's Union. In 1894, he travelled to England on behalf of the union, to report on the Labour Electoral Association and the Independent Labour Party. While in England, he struck up a friendship with Havelock Wilson, leader of the National Sailors' and Firemen's Union (NSFU), and Wilson and Bell went on an organising tour of the UK.

In 1910, Bell settled in Kingston upon Hull, where he became the NSFU's Humber District Secretary. He was adopted as an NSFU candidate for Kingston upon Hull West in 1912, but was not endorsed by the Labour Party. He also became active on the Hull Trades and Labour Council, but left during World War I in protest at the Labour Party's policy on the war.

By the time an election was held, in 1918, Hull's constituencies had been redrawn, and Bell stood in Kingston upon Hull South West. He received the support of the NSFU and various other unions, and also of some shipowners. Despite some later reports, he was not accredited by the National Democratic and Labour Party, but he did receive a Coalition coupon, and is therefore often counted as a Coalition Labour candidate. He took 30.9% of the votes cast and second place in the poll.

In his spare time, Bell was active in the Royal Antediluvian Order of Buffaloes, and he served as Grand A. Buffalo of England.

Bell was a prominent figure at Trades Union Congress meetings. He remained a district secretary for the NSFU until his death in 1924.
