= Beresford Melville =

Beresford Valentine Melville, OBE, JP (1857–1931) was a British Conservative Party politician who served as Member of Parliament for Stockport from 1895 to 1906.

Born in Shelsley, Worcestershire, the son of the Rev. D. Melville, Canon and Sub-Dean of Worcester, Beresford Melville was educated at Marlborough College and Brasenose College, Oxford.

He was elected in 1895, re-elected in 1900, but stood down in 1906. He was appointed OBE in 1919.

== Sources ==
- Leigh Rayment's Historical List of MPs^{[usurped]}
- Craig, F.W.S. British Parliamentary Results 1885-1918
- Whitaker's Almanack, 1896 to 1906 editions
