= George Wardle =

British politician

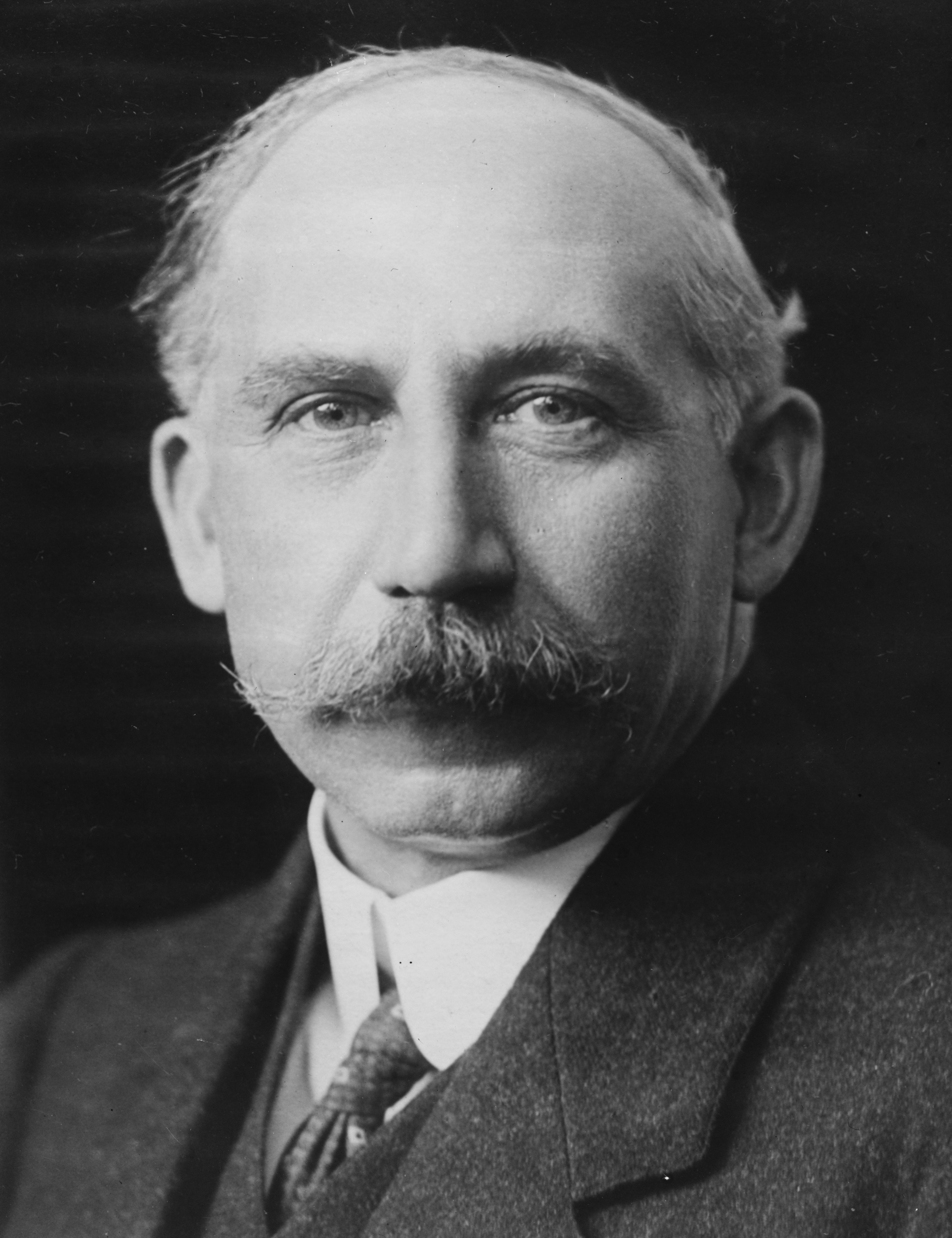
George Wardle

George James Wardle CH (15 May 1865 – 18 June 1947) was a British politician.

== Biography ==
He was born on 15 May 1865.

He was editor of the Railway Review and, in 1906, was elected a Labour Member of Parliament for Stockport. At the 1916 Labour Party conference, he made a speech which resulted in the conference passing resolutions as to the party stand on World War I, something the party leader Ramsay MacDonald had failed to establish. He was a founding member of the Order of the Companions of Honour in 1917, and between 1917 and 1919 he served as Parliamentary Secretary to the Board of Trade. In the 1918 General Election he successfully stood for election as a Coalition Labour candidate. He resigned as a Member of Parliament on 9 March 1920 by becoming Steward of the Chiltern Hundreds.

He died on 18 June 1947.

Parliament of the United Kingdom
Preceded by Joseph Leigh; Beresford Valentine Melville	Member of Parliament for Stockport; 1906–1920; With: James Duckworth 1906–1910; Spencer Leigh Hughes 1910–1920	Succeeded by William Greenwood; Henry Fildes
Party political offices
Preceded by William Crawford Anderson	Chair of the Labour Party; 1916–1917	Succeeded by W. F. Purdy
Political offices
Preceded by George Henry Roberts	Parliamentary Secretary to the Board of Trade; 1917–1919	Succeeded by William Bridgeman
