= 1925 Stockport by-election =

UK parliamentary by-election

The 1925 Stockport by-election was a by-election held for the British House of Commons constituency of Stockport in Cheshire on 17 September 1925. The by-election was won by the Labour Party candidate Arnold Townend.

== Vacancy ==
The Conservative MP William Greenwood had died on 19 August 1925, aged 50. He had held the seat since his election as a Coalition Conservative at a by-election in 1920.

== Candidates ==
The Liberal Party candidate was 55-year-old Henry Fildes, who had also been elected at the 1920 by-election as one of the constituency's two MPs, but lost his seat at the 1923 general election. He had not contested the 1924 general election.

The Labour Party candidate was 45-year-old Arnold Townend, who had been unsuccessful in Manchester Blackley at the 1918 and 1922 general elections.

The Conservative candidate was T. Eastham.

== Result ==
On a high turnout, the vote split three ways, and Townend won the seat for Labour with only 36.5% of the votes. He was re-elected at the 1929 general election, but heavily defeated at the 1931 general election when Labour split over Ramsay MacDonald's formation of a National Government.

Henry Fildes

Stockport by-election, 1925
Party	Candidate	Votes	%	±%
Labour	Arnold Townend	20,219	36.5	+11.7
Conservative	T. Eastham	17,892	32.3	−29.0
Liberal	Henry Fildes	17,296	31.2	+17.3
Majority		2,327	4.2	N/A
Turnout		55,407	85.7	−0.2
Labour gain from Conservative		Swing		

== Previous election ==
General election 1924: Stockport
Party	Candidate	Votes	%	±%
Conservative	William Greenwood	28,057	31.6	+9.2
Conservative	Samuel Hammersley	26,417	29.7	+9.7
Labour	Arnold Townend	21,986	24.8	+6.8
Liberal	Charles Royle	12,386	13.9	−7.3
Majority		4,431	4.9	N/A
Turnout		88,846	85.9	+14.2
Conservative hold		Swing		
Conservative gain from Liberal		Swing		

== See also ==
- Stockport (UK Parliament constituency)
- Stockport
- 1920 Stockport by-election
- List of United Kingdom by-elections (1918–1931)
