= 1938 Willesden East by-election =

UK Parliamentary by-election

The 1938 Willesden East by-election was held on 28 July 1938. The by-election was held due to the death of the incumbent Conservative MP, Daniel Somerville. It was won by the Conservative candidate Samuel Hammersley.

== Previous result ==
General election 1935: Willesden East
Party	Candidate	Votes	%	±%
Conservative	Daniel Somerville	25,613	57.7	−4.4
Labour	Maurice Orbach	15,523	35.0	+13.6
Liberal	Nancy Stuart Parnell	3,217	7.3	−9.2
Majority		10,090	22.7	−18.0
Turnout		44,353	62.0	−6.3
Conservative hold		Swing	-9.0	

== Result ==
Willesden East by-election, 1938
Party	Candidate	Votes	%	±%
Conservative	Samuel Hammersley	16,009	56.6	−1.1
Labour	Maurice Orbach	12,278	43.4	+8.4
Majority		3,731	13.2	−9.5
Turnout		28,287	39.3	−22.7
Conservative hold		Swing	-4.7	
