= Charles Royle (Liberal politician) =

English butcher and politician

- Born: 17 January 1872
- Died: 3 November 1963 (aged 91)
- Occupation: British politician

Charles Royle (17 January 1872 – 3 November 1963) was an English butcher and Liberal politician.

== Family and education ==
Charles Royle was the son of Samuel and Mary Royle. He was educated at Portwood Wesleyan Higher Grade School. He married Maria, the daughter of Oliver Wolfe and they had four sons and two daughters. One of his sons was Charles Royle, who was Labour MP for West Salford

== Career ==
After leaving school, Royle went straight to work in the meat trade, eventually qualifying as a master butcher. He gained the respect and confidence of his peers in the trade and became President of the National Federation of Meat Traders Associations, a position he held twice in 1929 and 1942.

== Politics ==
=== Local politics ===
Royle had a long career in local government. He was a member of Stockport Town Council for 44 years in all, rising to be an Alderman and Mayor of the town four times. In 1947 he was made a freeman of the Borough of Stockport.

=== Parliament ===
Royle first stood for election to the House of Commons at the 1923 general election in Stockport. Stockport was a two-member seat. The two members since the by-election of 1920 (caused by the death of one MP and the resignation of the other, both sitting for the Lloyd George Coalition government) had been the Conservative William Greenwood and the National Liberal Henry Fildes. At the 1923 general election Royle joined Fildes as the Liberal team to fight the two seats. This time Fildes was fighting as a Liberal without prefix or suffix. In the event, Greenwood retained his seat for the Conservatives whilst Royle leapfrogged over Fildes to take the second seat for the Liberals.

At the 1924 general election Royle was unable to hold his seat. He shared the fight against two Conservatives with the Labour candidate Arnold Townend but the Conservatives won both seats.

What the arrangement was between Royle and Fildes is uncertain but when Greenwood died on 19 August 1925, causing a by-election in Stockport, it was Fildes rather than Royle who was adopted to fight the seat for the Liberals. Townend fought again for Labour winning the contest and holding the seat until the 1931 general election.

Royle fought Stockport again, as a pair with Fildes, at the 1929 general election, although this time he was described on the ticket as an Independent Liberal. Royle came bottom of the poll and lost his deposit.

== Publication ==
In 1949, Royle published his autobiography, Opened Doors. It was published by the Meat Trades’ Journal Co, London.

== Death ==
Royle died on 3 November 1963 aged 91.

Parliament of the United Kingdom
Preceded by William Greenwood; Henry Fildes	Member of Parliament for Stockport; 1923–1924; With: William Greenwood	Succeeded by William Greenwood; Samuel Hammersley
