= Martin Sharp (historian) =

English historian (1843–1910)

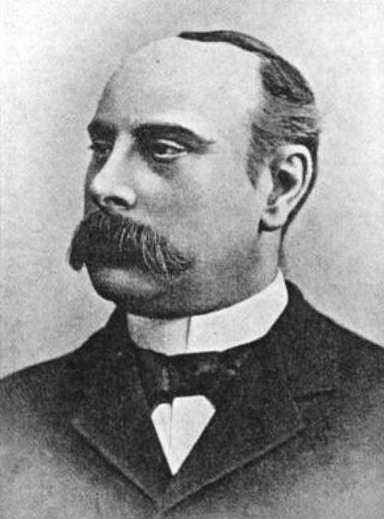
Martin Sharp, c.1907

Martin Andrew Sharp Hume (8 December 1843 – 1 July 1910), born Martin Andrew Sharp, was an English historian, long a resident in Spain.

== Background and early life ==
Martin Andrew Sharp was born in London on 8 December 1843. He was second son of William Lacy Sharp, of the East India Company's service, who married Louisa Charlotte Hume in 1840. He was educated at a private school at Forest Gate, he had some practical training in business, and began early to learn Spanish. A branch of his mother's family had settled at Madrid towards the end of the eighteenth century.

== Career ==
In 1860, Sharp paid his Spanish kinsfolk a first visit, which had a decisive influence on his career. His relatives received him with affectionate cordiality. Though he declined their invitation to make his home with them, he visited them annually for long periods, perfected his knowledge of Spanish, witnessed the revolution of 1868, and became acquainted with the chief organisers of the movement. The last of the Spanish Humes, a lady advanced in years, died in 1876, bequeathing her property to Martin Sharp, and in August 1877, in compliance with her wish, he assumed the name of Hume. He was now independent. A keen volunteer officer, he was attached to the Turkish forces during the Russo-Turkish War of 1877–78; he then spent some time in exploration on the west coast of Africa, and travelled extensively in Central and South America.

Until 1882 Hume's sympathies had been vaguely conservative. His views then changed, and during the next eleven years he actively engaged in English political conflict. He stood unsuccessfully as a liberal candidate at Maidstone in 1885, at Central Hackney in 1886, and at Stockport in 1892 and 1893.

After some practice in journalism, he meanwhile produced his first book, a Chronicle of King Henry VIII of England (1889), a translation from the Spanish. Though this attracted little attention, Hume persevered, and The Courtships of Queen Elizabeth; a History of the Various Negotiations for her Marriage, and The Year after the Armada, and other Historical Studies, both issued in 1896, were received with a degree of popular favour which led him to adopt authorship as a profession. In 1897, he published Sir Walter Ralegh and Philip II of Spain, the latter monograph showing insight and independence of view.

Next year Hume succeeded Pascual de Gayangos at the Public Record Office as editor of the Spanish State Papers, and did sound work in this capacity. However, his official duties did not absorb all his energies. In 1898, he published The Great Lord Burghley, a readable study, and Spain, its Greatness and Decay, 1479–1789, a useful historical outline, which he completed in the following year by the publication of Modern Spain, 1788–1898 (1899; new edit. 1906).

He was appointed Commander of the Order of Isabella the Catholic by King Alfonso XIII in 1902.

Hume never married. He died on 1 July 1910, at his sister's house at Forest Gate.

== Works ==
His principal works were:

- The Year After the Armada: And Other Historical Studies (1896)
- The Courtships of Queen Elizabeth (1896; revised edition, 1904)
- Philip II of Spain (1897)
- Sir Walter Ralegh: the British dominion of the West (1897)
- The Great Lord Burghley (1898)
- Spain: Its Greatness and Decay, 1479–1789 (1898; revised by Armstrong, 1913)
- Modern Spain, 1788–1898 (1899; new edition, 1906)
- The Spanish People (1901)
- The Love Affairs of Mary Queen of Scots (1903)
- Spanish Influence on English Literature (1905)
- Queens of Old Spain (1907)
- The Court of Philip IV: Spain in Decadence (1907)
- Through Portugal (1907)
- Two English Queens and Philip (1908)
- Queen Elizabeth and her England (1910)
- True Stories of the Past (1910, published posthumously)
