= Arnold Townend =

British politician (1880–1968)

Arnold Ernest Townend (1880 – 18 December 1968) was Labour MP for Stockport, a two-member constituency, from 1925 to 1931, initially elected at a by-election.

Born in Salford, Townend became a railway clerk in 1896. He was a supporter of the Labour Party, and stood unsuccessfully in Manchester Blackley in 1918. He was also unsuccessful in Stockport in 1923 and 1924, but won a by-election in 1925, and held the seat in 1929. He lost his seat at the 1931 United Kingdom general election, and was also unsuccessful at Carlisle in 1935.

Towend later relocated to Southport, where he served as mayor from 1955 to 1956.

Parliament of the United Kingdom
Preceded by Samuel Hammersley; William Greenwood	Member of Parliament for Stockport; 1925–1931; With: Samuel Hammersley	Succeeded by Samuel Hammersley; Alan Dower
