= Joseph Leigh =

British politician

Sir Joseph Leigh (1841 – 22 September 1908) was a British Liberal Party politician and cotton spinner.

== Background ==
He was the eldest son of Thomas Leigh, cotton spinner at Meadow Mill in Stockport. He was educated at Stockport Grammar School. He married in 1868, Alice Ann Adamson. They had four sons and two daughters. He was knighted in 1894. He was also made a Chevalier of the Legion of Honour, in France.

== Civic career ==
He was a member, latterly an Alderman of the Borough of Stockport Council for 29 years. He served as the borough's Mayor from 1885 to 1889. He also served as a justice of the peace for Cheshire and Stockport. He was made an Honourable Freeman of the Borough of Stockport. He was chairman and promoter of Stockport Technical School. He was a Director of the Manchester Ship Canal.

== Political career ==
At parliamentary elections he contested, as a Liberal party candidate, the dual member seat of Stockport in 1885, 1886, 1892, 1895 and 1900. He sat as Liberal MP for Stockport from 1892 to 1895 and from 1900 to 1906.

General election 1900 Stockport Electorate 12,386
Party	Candidate	Votes	%	±%
Liberal	Sir Joseph Leigh	5,666	26.5	+1.8
Conservative	Beresford Valentine Melville	5,377	25.2	−0.2
Liberal	G Green	5,200	24.4	+1.6
Conservative	Dr A P Hillier	5,098	23.9	−3.2
Turnout			87.6	−3.8
Majority		568	2.6	
Majority		177	0.8	
Conservative hold		Swing		
Liberal gain from Conservative		Swing		

He stood down at the general election of January 1906. He did not stand for parliament again.

Parliament of the United Kingdom
Preceded by Sydney Gedge	Member of Parliament for Stockport; 1892 – January 1895; With: Louis John Jennings then George Whiteley	Succeeded by Beresford Valentine Melville
Preceded by George Whiteley	Member of Parliament for Stockport; 1900 – January 1906; With: Beresford Valentine Melville	Succeeded by James Duckworth
