= Samuel Hammersley =

Samuel Schofield Hammersley (22 December 1892 – 28 March 1965) was an industrialist and Conservative Party politician.

Hammersley was educated at Hulme Grammar School, Oldham, and King's College, Cambridge, where he took a second class in part I of the natural sciences tripos in 1914. The following year, during World War I, he joined the East Lancashire Regiment and was wounded at Gallipoli, before transferring to France as a Captain with the Tank Corps from its inception.

In 1922 he joined his father on the board of his cotton mills. Throughout his life he fought for jobs and for the future for the cotton industry. He wrote a book in 1925 entitled Industrial Leadership. He thought that the average British man worked for the satisfaction of working as much as for the money. He was convinced that manufacturing was the backbone of national prosperity. During World War II, he worked with the Ministry of Supply for tank production. He built up S. Noton Ltd. into the world's largest maker of luggage and handbags and was listed in the Directory of Directors 1946 as the Managing Director of twelve companies.

He was elected at the 1924 general election as a Member of Parliament (MP) for Stockport, a two-seat constituency. He held the seat until he stepped down at the 1935 election. He returned to the House of Commons three years later as MP for Willesden East, after winning a by-election in July 1938. He represented Willesden until his defeat at the 1945 election.

Hammersley was founding Chairman of the Anglo-Israel Association in 1948.

In 1919 he married Kate Wakley, with whom he had five daughters.

Parliament of the United Kingdom
Preceded by William Greenwood; Charles Royle	Member of Parliament for Stockport; 1924 – 1935; With: William Greenwood to 1925; Arnold Townend 1925–1931; Alan Dower from 1931	Succeeded by Sir Arnold Gridley; Norman Hulbert
Preceded by Daniel Somerville	Member of Parliament for Willesden East; 1938 – 1945	Succeeded by Maurice Orbach
