= Daniel Somerville =

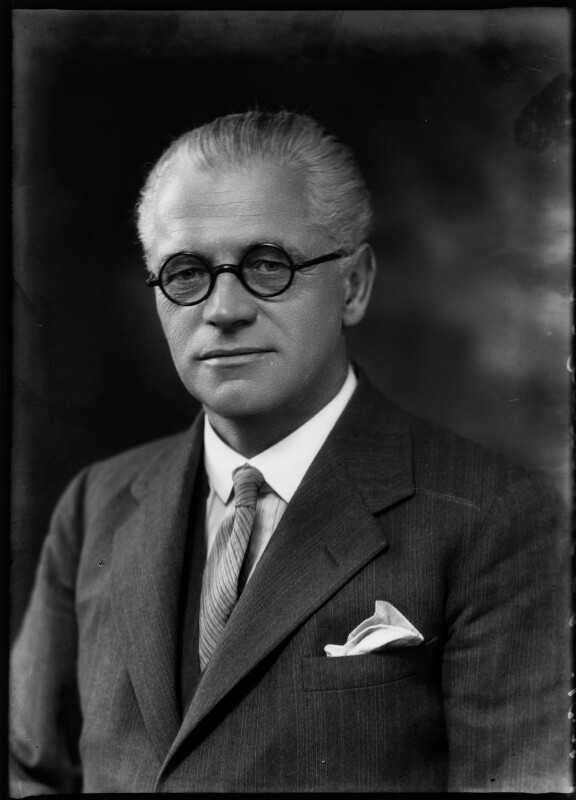
Somerville in 1931

Daniel Gerald Somerville (26 October 1879 – 1 July 1938) was a Conservative Party politician in the United Kingdom.

He was elected at the 1922 general election as member of parliament (MP) for Barrow-in-Furness. He was re-elected in 1923, but was narrowly defeated at the 1924 election in a straight contest with the Labour Party candidate John Bromley.

He returned to the House of Commons at the 1929 general election as MP for the north-west London constituency of Willesden East. He held that seat until his death in 1938, aged 58. Somerville died on the same day as his predecessor as MP for Willesden East, George Frederick Stanley.

Parliament of the United Kingdom
Preceded by Robert Chadwick	Member of Parliament for Barrow-in-Furness; 1922 – 1924	Succeeded by John Bromley
Preceded by George Stanley	Member of Parliament for Willesden East; 1929 – 1938	Succeeded by Samuel Hammersley
