= James Kershaw =

British cotton mill owner (1795–1864)

- Born: Manchester, England
- Died: Manor House, Streatham
- Resting place: West Norwood Cemetery, London
- Monuments: Grade II listed, West Norwood, by Alfred Waterhouse
- Known for: Member of the Anti-Corn Law League and founder of the Borough of Manchester, 1838
- Political party: Liberal

James Kershaw (1795–1864) was a British cotton mill owner and Liberal MP, associated with the Anti-Corn Law League.

He rose from being a clerk for the cotton-spinning company of Lees, Millington & Cullender, of Manchester, to a partner and then head of Kershaw, Lees & Sidebottom, mill owners of Manchester.

He was instrumental in obtaining the municipal franchise of Manchester as a borough in 1838, and was its Mayor between 1842 and 1843, and later became the MP for Stockport from 1847 until his death.

Elected to membership of the Manchester Literary and Philosophical Society on 24 January 1854

He died at his home in Streatham, and was buried in West Norwood Cemetery where his ornate Gothic tomb by Alfred Waterhouse (architect of the Natural History Museum, London and Manchester Town Hall) is listed Grade II, and in such poor condition as to be on the English Heritage at risk register. There is currently no plan from Lambeth council to improve the situation.

== Sources ==
- Obituary, The Times 28 April 1864
