= 1920 Stockport by-election =

UK parliamentary by-election

- 27 March 1920 (Polling); 10 April 1920 (Declaration)
- Turnout: 75.7%

Candidate	William Greenwood	Henry Fildes	Leo Chiozza Money
Party	Unionist	National Liberal	Labour
Alliance	Coalition	Coalition
Popular vote	22,847	22,386	16,042
Percentage	25.7%	25.1%	18.0%
		Ind	Ind
Candidate	Samuel Perry	Albert Kindell	John Terrett
Party	Labour	Independent	Independent
Alliance		Ind. Parliamentary Group	Ind. Parliamentary Group
Popular vote	14,434	5,644	5,543
Percentage	16.2%	6.3%	6.1%
MP before election
Spencer Hughes (Coalition Liberal)
George Wardle (Coalition Labour)
Subsequent MP
William Greenwood (Unionist)
Henry Fildes (Coalition Liberal)

The 1920 Stockport by-election was a parliamentary by-election held on 27 March 1920 for the UK constituency of Stockport, in Cheshire.

Hughes

It followed the death of Spencer Leigh Hughes and resignation of George Wardle, the two Members of Parliament (MPs) for Stockport. With the departure of both MPs, a single by-election was held for both seats. Always a rare occurrence in Britain, Stockport was the first such by-election since the 1899 Oldham by-election; it proved to be the last such by-election, as multi-member constituencies were abolished in 1950.

== Background ==
At the 1918 general election, the Lloyd George Coalition Government had won a large majority. The coalition included most of the Conservative and Liberal parties. Both Stockport MPs had been Coalition candidates, Hughes being a Liberal, but Wardle unusually being a Labour Party supporter of the Coalition. With this unusual level of cross-party agreement, they had not faced any opposition.

By 1920, the prospect of a merger of the Conservative and Liberal parties was being seriously considered. The local Conservative group considered that had it run candidates in 1918, it would have won both seats. As a result, when Hughes died, they considered it their turn to nominate a candidate for the constituency. Meanwhile, the Liberal group was determined to run a candidate to replace Hughes. David Lloyd George and Bonar Law, national Liberal and Conservative leaders, had been considering merging their organisations to form a single party, and considered that it would be a disaster to have Conservative and Liberal candidates facing each other. In order to keep their local organisations happy, they convinced Wardle to resign, enabling both to stand a candidate.

== Candidates ==
The Liberals chose Henry Fildes, and the Conservatives, William Greenwood.

The majority of the Labour Party were opposed to the Coalition, and determined to stand candidates outside it in an attempt to gain Wardle's seat. After some discussion, they decided to stand economist and former Liberal MP Leo Chiozza Money and to support the candidature of the national organiser of the Co-operative Party, Samuel Perry.

Horatio Bottomley, a prominent right-wing independent politician also assembled a slate of two candidates on an "Anti-Waste" platform, foreshadowing the Anti-Waste League he formed the following year.

The Irish War of Independence had begun in 1919. While the Labour Party had a policy in favour of Irish self-determination, many Irish people considered that it had done little to act on it. A leading Irish trade unionist and secretary of the Irish Labour Party, William O'Brien, was interned by Britain for his role in the conflict, and he decided to stand in the by-election as a platform for his cause, and in an attempt to embarrass the British Labour Party into action. On the ballot, he insisted that he was described as the "Irish Republican Workers Party" candidate, even though no such organisation existed.

== Campaign ==
In Parliament, Joseph Kenworthy called for O'Brien's release to contest the by-election, a call supported by Labour candidate Money, citing the example of John Maclean. Home Secretary Edward Shortt rejected this option.

With a total of seven candidates, the Stockport by-election set a new record, not equalled until the 1962 South Dorset by-election and not beaten until the 1976 Walsall North by-election.

== Result ==
Greenwood and Fildes achieved a clear victory, their similar tally of votes suggesting that most coalition supporters had indeed voted for both candidates. Money's profile enabled him to take third place, some six thousand votes behind, with Perry further back. The difference in their votes was around 1,500, much of this being explained by the 1,000 voters who had supported Money and O'Brien – very few opting for O'Brien and any other candidate. The Anti-Waste candidates attracted little support, but both were able to beat O'Brien.

Labour were disappointed not to take a seat, particularly as O'Brien's intervention had not taken enough votes to explain their defeat. Perhaps in part as a result of the by-election, they moved their position to more actively support the Irish labour movement.

Stockport by-election, 1920
Party		Candidate	Votes	%	±%
C	Unionist	William Greenwood	22,847	25.6	New
C	National Liberal	Henry Fildes	22,386	25.1	N/A
	Labour	Leo Chiozza Money	16,042	18.0	N/A
	Labour Co-op	Samuel Perry	14,434	16.2	New
	Independent	Albert Kindell	5,644	6.3	New
	Independent	John Terrett	5,543	6.2	New
	Ind. Republican	William O'Brien	2,336	2.6	New
Majority			6,805	7.7	N/A
Majority			6,344	7.1	N/A
Turnout			89,132	75.7	N/A
	Unionist gain from Coalition Labour		Swing	N/A	
	National Liberal hold		Swing	N/A	
C indicates candidate endorsed by the coalition government.

== Aftermath ==
Greenwood and Fildes both held their seats at the 1922 general election, while O'Brien was elected as TD for Dublin South the same year. Perry was eventually elected as MP for Kettering at the 1923 general election.

== See also ==
- Stockport constituency
- Stockport
- 1925 Stockport by-election
- List of United Kingdom by-elections (1918–1931)
