= Coalition Labour =

Coalition Labour was a description used by candidates in the 1918 United Kingdom general election who identified with trade unionism and supported the outgoing coalition government, which retained power at the election. The Labour Party had left the coalition earlier in 1918; most Coalition Labour candidates were former Labour Members of Parliament (MPs).

When Labour withdrew from the coalition, four of its MPs preferred to remain as ministers: G. N. Barnes, James Parker, George Henry Roberts and George Wardle. They, along with the National Sailors' and Firemen's Union-sponsored candidate John R. Bell, contested the election independently of the Labour Party, and were termed "Coalition Labour" candidates. Only Bell and Parker received a Coalition Coupon, and they were wrongly identified in official coalition literature as Coalition National Democratic and Labour Party and Coalition Liberal candidates, respectively. The National Democratic and Labour Party was a separate organisation which also supported the Coalition and had a background in the British Workers League.

Of the five candidates in the 1918 general election, the four former ministers were successful:

Constituency	Candidate	Votes	Percentage	Position	Sponsor
Cannock	James Parker	8,068	51.8	1	?
Glasgow Gorbals	George Nicoll Barnes	14,347	65.9	1	?
Kingston upon Hull South West	John R. Bell	5,005	30.9	2	Sailors
Norwich	George Henry Roberts	26,642	45.1	1	None
Stockport	George James Wardle	Unopposed	N/A	1	None

Following the election, the four ministers continued in position. Stephen Walsh, who had been elected as a Labour Party candidate, also agreed to join the coalition government. However, he was sponsored by the Lancashire and Cheshire Miners' Federation, which voted against his participation, and he therefore left the government a few days later.

Of the remaining four Coalition Labour MPs, Wardle resigned in 1920 due to poor health, and Barnes retired at the 1922 United Kingdom general election. Parker and Roberts stood in that election; as the coalition had ended, they were termed a National Liberal and an independent candidate respectively, (Note: However, F. W. S. Craig records Parker as standing as an independent in the election, despite the recognition as supporting the National Liberals.) and only Roberts won his seat. He stood again at the 1923 United Kingdom general election, as a Conservative Party candidate, but was then defeated.

== See also ==
- List of Labour Party breakaway parties (UK)
