= William Greenwood (politician) =

William Greenwood (1875 – 19 August 1925) was Conservative MP for Stockport from 1920 to 1925. He was first elected in the 1920 Stockport by-election, and was re-elected in the General Elections of 1922, 1923 and 1924. He died in office, causing the 1925 Stockport by-election.

In 1920, he made a significant contribution to the purchase price of "The Towers" in Didsbury, Manchester, to be used as the research centre for the British Cotton Industry Research Association, and asked that the building be named after his daughter, so the facility became known as the Shirley Institute.

Parliament of the United Kingdom
Preceded by Spencer Leigh Hughes; George Wardle	Member of Parliament for Stockport; 1920–1925; With: Henry Fildes 1920–23; Charles Royle 1923–24; Samuel Hammersley from 1924	Succeeded by Samuel Hammersley; Arnold Townend
