= Stockport (constituency) =

UK Parliament constituency (since 1983)

- Borough constituency for the House of Commons
- Interactive map of boundaries since 2024
- Location within North West England
- County: Greater Manchester
- Electorate: 74,769 (March 2020)
- Major settlements: Stockport, Brinnington, Four Heatons

Current constituency
- Created: 1983
- Member of Parliament: Nav Mishra (Labour)
- Seats: One
- Created from: Stockport North, Stockport South

1832–1950
- Seats: Two
- Replaced by: Stockport North, Stockport South

Stockport is a constituency (Note: A borough constituency (for the purposes of election expenses and type of returning officer)) represented in the House of Commons of the UK Parliament since 2019 by Navendu Mishra of the Labour Party. (Note: As with all constituencies, the constituency elects one Member of Parliament (MP) by the first past the post system of election at least every five years.)

== Constituency profile ==
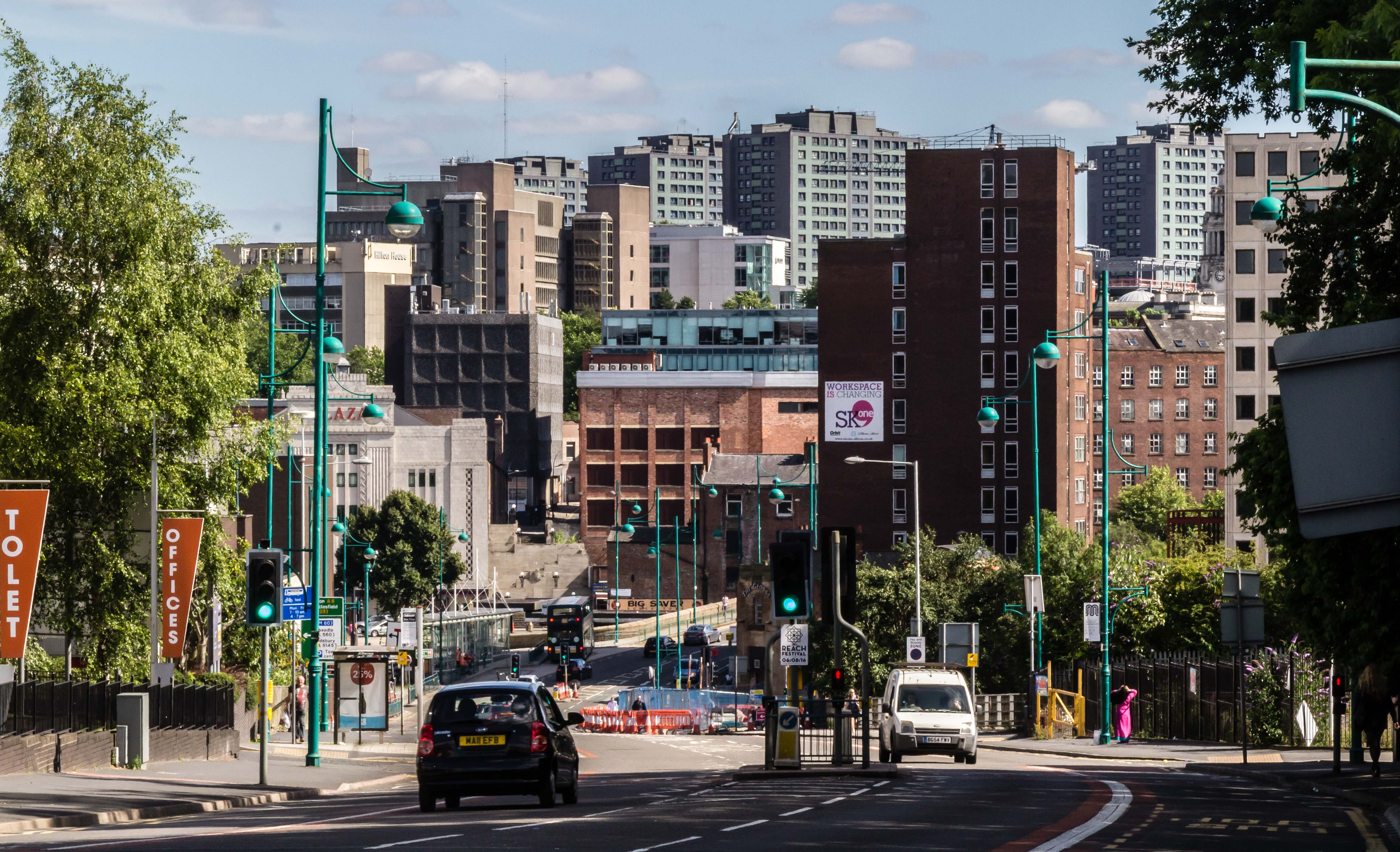
Stockport

Stockport is a constituency in Greater Manchester in North West England. It covers most of Stockport, including the town centre and the areas of Adswood, Edgeley, the Four Heatons, Portwood, Brinnington and Reddish.

Stockport is a large town located around 6 miles (9.7 km) south-east of the centre of Manchester. It grew rapidly during the industrial era and was absorbed into Manchester's wider urban area by suburban sprawl. Like much of the region, Stockport was a centre for textile manufacturing, especially the production of silk, cotton and hats. This constituency contains a variety of neighbourhood types. The town centre is highly-deprived with most residents living in dense flats or terraces. Brinnington is a low-income council estate built in the 1960s where most residents live in socially-rented accommodation. The Four Heatons, meanwhile, are affluent and suburban in character. House prices across the constituency are generally higher than the rest of North West England but lower than the UK average.

Stockport has low proportions of students and retirees and a large population of middle-aged adults with families. Residents have average levels of income, homeownership and education but above-average rates of child poverty. A high proportion of residents work in the retail and business administration sectors, and the percentage claiming unemployment benefits is in line with the UK-wide rate. White people made up 85% of the population at the 2021 census. Asians, mostly of Pakistani origin, were the largest ethnic minority group at 8% of residents.

At the local borough council, most of this constituency is represented by the Labour Party, with some Green Party councillors elected in Reddish and a Reform UK representative elected in Brinnington. An estimated 51% of voters in Stockport supported remaining in the European Union in the 2016 referendum, marginally higher than the UK-wide figure of 48%.

== History ==
Stockport was created as a two-member parliamentary borough by the Reform Act 1832. Under the Representation of the People Act 1918, the constituency was retained as one of only 12 two-member non-university seats, with the boundaries being brought into line with those of the county borough, which had expanded through absorbing the urban districts of Reddish and Heaton Norris (formerly part of the Stretford constituency), and into neighbouring parishes in the abolished constituency of Hyde.

Under the Representation of the People Act 1948, all 2-member seats were abolished and Stockport was split into the single member seats of Stockport North and Stockport South.

Following the formation of the metropolitan borough of Stockport under the Local Government Act 1972, the single Stockport seat, electing one MP, was recreated for the 1983 general election, encompassing central and southern parts of the ex-county borough, with northern parts, including Reddish, forming part of the new Denton and Reddish seat.

== Boundaries ==
=== Historic ===
1918-1950: The County Borough of Stockport.

Map of boundaries 2010-2024

1983–1997: The Metropolitan Borough of Stockport wards of Cale Green, Davenport, Edgeley, Heaton Mersey, Heaton Moor, and Manor.

1997–2010: The Metropolitan Borough of Stockport wards of Brinnington, Cale Green, Davenport, Edgeley, Heaton Mersey, Heaton Moor, and Manor.

Brinnington ward transferred from Denton and Reddish.

2010–2024: The Metropolitan Borough of Stockport wards of Brinnington and Central, Davenport and Cale Green, Edgeley and Cheadle Heath, Heatons North, Heatons South, and Manor.

Boundaries adjusted to take account of revision of local authority wards.

=== Current ===
Further to the 2023 review of Westminster constituencies which became effective for the 2024 general election, the constituency was defined as comprising the following wards of the Metropolitan Borough of Stockport as they existed on 1 December 2020:

- Brinnington and Central; Davenport and Cale Green; Edgeley and Cheadle Heath; Heatons North; Heatons South; Reddish North; Reddish South.

To bring the electorate within the permitted range, the two Reddish wards were transferred from the abolished constituency of Denton and Reddish, partly offset by the transfer of Manor ward to Hazel Grove.

Following a local government boundary review which came into effect in May 2023, the constituency now comprises the following wards of the Metropolitan Borough of Stockport from the 2024 general election:

- Brinnington & Stockport Central; Cheadle East & Cheadle Hulme North (part); Davenport & Cale Green (most); Edgeley; Heatons North; Heatons South; Reddish North; Reddish South.

== Members of Parliament ==
=== Prominent members ===
Edward William Watkin was a railway entrepreneur, who helped to fund and plan lines across Britain, in Canada and, to a lesser extent, in the United States.

George Whiteley became later in his tenure for Stockport Chief Whip between 1905 and 1908 in the Liberal administrations of Sir Henry Campbell-Bannerman and H. H. Asquith.

In the 21st century, Ann Coffey served as a Parliamentary private secretary under the Blair government. During Jeremy Corbyn's leadership of the Labour Party she defected from Labour to the short-lived Change UK.

=== MPs 1832–1950 ===
Election	1st Member	1st Party	2nd Member	2nd Party
1832	Thomas Marsland	Tory	John Horatio Lloyd	Radical
1834	Thomas Marsland	Conservative	John Horatio Lloyd	Radical
1835	Thomas Marsland	Conservative	Henry Marsland	Radical
1841	Richard Cobden	Radical	Henry Marsland	Radical
July 1847	Richard Cobden	Radical	James Heald	Conservative
December 1847	James Kershaw	Radical	James Heald	Conservative
1852	James Kershaw	Radical	John Benjamin Smith	Radical
1859	James Kershaw	Liberal	John Benjamin Smith	Liberal
May 1864	Edward Watkin	Liberal	John Benjamin Smith	Liberal
1868	William Tipping	Conservative	John Benjamin Smith	Liberal
1874	Charles Henry Hopwood	Liberal	Frederick Pennington	Liberal
1885	Louis John Jennings	Conservative	William Tipping	Conservative
1886	Louis John Jennings	Conservative	Sydney Gedge	Conservative
1892	Louis John Jennings	Conservative	Sir Joseph Leigh	Liberal
February 1893	George Whiteley	Conservative	Sir Joseph Leigh	Liberal
1895	George Whiteley	Conservative	Beresford Melville	Conservative
1900	George Whiteley	Liberal	Beresford Melville	Conservative
1900	Sir Joseph Leigh	Liberal	Beresford Melville	Conservative
1906	James Duckworth	Liberal	George Wardle	Labour
January 1910	Spencer Leigh Hughes	Liberal	George Wardle	Labour
1918	Spencer Leigh Hughes	Coalition Liberal	George Wardle	Coalition Labour
1920	William Greenwood	Coalition Conservative	Henry Fildes	Coalition Liberal
1922	William Greenwood	Conservative	Henry Fildes	National Liberal
1923	William Greenwood	Conservative	Charles Royle	Liberal
1924	William Greenwood	Conservative	Samuel Hammersley	Conservative
1925	Arnold Townend	Labour	Samuel Hammersley	Conservative
1931	Alan Dower	Conservative	Samuel Hammersley	Conservative
1935	Sir Arnold Gridley	Conservative	Norman Hulbert	Conservative
1950	Constituency abolished			

=== MPs 1983–present ===
- Constituency recreated (1983)

Election	Member	Party
1983	Anthony Favell	Conservative
1992	Ann Coffey	Labour
February 2019	Ann Coffey	The Independent Group for Change
2019	Navendu Mishra	Labour

== Elections ==
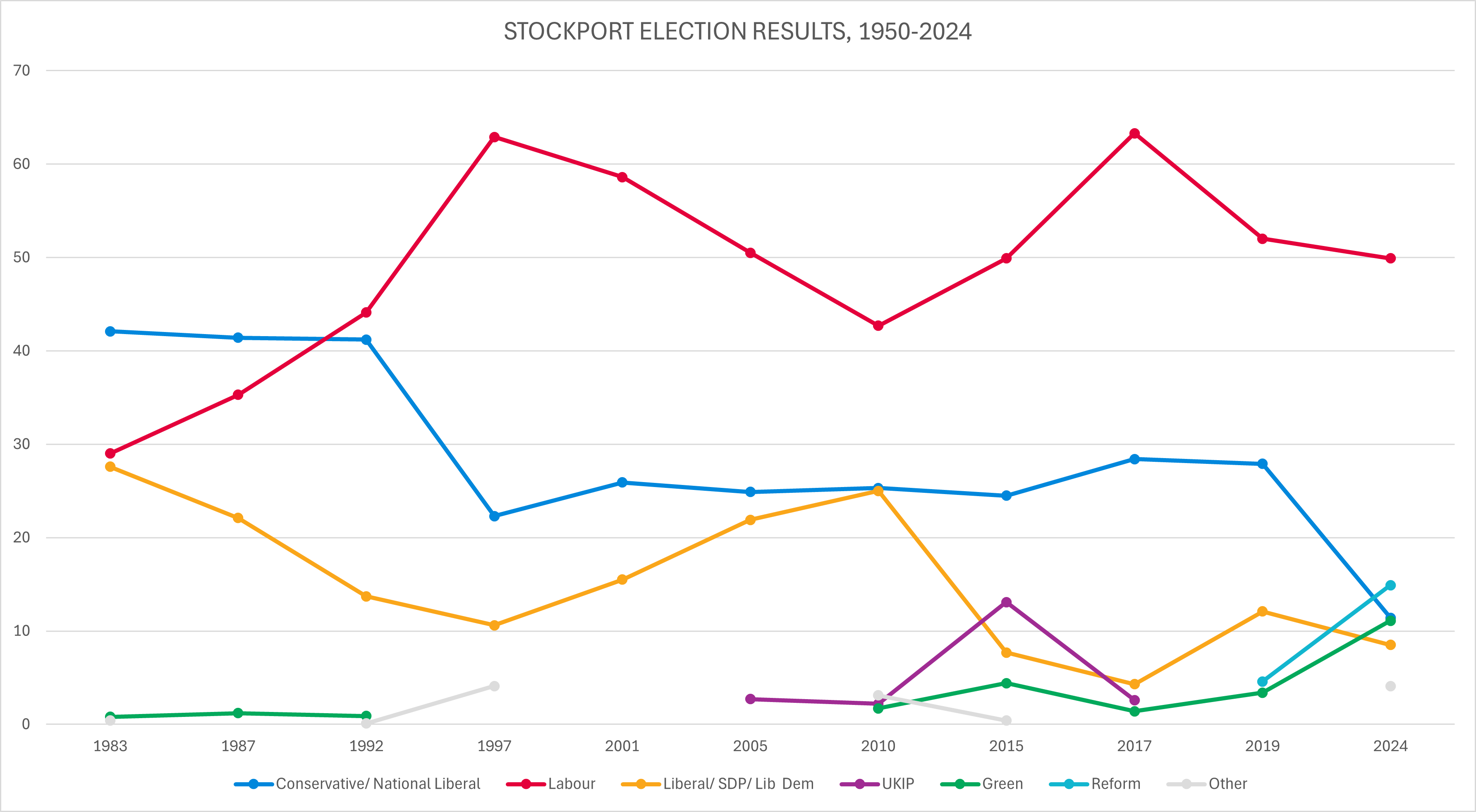
Election results 1950-2024

=== Elections in the 2020s ===
General election 2024: Stockport
Party	Candidate	Votes	%	±%
Labour	Navendu Mishra	21,787	49.9	−4.4
Reform	Lynn Schofield	6,517	14.9	+9.6
Conservative	Oliver Johnstone	4,967	11.4	−16.8
Green	Helena Mellish	4,865	11.1	+7.5
Liberal Democrats	Wendy Meikle	3,724	8.5	−0.2
Workers Party	Ayesha Khan	1,630	3.7	N/A
Stockport Fights Austerity No To Cuts	Ashley Walker	193	0.4	N/A
Rejected ballots		185		
Majority		15,270	35.0	+8.9
Turnout		43,683	57.0	–4.5
Registered electors		76,625		
Labour hold		Swing	–7.0	

Changes are from the notional 2019 results on the 2024 boundaries.

=== Elections in the 2010s ===
2019 notional result
Party	Vote	%
Labour	24,980	54.3
Conservative	12,968	28.2
Liberal Democrats	3,986	8.7
Brexit Party	2,448	5.3
Green	1,635	3.6
Turnout	46,017	61.5
Electorate	74,769	

General election 2019: Stockport
Party	Candidate	Votes	%	±%
Labour	Navendu Mishra	21,695	52.0	–11.3
Conservative	Isy Imarni	11,656	27.9	–0.5
Liberal Democrats	Wendy Meikle	5,043	12.1	+7.8
Brexit Party	Lee Montague-Trenchard	1,918	4.6	N/A
Green	Helena Mellish	1,403	3.4	+2.0
Majority		10,039	24.1	–10.8
Turnout		41,715	64.1	−0.6
Labour hold		Swing	–5.4	

General election 2017: Stockport
Party	Candidate	Votes	%	±%
Labour	Ann Coffey	26,282	63.3	+13.4
Conservative	Daniel Hamilton	11,805	28.4	+3.9
Liberal Democrats	Daniel Hawthorne	1,778	4.3	–3.4
UKIP	John Kelly	1,088	2.6	–10.5
Green	Gary Lawson	591	1.4	–3.0
Majority		14,477	34.9	+9.5
Turnout		41,544	64.7	+2.7
Labour hold		Swing	+4.8	

Ann Coffey left Labour in February 2019 and joined Change UK.

General election 2015: Stockport
Party	Candidate	Votes	%	±%
Labour	Ann Coffey	19,771	49.9	+7.2
Conservative	Daniel Hamilton	9,710	24.5	–0.8
UKIP	Steven Woolfe	5,206	13.1	+10.9
Liberal Democrats	Daniel Hawthorne	3,034	7.7	–17.3
Green	Gary Lawson	1,753	4.4	+2.7
Left Unity	John Pearson	175	0.4	N/A
Majority		10,061	25.4	+8.0
Turnout		39,649	62.0	+0.4
Labour hold		Swing	+4.0	

General election 2010: Stockport
Party	Candidate	Votes	%	±%
Labour	Ann Coffey	16,697	42.7	–9.6
Conservative	Stephen Holland	9,913	25.3	+1.8
Liberal Democrats	Stuart Bodsworth	9,778	25.0	+3.6
BNP	Duncan Warner	1,201	3.1	N/A
UKIP	Michael N. Kelly	862	2.2	–0.5
Green	Peter Barber	677	1.7	N/A
Majority		6,784	17.4	–11.3
Turnout		39,128	61.6	+7.6
Labour hold		Swing	–5.7	

=== Elections in the 2000s ===
General election 2005: Stockport
Party	Candidate	Votes	%	±%
Labour	Ann Coffey	18,069	50.5	−8.1
Conservative	Elizabeth Berridge	8,906	24.9	−1.0
Liberal Democrats	Lyn-Su Floodgate	7,832	21.9	+6.4
UKIP	Richard Simpson	964	2.7	N/A
Majority		9,163	25.6	−7.1
Turnout		35,771	54.5	+1.2
Labour hold		Swing	−3.5	

General election 2001: Stockport
Party	Candidate	Votes	%	±%
Labour	Ann Coffey	20,731	58.6	−4.3
Conservative	John Allen	9,162	25.9	+3.6
Liberal Democrats	Mark Hunter	5,490	15.5	+4.9
Majority		11,569	32.7	−7.9
Turnout		35,383	53.3	−18.2
Labour hold		Swing		

=== Elections in the 1990s ===
General election 1997: Stockport
Party	Candidate	Votes	%	±%
Labour	Ann Coffey	29,338	62.9	
Conservative	Stephen Fitzsimmons	10,426	22.3	
Liberal Democrats	Sylvia Roberts	4,951	10.6	
Referendum	William Morley-Scott	1,280	2.7	N/A
Socialist Labour	Geoff Southern	255	0.5	N/A
Monster Raving Loony	Colin Newitt	213	0.5	N/A
Go Bowling Party	Christopher Dronsfield	206	0.4	N/A
Majority		18,912	40.6	
Turnout		46,669	71.3	
Labour hold		Swing		

General election 1992: Stockport
Party	Candidate	Votes	%	±%
Labour	Ann Coffey	21,096	44.1	+8.8
Conservative	Anthony Favell	19,674	41.2	−0.2
Liberal Democrats	Anne C. Corris	6,539	13.7	−8.4
Green	Judith A. Filmore	436	0.9	−0.3
Natural Law	David N. Saunders	50	0.1	N/A
Majority		1,422	3.1	N/A
Turnout		47,795	82.3	+4.2
Labour gain from Conservative		Swing	+4.5	

=== Elections in the 1980s ===
General election 1987: Stockport
Party	Candidate	Votes	%	±%
Conservative	Anthony Favell	19,410	41.4	−0.7
Labour	Shirley Haines	16,557	35.3	+6.3
SDP	John Begg	10,365	22.1	−5.5
Green	Michael Shipley	573	1.2	+0.4
Majority		2,853	6.1	−7.0
Turnout		46,332	78.1	+3.5
Conservative hold		Swing	−3.5	

General election 1983: Stockport
Party	Candidate	Votes	%	±%
Conservative	Anthony Favell	18,517	42.1	
Labour	Peter R. Ward	12,731	29.0	
SDP	Tom McNally	12,129	27.6	
Ecology	Michael Shipley	369	0.8	
Nationalist Party	Kenneth S. Walker	194	0.4	
Majority		5,786	13.1	
Turnout		43,940	74.6	
Conservative win (new seat)				

=== Elections in the 1940s ===
General election 1945: Stockport (2 member seat)
Party	Candidate	Votes	%	±%
Conservative	Arnold Gridley	31,039	20.6	−10.1
Conservative	Norman Hulbert	30,792	20.4	−9.6
Labour	Reginald Stamp	29,674	19.6	−0.5
Labour	Roland Casasola	29,630	19.6	+0.4
Liberal	Hugh Sutherland	14,994	9.9	N/A
Liberal	Frederick William Malbon	14,942	9.9	N/A
Majority		1,118	0.8	−9.1
Turnout		150,239	77.2	−2.3
Conservative hold		Swing		
Conservative hold		Swing		

=== Elections in the 1930s ===
General election 1935: Stockport (2 member seat)
Party	Candidate	Votes	%	±%
Conservative	Arnold Gridley	43,882	30.7	− 6.3
Conservative	Norman Hulbert	43,001	30.0	−4.7
Labour	James Hudson	28,798	20.1	+3.1
Labour	Christopher Thomas Douthwaite	27,528	19.2	N/A
Majority		14,203	9.9	−7.8
Turnout		143,209	79.5	−4.6
Conservative hold		Swing		
Conservative hold		Swing		

General election 1931: Stockport (2 member seat)
Party	Candidate	Votes	%	±%
Conservative	Samuel Hammersley	50,936	37.0	+11.3
Conservative	Alan Dower	47,757	34.7	+15.2
Labour	Arnold Townend	23,350	17.0	−10.4
Ind. Labour Party	Tom Abbott	15,591	11.3	N/A
Majority		24,407	17.7	+12.0
Turnout		137,634	84.1	− 0.5
Conservative gain from Labour		Swing		
Conservative hold		Swing		

=== Elections in the 1920s ===
General election 1929: Stockport (2 member seat)
Party	Candidate	Votes	%	±%
Labour	Arnold Townend	30,955	27.4	+2.6
Unionist	Samuel Hammersley	29,043	25.7	−4.0
Liberal	Henry Fildes	22,595	20.0	+6.1
Unionist	Edwin Noel Lingen-Barker	22,047	19.5	+12.1
Independent Liberal	Charles Royle	8,355	7.4	−6.5
Majority		8,908	7.9	N/A
Turnout		112,995	84.6	−1.1
Labour gain from Unionist		Swing		
Unionist hold		Swing		

1925 Stockport by-election
Party	Candidate	Votes	%	±%
Labour	Arnold Townend	20,219	36.5	+11.7
Unionist	Thomas Eastham	17,892	32.3	−29.0
Liberal	Henry Fildes	17,296	31.2	+17.3
Majority		2,327	4.2	N/A
Turnout		55,407	85.7	−0.2
Labour gain from Unionist		Swing		

General election 1924: Stockport (2 member seat)
Party	Candidate	Votes	%	±%
Unionist	William Greenwood	28,057	31.6	+9.2
Unionist	Samuel Hammersley	26,417	29.7	+9.7
Labour	Arnold Townend	21,986	24.8	+6.8
Liberal	Charles Royle	12,386	13.9	−7.3
Majority		4,431	15.8	N/A
Turnout		88,846	85.9	+14.2
Unionist hold		Swing		
Unionist gain from Liberal		Swing		

General election 1923: Stockport (2 seats)
Party	Candidate	Votes	%	±%
Unionist	William Greenwood	20,308	22.4	−10.7
Liberal	Charles Royle	19,223	21.2	N/A
Unionist	Samuel Hammersley	18,129	20.0	N/A
Liberal	Henry Fildes	16,756	18.4	−16.0
Labour	Arnold Townend	16,340	18.0	+2.2
Majority		3,552	4.0	−12.4
Majority		1,094	1.2	−16.5
Turnout		90,756	71.7	−11.7
Unionist hold		Swing		
Liberal hold		Swing		

Henry Fildes

General election 1922: Stockport (2 member seat)
Party	Candidate	Votes	%	±%
National Liberal	Henry Fildes	35,241	34.4	+9.3
Unionist	William Greenwood	33,852	33.1	+7.4
Labour Co-op	Samuel Perry	17,059	16.7	+0.5
Labour	James C.H. Robinson	16,126	15.8	−2.2
Majority		18,182	17.7	N/A
Majority		16,793	16.4	+8.7
Turnout		102,278	83.4	+7.7
National Liberal gain from Liberal		Swing		
Unionist hold		Swing		

1920 Stockport by-election (2 member seat)
Party	Candidate	Votes	%	±%
Unionist	William Greenwood	22,847	25.7	N/A
National Liberal	Henry Fildes	22,386	25.1	N/A
Labour	Leo Chiozza Money	16,042	18.0	N/A
Co-operative Party	Samuel Perry	14,434	16.2	N/A
Independent	Albert Alfred George Kindell	5,644	6.3	N/A
Independent	John Joseph Terrett	5,443	6.1	N/A
Ind. Republican	William O'Brien	2,336	2.6	N/A
Majority		6,805	7.7	N/A
Majority		6,344	7.1	N/A
Turnout		89,132	75.7	N/A
Unionist gain from Coalition Labour		Swing	N/A	
National Liberal hold		Swing	N/A	

=== Elections in the 1910s ===
S.L. Hughes

General election 1918: Stockport (2 member seat)
Party		Candidate	Votes	%	±%
C	Liberal	Spencer Leigh Hughes	Unopposed		
	Coalition Labour	George Wardle	Unopposed		
	Liberal hold				
	Labour hold				
C indicates candidate endorsed by the coalition government.

In 1918 Hughes was endorsed by the Coalition Government. The Coalition had a policy of not publicly endorsing Labour Party candidates but Wardle was a known supporter of the Coalition.

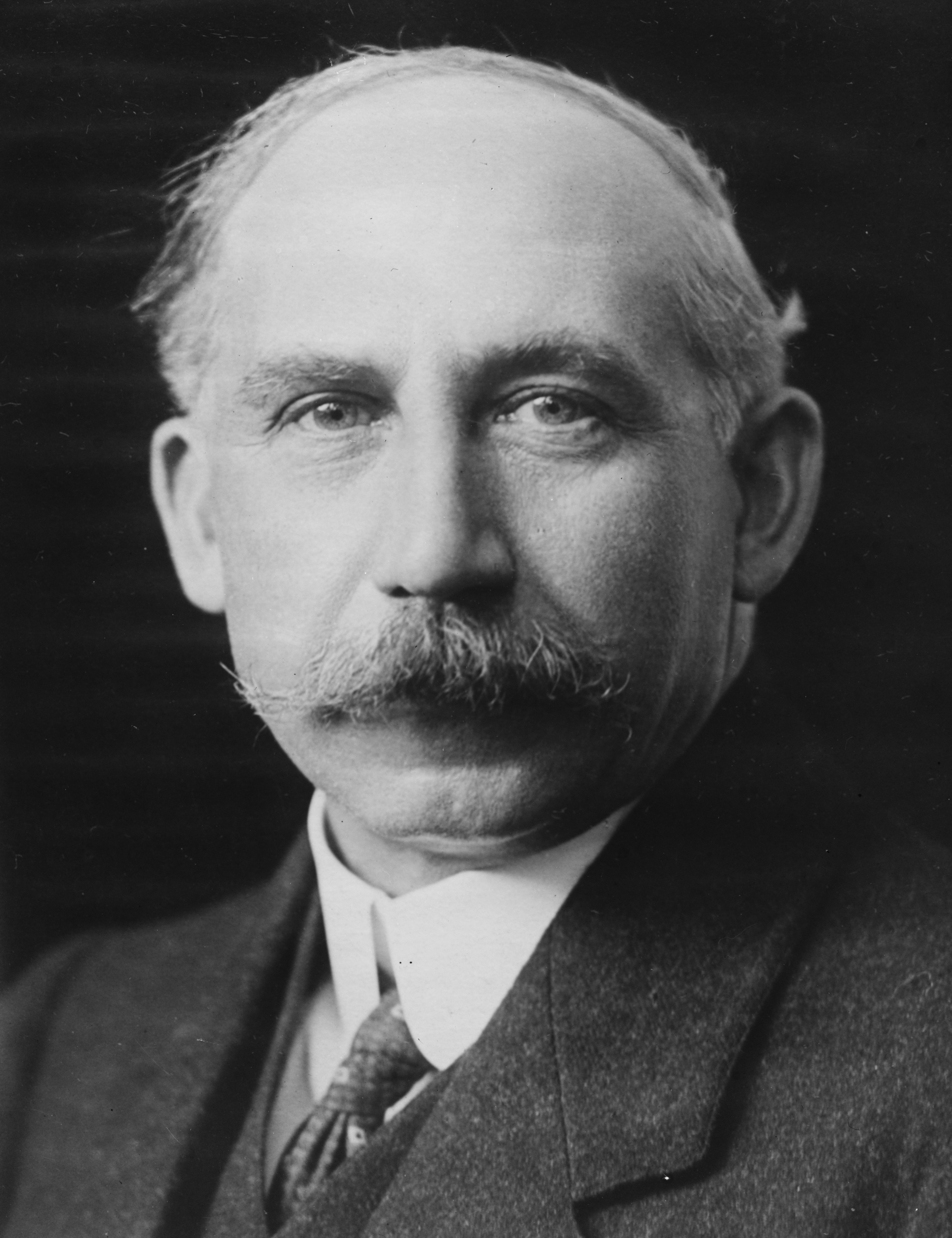
George Wardle

General election December 1910: Stockport
Party	Candidate	Votes	%	±%
Liberal	Spencer Leigh Hughes	6,169	27.1	−0.8
Labour	George Wardle	6,094	26.9	−1.1
Conservative	John Lort-Williams	5,234	23.1	+1.0
Conservative	Robert Campbell	5,183	22.9	+0.9
Turnout		22,680	90.5	−3.7
Registered electors		13,002		
Majority		935	4.0	−1.8
Liberal hold		Swing	−0.9	
Majority		860	3.8	−2.1
Labour hold		Swing	−1.1	

General election January 1910: Stockport
Party	Candidate	Votes	%	±%
Labour	George Wardle	6,682	28.0	−4.4
Liberal	Spencer Leigh Hughes	6,645	27.9	−1.2
Conservative	George Edward Raine	5,268	22.1	+1.7
Conservative	James Stuart Rankin	5,249	22.0	+3.9
Turnout		23,844	94.2	+1.1
Registered electors		13,002		
Majority		1,414	5.9	−6.1
Labour hold		Swing	−3.1	
Majority		1,377	5.8	−2.9
Liberal hold		Swing	−1.5	

=== Elections in the 1900s ===
General election 1906: Stockport
Party	Candidate	Votes	%	±%
Labour Repr. Cmte.	George Wardle	7,299	32.4	N/A
Liberal	James Duckworth	6,544	29.1	+2.6
Conservative	Harry Barnston	4,591	20.4	−4.8
Conservative	Hugh O'Neill	4,064	18.1	−5.8
Turnout		22,498	93.1	+5.5
Registered electors		12,645		
Majority		2,708	12.0	N/A
Labour Repr. Cmte. gain from Conservative		Swing	N/A	
Majority		1,953	8.7	+6.1
Liberal hold		Swing	+3.7	

General election 1900: Stockport
Party	Candidate	Votes	%	±%
Liberal	Joseph Leigh	5,666	26.5	+1.8
Conservative	Beresford Melville	5,377	25.2	−0.2
Liberal	George Green (Scottish businessmn)	5,200	24.4	+1.6
Conservative	Alfred Peter Hillier	5,098	23.9	−3.2
Turnout		21,341	87.6	−3.8
Registered electors		12,386		
Majority		568	2.6	N/A
Liberal gain from Conservative		Swing	+1.0	
Majority		177	0.8	+0.1
Conservative hold		Swing	−0.9	

=== Elections in the 1890s ===
General election 1895: Stockport
Party	Candidate	Votes	%	±%
Conservative	George Whiteley	5,410	27.1	+1.8
Conservative	Beresford Melville	5,067	25.4	+1.7
Liberal	Joseph Leigh	4,933	24.7	−1.6
Liberal	John Henry Roskill	4,562	22.8	−1.9
Turnout		10,115	91.4	−2.4
Registered electors		11,062		
Majority		134	0.7	N/A
Conservative hold		Swing	+1.7	
Conservative gain from Liberal		Swing	+1.8	

By-election, 22 Feb 1893: Stockport
Party	Candidate	Votes	%	±%
Conservative	George Whiteley	5,264	52.3	+3.3
Liberal	Martin Hume	4,799	47.7	−3.3
Majority		465	4.6	+4.0
Registered electors		10,804		
Turnout		10,063	93.1	−0.7
Conservative hold		Swing	+3.3	

- Caused by Jennings' death.

General election 1892: Stockport
Party	Candidate	Votes	%	±%
Liberal	Joseph Leigh	5,202	26.3	+2.1
Conservative	Louis John Jennings	4,986	25.3	−1.8
Liberal	Martin Hume	4,876	24.7	+2.0
Conservative	Patrick Bowes-Lyon	4,681	23.7	−2.3
Turnout		9,925	93.8	+2.7
Registered electors		10,577		
Majority		521	2.6	N/A
Liberal gain from Conservative		Swing	+2.2	
Majority		110	0.6	−1.2
Conservative hold		Swing	−1.9	

=== Elections in the 1880s ===
General election 1886: Stockport
Party	Candidate	Votes	%	±%
Conservative	Louis John Jennings	4,702	27.1	+0.1
Conservative	Sydney Gedge	4,495	26.0	+1.0
Liberal	Joseph Leigh	4,184	24.2	−0.8
Liberal	Horace Davey	3,938	22.7	−0.3
Majority		311	1.8	+1.8
Turnout		8,711	91.1	−3.4
Registered electors		9,560		
Conservative hold		Swing	+0.5	
Conservative hold		Swing	+0.7	

General election 1885: Stockport
Party	Candidate	Votes	%	±%
Conservative	Louis John Jennings	4,855	27.0	+2.6
Conservative	William Tipping	4,498	25.0	+1.8
Liberal	Joseph Leigh	4,486	25.0	−0.8
Liberal	Charles Henry Hopwood	4,132	23.0	−3.6
Majority		753	4.0	N/A
Majority		12	0.0	N/A
Turnout		9,031	94.5	−0.6 (est)
Registered electors		9,560		
Conservative gain from Liberal		Swing	+1.7	
Conservative gain from Liberal		Swing	+2.7	

General election 1880: Stockport
Party	Candidate	Votes	%	±%
Liberal	Charles Henry Hopwood	4,232	26.6	+0.6
Liberal	Frederick Pennington	4,103	25.8	+0.4
Conservative	George Arthur Fernley	3,873	24.4	0.0
Conservative	Henry Bell	3,685	23.2	−1.0
Majority		230	1.4	+0.4
Turnout		7,947 (est)	95.1 (est)	+5.9
Registered electors		8,353		
Liberal hold		Swing	+0.3	
Liberal hold		Swing	+0.7	

=== Elections in the 1870s ===
General election 1874: Stockport
Party	Candidate	Votes	%	±%
Liberal	Charles Henry Hopwood	3,628	26.0	+0.6
Liberal	Frederick Pennington	3,538	25.4	+0.5
Conservative	William Tipping	3,406	24.4	−1.6
Conservative	Percy Mitford	3,372	24.2	+0.5
Majority		132	1.0	N/A
Turnout		6,972 (est)	89.2 (est)	−2.4
Registered electors		7,814		
Liberal hold		Swing	+0.6	
Liberal gain from Conservative		Swing	+0.5	

=== Elections in the 1860s ===
General election 1868: Stockport
Party	Candidate	Votes	%	±%
Conservative	William Tipping	2,714	26.0	+11.0
Liberal	John Benjamin Smith	2,658	25.4	−7.8
Liberal	Edward Watkin	2,598	24.9	−11.9
Conservative	William Ambrose	2,475	23.7	+8.7
Turnout		5,223 (est)	91.6 (est)	−4.9
Registered electors		5,702		
Majority		116	1.1	N/A
Conservative gain from Liberal		Swing	+10.4	
Majority		183	1.7	−1.5
Liberal hold		Swing	−10.4	

General election 1865: Stockport
Party	Candidate	Votes	%	±%
Liberal	Edward Watkin	736	36.8	−1.6
Liberal	John Benjamin Smith	664	33.2	+1.2
Conservative	William Tipping	601	30.0	+0.4
Majority		63	3.2	+0.8
Turnout		1,301 (est)	96.5 (est)	+3.0
Registered electors		1,348		
Liberal hold		Swing	−0.9	
Liberal hold		Swing	+0.5	

By-election, 9 May 1864: Stockport
Party	Candidate	Votes	%	±%
Liberal	Edward Watkin	Unopposed		
Liberal hold				

- Caused by Kershaw's death.

=== Elections in the 1850s ===
General election 1859: Stockport
Party	Candidate	Votes	%	±%
Liberal	James Kershaw	769	38.4	−3.4
Liberal	John Benjamin Smith	641	32.0	+1.7
Conservative	William Gibb	594	29.6	+1.7
Majority		47	2.4	−0.1
Turnout		1,299 (est)	93.5 (est)	+3.4
Registered electors		1,389		
Liberal hold		Swing	−2.1	
Liberal hold		Swing	+0.4	

General election 1857: Stockport
Party	Candidate	Votes	%	±%
Radical	James Kershaw	834	41.8	+3.6
Radical	John Benjamin Smith	606	30.3	−2.5
Conservative	William Gibb	557	27.9	−1.1
Majority		49	2.5	−1.3
Turnout		1,277 (est)	90.1 (est)	−1.1
Registered electors		1,417		
Radical hold		Swing	+2.1	
Radical hold		Swing	−1.0	

General election 1852: Stockport
Party	Candidate	Votes	%	±%
Radical	James Kershaw	725	38.2	+7.8
Radical	John Benjamin Smith	622	32.8	−3.7
Conservative	James Heald	549	29.0	−3.3
Majority		73	3.8	N/A
Turnout		1,223 (est)	91.2 (est)	+11.6
Registered electors		1,341		
Radical hold		Swing	+4.7	
Radical gain from Conservative		Swing	−0.3	

=== Elections in the 1840s ===
By-election, 16 December 1847: Stockport
Party	Candidate	Votes	%	±%
Radical	James Kershaw	545	51.3	+15.6
Conservative	Thomas Marsland	518	48.7	+16.4
Majority		27	2.6	−1.6
Turnout		1,063	88.2	+8.6
Registered electors		1,205		
Radical hold		Swing	−0.4	

- Caused by Cobden declining the seat after also being elected for West Riding of Yorkshire and opting to sit there.

General election 1847: Stockport
Party	Candidate	Votes	%	±%
Radical	Richard Cobden	643	36.5	−0.6
Conservative	James Heald	570	32.3	+8.6
Radical	James Kershaw	537	30.4	−8.8
Chartist	John West	14	0.8	N/A
Turnout		882 (est)	79.6 (est)	+7.8
Registered electors		1,108		
Majority		73	4.2	−9.2
Radical hold		Swing	−2.5	
Majority		33	1.9	N/A
Conservative gain from Radical		Swing	+9.0	

General election 1841: Stockport
Party	Candidate	Votes	%	±%
Radical	Henry Marsland	571	39.2	+4.5
Radical	Richard Cobden	541	37.1	+6.5
Conservative	Thomas Marsland	346	23.7	−11.0
Majority		195	13.4	N/A
Turnout		889	71.8	−1.6
Registered electors		1,238		
Radical hold		Swing	+5.0	
Radical gain from Conservative		Swing	+6.0	

=== Elections in the 1830s ===
General election 1837: Stockport
Party	Candidate	Votes	%	±%
Radical	Henry Marsland	467	34.7	+14.3
Conservative	Thomas Marsland	467	34.7	+0.9
Radical	Richard Cobden	412	30.6	+10.2
Turnout		875	73.4	−21.5
Registered electors		1,192		
Majority		0	0.0	−7.0
Radical hold		Swing	+6.9	
Majority		55	4.1	−4.4
Conservative hold		Swing	−11.8	

General election 1835: Stockport
Party	Candidate	Votes	%	±%
Radical	Henry Marsland	582	40.8	−11.8
Conservative	Thomas Marsland	482	33.8	+0.7
Whig	Edward Davies Davenport	361	25.3	+11.0
Turnout		875	94.9	+0.5
Registered electors		922		
Majority		100	7.0	+6.2
Radical hold		Swing	−8.7	
Majority		121	8.5	+2.1
Conservative hold		Swing	−2.4	

General election 1832: Stockport
Party	Candidate	Votes	%
Tory	Thomas Marsland	551	33.1
Radical	John Horatio Lloyd	444	26.7
Radical	Henry Marsland	431	25.9
Whig	Edward Davies Davenport	237	14.3
Turnout		955	94.4
Registered electors		1,012	
Majority		107	6.4
Tory win (new seat)			
Majority		13	0.8
Radical win (new seat)			

== See also ==
- 1920 Stockport by-election
- 1925 Stockport by-election
- List of parliamentary constituencies in Greater Manchester
- History of parliamentary constituencies and boundaries in Cheshire

== Sources ==
- Craig, F. W. S. (1983) [1969]. British parliamentary election results 1918–1949 (3rd ed.). Chichester: Parliamentary Research Services. ISBN 0-900178-06-X.
- Election results, 1992–2005 (Guardian)
- Election results 1983–1992
- John McHugh, The Stockport by-election of 1920
