= Henry Fildes =

British politician (1870 - 1948)

Henry Fildes

Sir Henry Fildes (12 May 1870 – 12 July 1948) was a Liberal Party, later National Liberal Party and later still, Liberal National Party politician in the United Kingdom. He was a member of parliament (MP) from 1920 to 1923 and from 1935 to 1945.

He was elected as Coalition Liberal Member of Parliament (MP) for Stockport at a by-election in March 1920, following the death of one of the constituency's two MPs and the resignation of the other. He was re-elected in 1922 as a National Liberal (as the Coalition Liberals became following the dissolution of the Coalition), but was defeated at the 1923 general election by the Liberal Party candidate Charles Royle.

He did not contest the 1924 election, and came third in a closely fought 3-way contest at the 1925 by-election. He was unsuccessful again in 1929, and did not stand in 1931.

After the death in July 1935 of Joseph Hunter, the Liberal National MP for Dumfriesshire, Fildes contested the by-election in September, winning the seat with a large majority over his only opponent, the Labour Co-operative candidate. Only a month after the by-election, Parliament was dissolved for the 1935 general election, when Fildes was re-elected by a large majority. He stood down from Parliament at the 1945 general election.

He was knighted in 1932.

== Notes ==
Parliament of the United Kingdom
Preceded by Spencer Hughes and George Wardle	Member of Parliament for Stockport; 1920–1923; With: William Greenwood	Succeeded by William Greenwood and Charles Royle
Preceded by Joseph Hunter	Member of Parliament for Dumfriesshire; 1935–1945	Succeeded by Niall Macpherson
