= Little Storping in the Swuff =

English indie-pop band

Little Storping In The Swuff
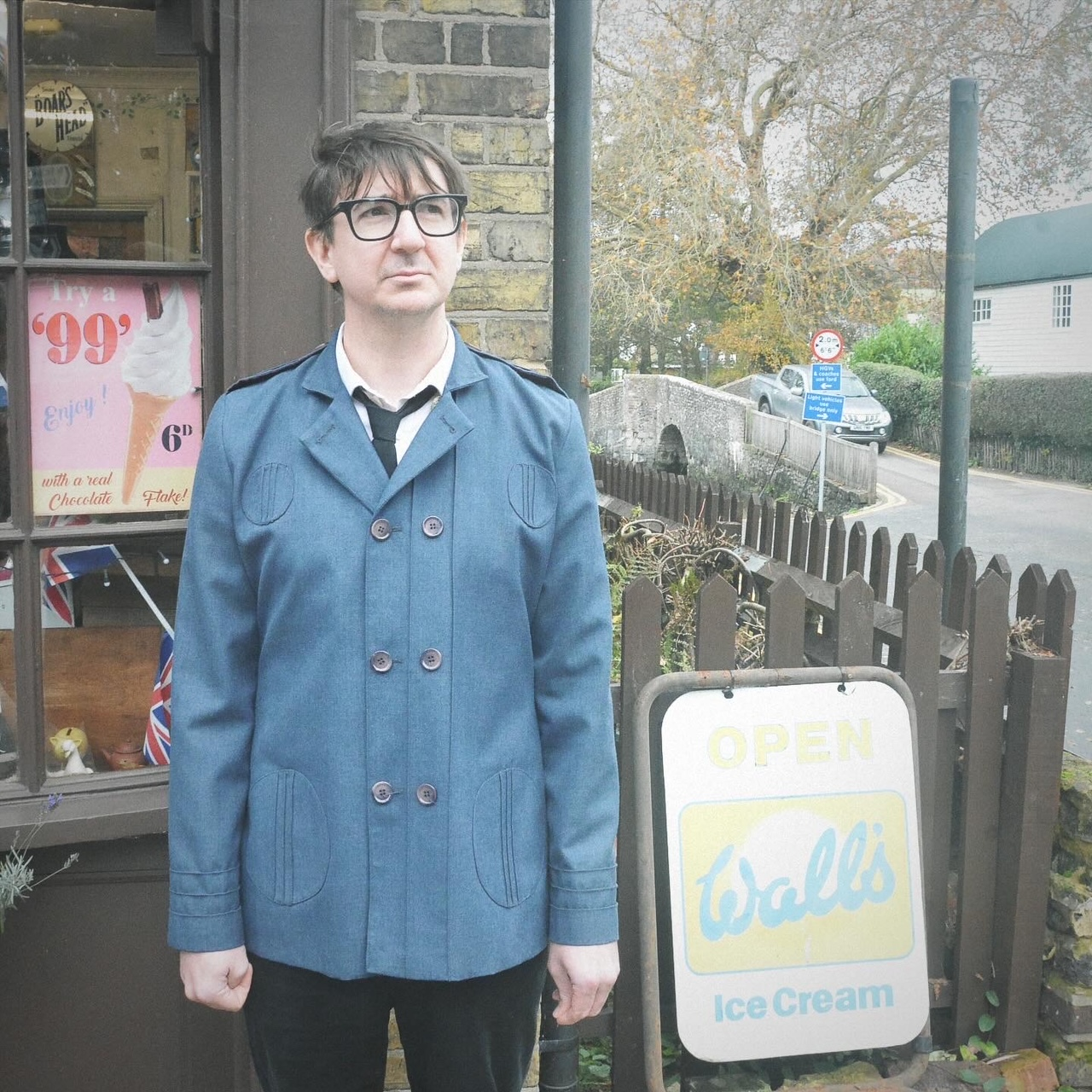
- David Goggin aka Little Storping In The Swuff

Background information
- Origin: Rochester, England
- Genres: Chamber pop, psych, indie pop
- Years active: 2023-present
- Label: Spinout Nuggets

Little Storping In The Swuff are an indie pop band from Rochester, England.

== Formation ==
Named after a fictional town from an episode of the cult 60s British TV spy series The Avengers, Little Storping In The Swuff was unveiled in 2023 as the new musical vehicle for Rochester based songwriter David Goggin.

Prior to Little Storping In The Swuff, David Goggin was the creative force behind Medway pysch-pop outfit Brigadier Ambrose, whose 'quirky guitar pop' was described by Huw Stephens as ‘the greatest thing to ever come out of Chatham’.

Goggin also went on to form the short-lived cinematic London band Vlks, described in The Guardian’s band of the day column as “promisingly miserabilist elegiac melodrama”.

Little Storping In The Swuff is where Goggin’s previous artistic outputs appear to meet.

== Recent activity ==
The debut album Baroque Anxieties was released through the Spinout Nuggets record label in 2024. The record gained much support in the United Kingdom across BBC 6 Music (including a session for Riley & Coe) and supportive words in the press, including The Guardian, Shindig! and Bearded Magazine.

The follow-up album Hassle Olympics will be released in April 2026

== Members ==
- David Goggin – vocals, guitar, keyboards, bass, drums
- Matthew Boorman – piano, organ, keyboards, backing vocals
- Ben Hogwood – cello
- George Bacon – violin
- Tom Morley – trumpet

== Discography ==
=== Albums ===
- Baroque Anxieties (April 2024, Spinout Nuggets)
- Hassle Olympics (April 2026, Spinout Nuggets)
