= Wills Brothers =

English sculptors

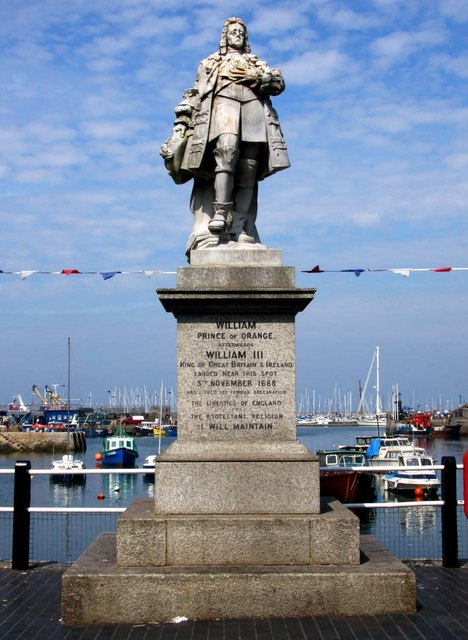
Statue of William III, Brixham, Devon (1899)

The Wills Brothers, also known as W. J. & T. Wills, consisting of William John (born c. 1826 in Islington, London) and Thomas Wills (born c. 1835 in St Pancras, London) were a firm of sculptor brothers who were noted for their sculpture and modelling work between 1857 and 1895.

Annual exhibitors at the Royal Academy until 1884, they were best known for their designs of drinking fountains, and were employed by the Metropolitan Free Drinking Fountain Association and Coalbrookdale Company. They were noted for their cast iron work in particular, made by the Coalbrookdale Company.

In 1859 they were commissioned to design the "People's Fountain" for the Bolton Metropolitan Borough Council, costing £114 in total (of which £80 was for the sculpture) and completed in 1860. The 1.18 m (3 ft 10 in) statue on a 93 cm (37 in) high pedestal was relocated in 1866 to Bolton Park (later renamed Queen's Park). In 1978 the statue was vandalised beyond repair; it was replaced on the pedestal with an inferior statue of a woman pouring water from a jug.

The brothers were also well known for their statues of notable figures. Notable works include a statue of Richard Cobden in Camden (1866–1868), Sir Humphry Davy in Penzance (1872), Lord Mayo in Cockermouth (1875), George Leach Ashworth in Rochdale (1877), Sir Thomas White in Coventry (1883), Henry Edwards in Weymouth (1886) and William III at Brixham, Torbay (1889).
