= Statue of William III, Brixham =

Statue in Devon, England

Statue of William III
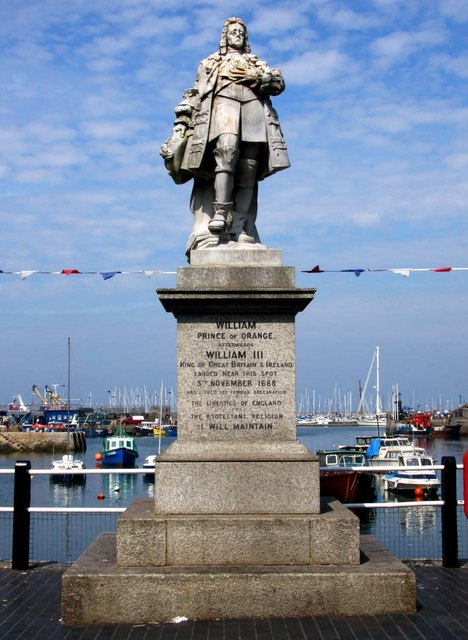
- The south-west face of the statue
- Interactive map of Statue of William III
- Location: The Strand, Lower Brixham
- Coordinates: 50.396073°N 3.512722°W
- Designer: W. and T. Wills of London
- Type: Statue
- Material: White marble and granite
- Beginning date: 1888
- Completion date: 1889
- Dedicated date: 5 November 1889
- Dedicated to: William of Orange

A statue of William III, also known as the Prince of Orange statue, stands in Brixham, Devon, England. It commemorates the landing of William of Orange (later to become King William III of England) and his army at the town on 5 November 1688. The monument has been a Grade II listed building since 1949.

== Description ==
The monument consists of a white marble statue on a granite pedestal and plinth. The statue is a figure of William Prince of Orange. On the south-west face of the pedestal (facing away from the harbour) the incised inscription reads:

WILLIAM/ PRINCE OF ORANGE,/ AFTERWARDS/ WILLIAM III./ KING OF GREAT BRITAIN & IRELAND/ LANDED NEAR THIS SPOT/ 5TH NOVEMBER 1688/ AND ISSUED HIS FAMOUS DECLARATION/ "THE LIBERTIES OF ENGLAND/ AND/ THE PROTESTANT RELIGION/ I WILL MAINTAIN".

On the south-east face the inscription reads:

ERECTED BY PUBLIC SUBSCRIPTION/ AND/ DEDICATED TO THE TOWN OF BRIXHAM./ FOUNDATION STONE LAID 5TH NOVBR 1888,/ BY HIS EXCELLENCY/ COUNT DE BYLANDT./ UNVEILED 5TH NOVEMBER, 1889, BY/ C. A. BENTINCK ESQ. J.P./ THE RIGHT HON LORD CHURSTON/ CHAIRMAN OF COMMITTEE./ CHARLES ATKINS, SECRETARY.

On the north-west face is the inscription:

ENGELANDS VRIJHEID DOOR ORANJE HERSTELD.

The statue was originally surrounded by a set of iron railings, but these no longer exist.
