= Richard Cobden =

British politician (1804–1865)

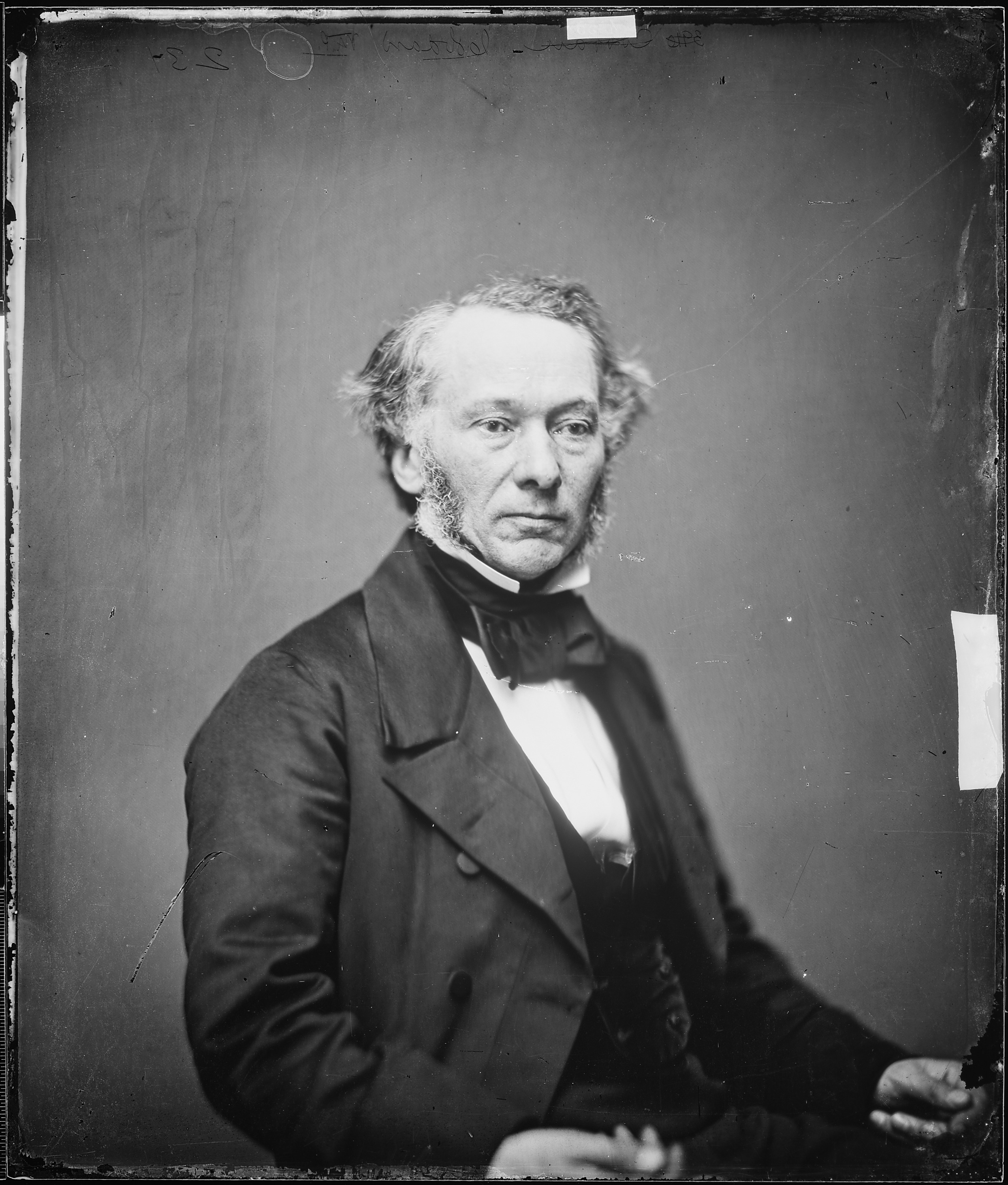
- Cobden c. early 1860s

Parliamentary offices
- 1841–1847: Member of Parliament for Stockport
- 1847–1857: Member of Parliament for West Riding of Yorkshire
- 1859–1865: Member of Parliament for Rochdale

Personal details
- Born: 3 June 1804 Dunford, Heyshott, Sussex, England
- Died: 2 April 1865 (aged 60) Suffolk Street, Westminster, London, England
- Resting place: West Lavington, Sussex
- Party: Liberal; Independent Radical
- Occupation: Politician
- Profession: Manufacturer
- Known for: Campaigner

Richard Cobden (3 June 1804 – 2 April 1865) was a British Radical and Liberal politician, manufacturer, and a campaigner for free trade and peace. He was associated with the Anti–Corn Law League and the Cobden–Chevalier Treaty.

As a young man, Cobden was a successful commercial traveller who became co-owner of a highly profitable calico printing factory in Sabden but lived in Manchester, a city with which he would become strongly identified. However, he soon found himself more engaged in politics, and his travels convinced him of the virtues of free trade (anti-protection) as the key to better international relations.

In 1838, he and John Bright founded the Anti–Corn Law League, aimed at abolishing the unpopular Corn Laws, which protected landowners' interests by levying taxes on imported wheat, thus raising the price of bread. As a Member of Parliament from 1841, he fought against opposition from the Peel ministry, and abolition was achieved in 1846.

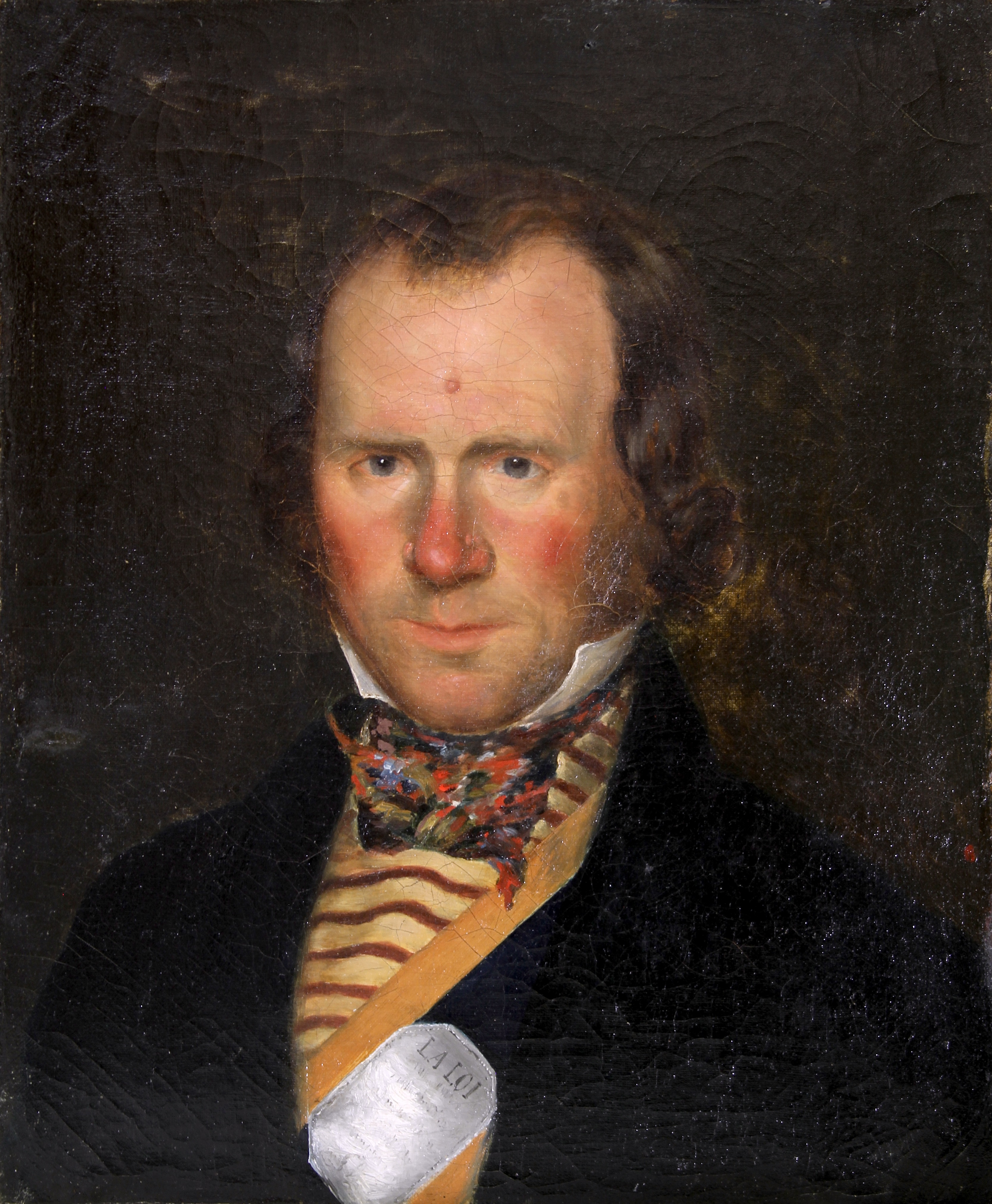
Richard Cobden wearing an Ambassodors badge reading "La Loi", "The Law". Painted by Ary Scheffer

Another free trade initiative was the Cobden-Chevalier Treaty of 1860, promoting closer interdependence between Britain and France. This campaign was conducted in collaboration with John Bright and French economist Michel Chevalier, and succeeded despite Parliament's endemic mistrust of the French.

== Life ==
=== Early years ===
Cobden was born at a farmhouse called Dunford, in Heyshott near Midhurst, in Sussex. He was the fourth of 11 children born to Millicent (née Amber) and William Cobden. His family had been resident in that neighbourhood for many generations, occupied in trade and agriculture. His grandfather, Richard Cobden, owned Bex Mill in Heyshott and was a prosperous maltster who served as bailiff and chief magistrate at Midhurst. His father William however forsook malting in favour of farming, taking over the running of Dunford Farm when Richard died in 1809. A poor business man, he sold the property when the farm failed and moved the family to a smaller farm at nearby Gullard's Oak. Conditions did not improve and by 1814, after several more moves, the family eventually settled as tenant farmers in West Meon, near Alton in Hampshire.

Cobden attended a dame school and then Bowes Hall School in the North Riding of Yorkshire.

=== Early business career ===
When fifteen years of age he went to London to the warehouse business of his uncle Richard Ware Cole where he became a commercial traveller in muslin and calico. His relative, noting the lad's passionate addiction to study, solemnly warned him against indulging such a taste, as likely to prove a fatal obstacle to his success in commercial life. Cobden was undeterred and made good use of the library of the London Institution. When his uncle's business failed, he joined that of Partridge & Price, in Eastcheap, one of the partners being his uncle's former partner.

In 1828, Cobden set up his own business with Sheriff and Gillet, partly with capital from John Lewis, acting as London agents for Fort Brothers, Manchester calico printers. In 1831, the partners sought to lease a factory from Fort's at Sabden, near Clitheroe, Lancashire. They had, however, insufficient capital between them. Cobden and his colleagues so impressed Fort's that they consented to retain a substantial proportion of the equity. The new firm prospered and soon had three establishments – the printing works at Sabden and sales outlets in London and Manchester. The Manchester outlet came under the direct management of Cobden, who settled there in 1832, beginning a long association with the city. He lived in a house on Quay Street, which is now called Cobden House. A plaque commemorates his residency. The success of the enterprise was decisive and rapid, and the "Cobden prints" soon became well known for their quality.

Had Cobden devoted all his energies to the business, he might soon have become very wealthy. His earnings in the business were typically £8,000 to £10,000 a year. However, his lifelong habit of learning and inquiry absorbed much of his time. Writing under the byname Libra, he published many letters in the Manchester Times discussing commercial and economic questions. Some of his ideas were influenced by Adam Smith.

=== First publications ===
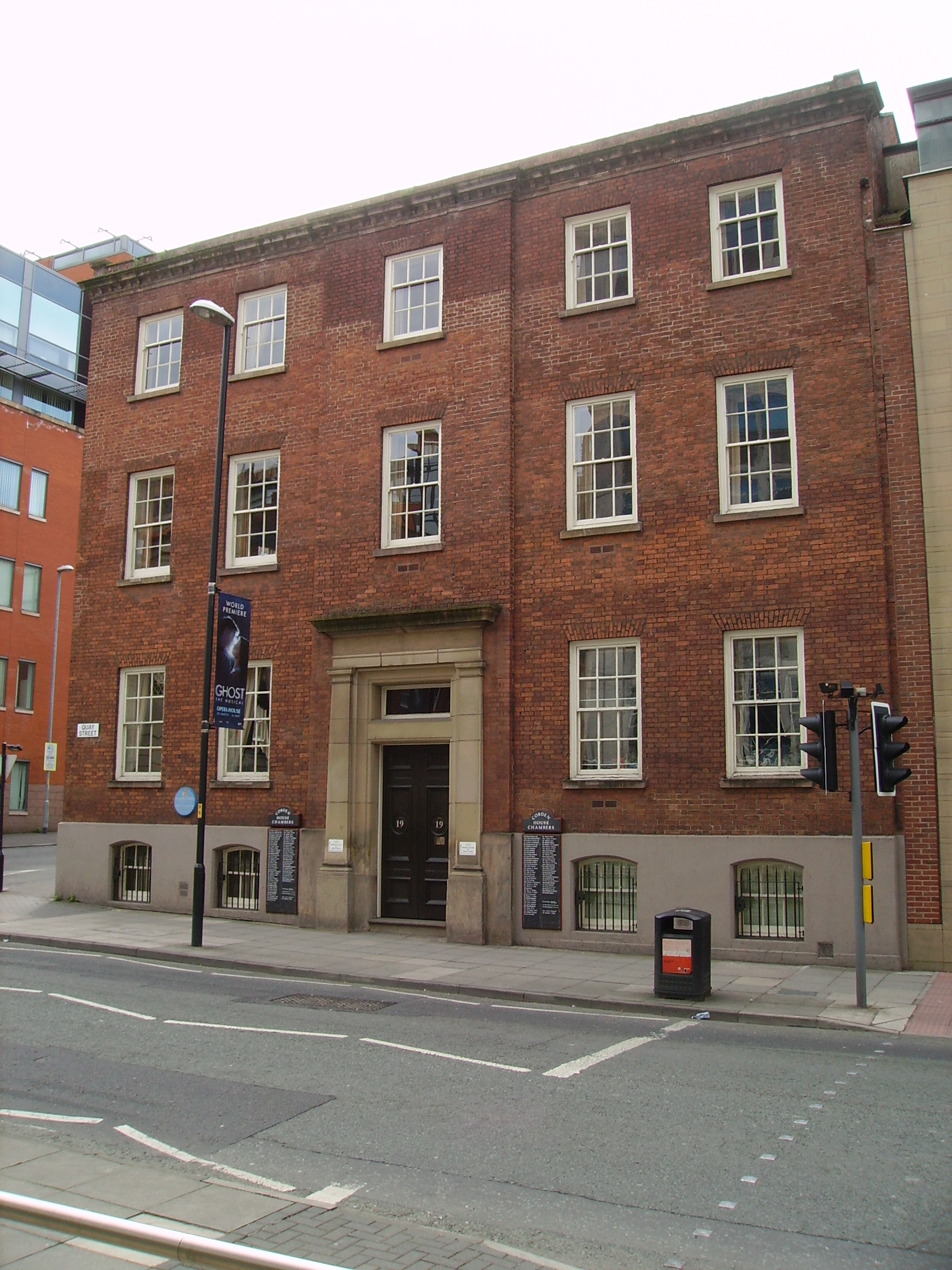
Cobden's Manchester home on Quay Street.

In 1835, he published his first pamphlet, entitled England, Ireland and America, by a Manchester Manufacturer.

Cobden advocated the principles of peace, non-intervention, retrenchment and free trade to which he continued faithfully to abide. He paid a visit to the United States, landing in New York on 7 June 1835. He devoted about three months to this tour, passing rapidly through the seaboard states and the adjacent portion of Canada, and collecting as he went large stores of information respecting the condition, resources and prospects of the nation. Another work appeared towards the end of 1836, under the title of Russia. It was designed to combat a wild outbreak of Russophobia inspired by David Urquhart. It contained also a bold indictment of the whole system of foreign policy founded on ideas of the balance of power and the necessity of large armaments for the protection of commerce.

=== Travel ===
Bad health obliged him to leave Britain, and for several months, at the end of 1836 and the beginning of 1837, he travelled in Spain, Turkey and Egypt. During his visit to Egypt he had an interview with Muhammad Ali, of whose character as a reforming monarch he did not bring away a very favourable impression. He returned to Britain in April 1837. He also visited the United States in this period.

=== First steps in politics ===
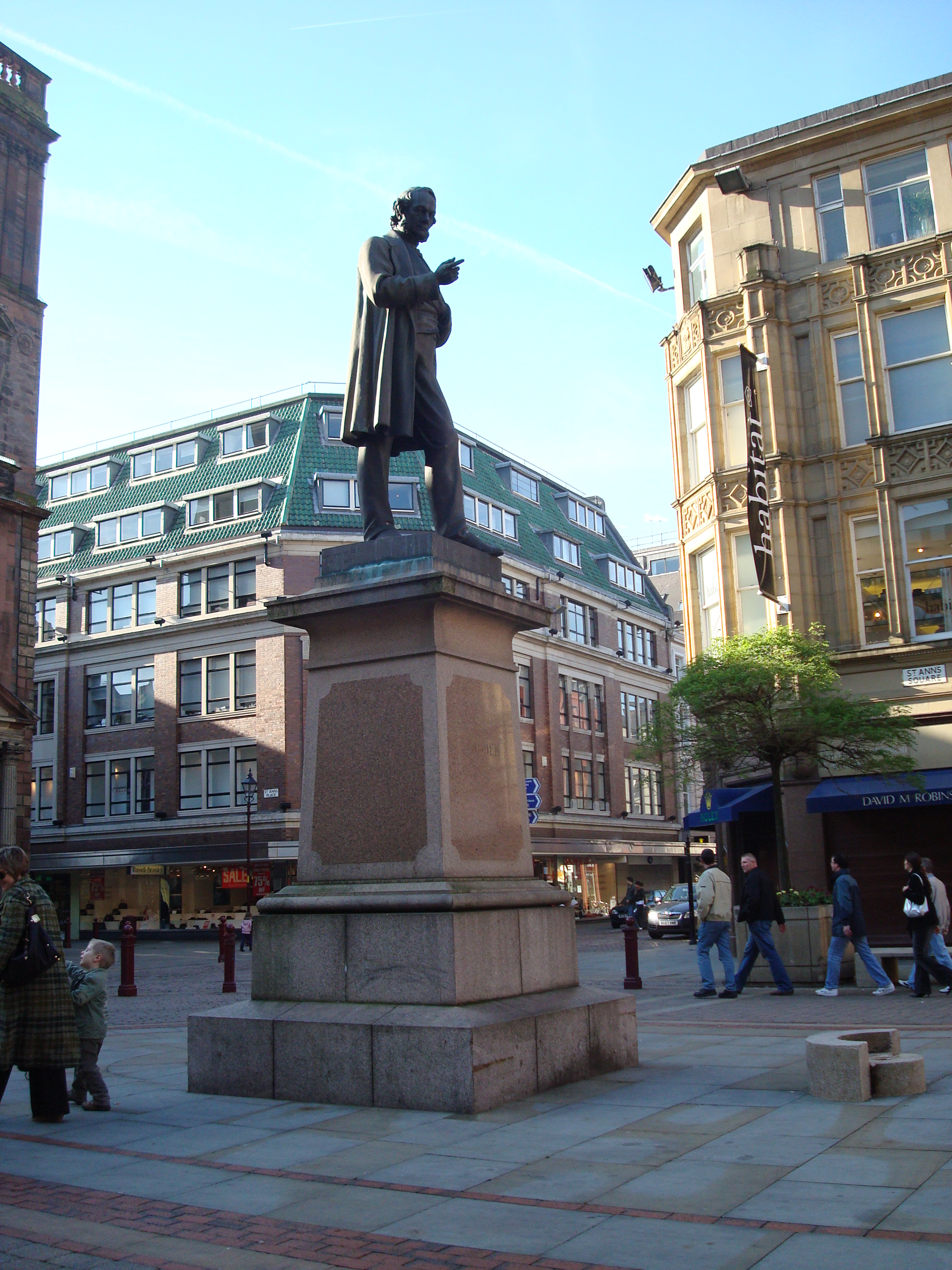
Statue of Richard Cobden outside St Ann's Church, Manchester

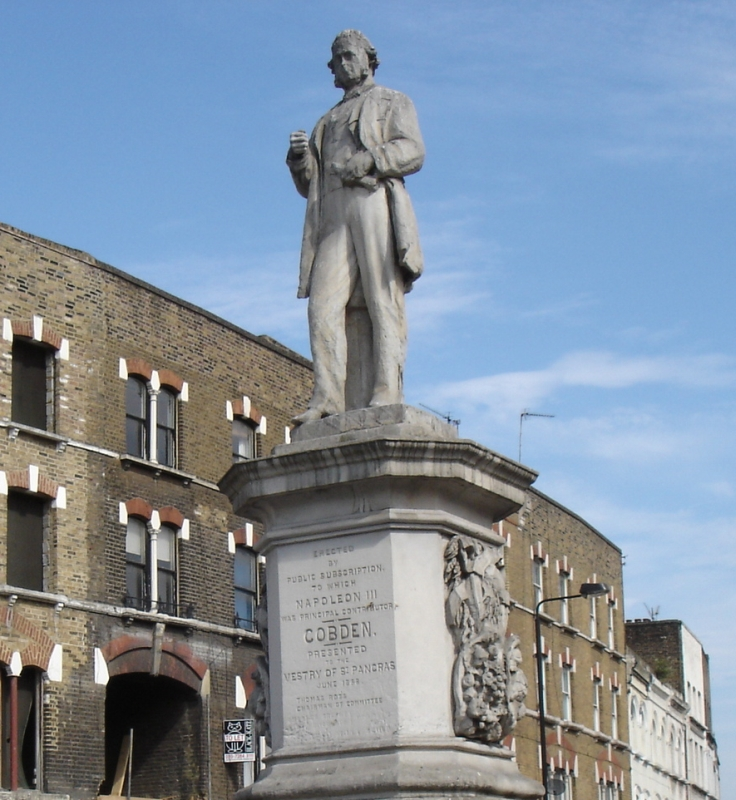
Statue of Richard Cobden on Camden High Street

Cobden soon became a conspicuous figure in Manchester political and intellectual life. He championed the foundation of the Manchester Athenaeum and delivered its inaugural address. He was a member of the chamber of commerce and was part of the campaign for the incorporation of the city, being elected one of its first aldermen. He began also to take a warm interest in the cause of popular education. Some of his first attempts in public speaking were at meetings which he convened at Manchester, Salford, Bolton, Rochdale and other adjacent towns, to advocate the establishment of British schools. It was while on a mission for this purpose to Rochdale that he first formed the acquaintance of John Bright. In 1837, the death of William IV and the accession of Queen Victoria led to the 1837 United Kingdom general election. Cobden was candidate for Stockport, but was narrowly defeated.

Other interests included his friendship with George Combe and his involvement with the Manchester Phrenological Society in the 1830s and 1840s. In 1850, he asked Combe to provide a phrenological reading of his son.

=== Corn Laws ===
The Corn Laws were taxes on imported grain designed to keep prices high for cereal producers in Great Britain. The laws indeed did raise food prices and became the focus of opposition from urban areas, which then had far less political representation than rural Britain. The corn laws imposed steep import duties, reducing the quantity of grain imported from other countries, even when food supplies were short. The laws were supported by Conservative landowners and opposed by Whig industrialists and workers. The Anti–Corn Law League was responsible for turning public and ruling-class opinion against the laws. It was a large, nationwide, middle-class moral crusade with a utopian vision. Its leading advocate was Richard Cobden. According to historian Asa Briggs, Cobden repeatedly promised that repeal would settle four great problems simultaneously:

First, it would guarantee the prosperity of the manufacturer by affording him outlets for his products. Second, it would relieve the 'condition of England question' by cheapening the price of food and ensuring more regular employment. Third, it would make English agriculture more efficient by stimulating demand for its products in urban and industrial areas. Fourth, it would introduce through mutually advantageous international trade a new era of international fellowship and peace. The only barrier to these four beneficent solutions was the ignorant self-interest of the landlords, the 'bread-taxing oligarchy, unprincipled, unfeeling, rapacious and plundering.'

In 1838, the league was formed in Manchester; on Cobden's suggestion, it became a national association, the Anti–Corn Law League. During the league's seven years, Cobden was its chief spokesman and animating spirit. He was not afraid to take his challenge in person to the agricultural landlords or to confront the working class Chartists, led by Feargus O'Connor.

In 1841, Sir Robert Peel having defeated the Melbourne ministry in parliament, there was a general election, and Cobden was returned as the new member for Stockport. His opponents had confidently predicted that he would fail utterly in the House of Commons. He did not wait long after his admission into that assembly in bringing their predictions to the test. Parliament met on 19 August. On the 24th, during the debate on the Queen's Speech, Cobden delivered his first address. "It was remarked," reported Harriet Martineau in her History of the Peace, "that he was not treated in the House with the courtesy usually accorded to a new member, and it was perceived that he did not need such observance." Undeterred, he gave a simple and forceful exposition of his position on the Corn Laws. This marked the start of his reputation as a master of the issues.

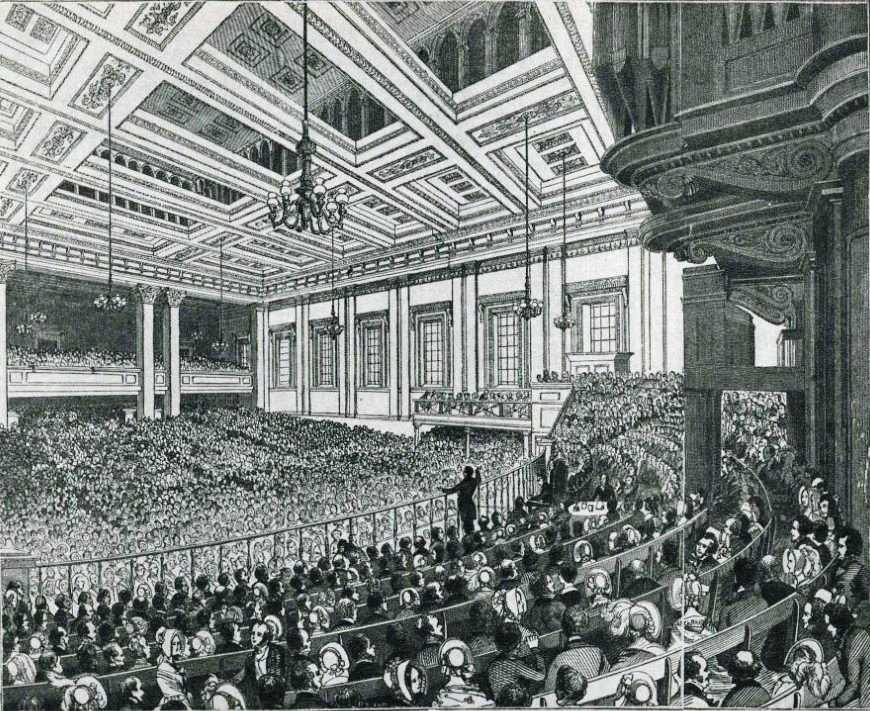
Meeting of the Anti–Corn Law League in Exeter Hall in 1846

On 21 April 1842, with 67 other MPs, Cobden voted for the motion of William Sharman Crawford (a fellow Anti–Corn Law Leaguer) to form a committee to consider the demands of the People's Charter (1838): votes for working men, protected by secret ballot.

On 17 February 1843, Cobden launched an attack on Peel, holding him responsible for the miserable and disaffected state of the nation's workers. Peel did not respond in the debate but the speech was made at a time of heightened political feelings. Edward Drummond, Peel's private secretary, had recently been mistaken for the prime minister and shot dead in the street by a lunatic. However, later in the evening, Peel referred in excited and agitated tones to the remark, as an incitement to violence against his person. Peel's Tory party, catching at this hint, threw themselves into a frantic state of excitement, and when Cobden attempted to explain that he meant official, not personal responsibility, he was drowned out.

Peel reversed his position and in 1846 called for the repeal of the Corn Laws. Cobden and the League had prepared the moment for years but they played little role in 1846. After Peel's aggressive politicking, the repeal of the Corn Laws passed the House of Commons on 16 May 1846 by 98 votes. Peel had formed a coalition of the Conservative leadership and a third of its MPs joining with the Whigs, with two-thirds of the Conservatives voting against him. That split Peel's Tory party and led to the fall of his government.

In Peel's resignation speech he credited Cobden, more than anyone else, with the repeal of the Corn Laws.

=== Tribute, journey and resettlement ===
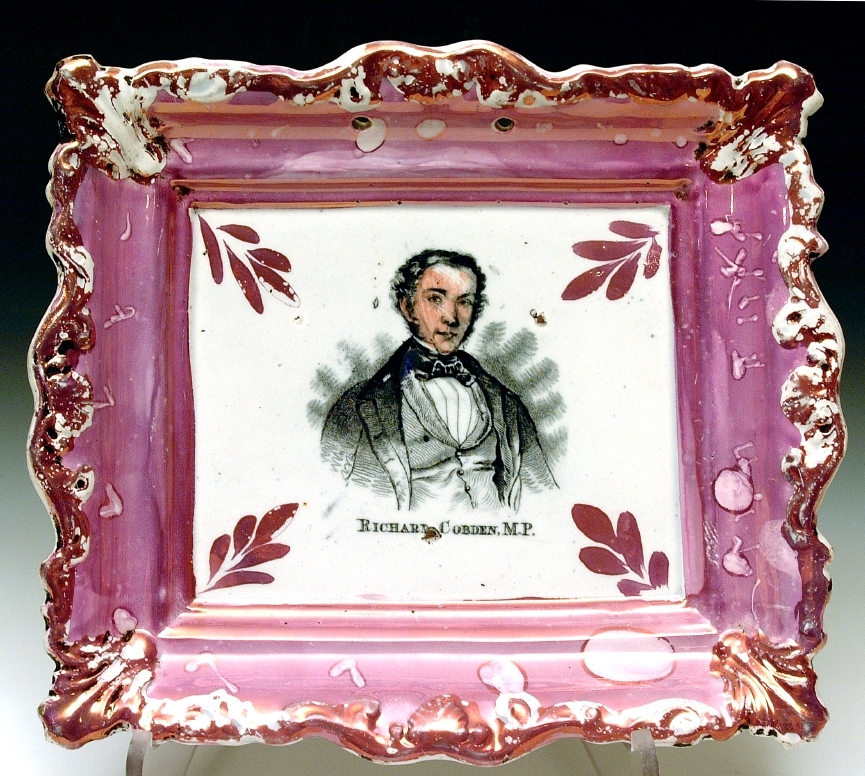
Sunderland Lustreware "splash" plaque.

Cobden had sacrificed his business, his domestic comforts and for a time his health to the campaign. His friends therefore felt that the nation owed him some substantial token of gratitude and admiration for those sacrifices. Public subscription raised the sum of £80,000. Had he been inspired with personal ambition, he might have entered upon the race of political advancement with the prospect of attaining the highest office. Lord John Russell, who, soon after the repeal of the Corn Laws, succeeded Peel as prime minister, invited Cobden to join his government but Cobden declined the invitation.

Cobden had hoped to find some restorative privacy abroad but his fame had spread throughout Europe and he found himself lionised by the radical movement. In July 1846, he wrote to a friend "I am going to tell you of a fresh project that has been brewing in my brain. I have given up all idea of burying myself in Egypt or Italy. I am going on an agitating tour through the continent of Europe." He referred to invitations he had received from France, Prussia, Austria, Russia and Spain and added,

Well, I will, with God's assistance during the next twelve months, visit all the large states of Europe, see their potentates or statesmen, and endeavour to enforce those truths which have been irresistible at home. Why should I rust in inactivity? If the public spirit of my countrymen affords me the means of travelling as their missionary, I will be the first ambassador from the people of this country to the nations of the continent. I am impelled to this by an instinctive emotion such as has never deceived me. I feel that I could succeed in making out a stronger case for the prohibitive nations of Europe to compel them to adopt a freer system than I had here to overturn our protection policy.

He visited in succession France, Spain, Italy, Germany and Russia, and was honoured everywhere he went. He not only addressed public demonstrations but also had several private audiences with leading statesmen. During his absence there was a general election, and he was returned (1847) for Stockport and for the West Riding of Yorkshire. He chose to sit for the latter.

In June 1848 Richard Cobden moved his family from Manchester to Paddington, London, taking a house at 103 Westbourne Terrace. In 1847 he had also repurchased the old family home at Dunford and in 1852 or 1853 rebuilt the house there, which he then continued to occupy until his death.

=== Pacifist activism ===
When Cobden returned from abroad, he addressed himself to what seemed to him the logical complement of free trade, namely, the promotion of peace and the reduction of naval and military armaments. He was a supporter of non-interventionism and his abhorrence of war amounted to a passion and, in fact, his campaigns against the Corn Laws were motivated by his belief that free trade was a powerful force for peace and defence against war. He knowingly exposed himself to the risk of ridicule and the reproach of utopianism. In 1849, he brought forward a proposal in parliament in favour of international arbitration, and, in 1851, a motion for mutual reduction of armaments. He was not successful in either case, nor did he expect to be. In pursuance of the same object, he identified himself with a series of peace congresses which from 1848 to 1851 were held successively in Brussels, Paris, Frankfurt, London, Manchester and Edinburgh.

On the establishment of the Second French Empire in 1851–1852, a violent panic, fuelled by the press, gripped the public. Louis Napoleon was represented as contemplating a sudden and piratical descent upon the British coast without pretext or provocation. By a series of speeches and pamphlets, in and out of parliament, Cobden sought to calm the passions of his countrymen. In doing so, he sacrificed the great popularity he had won as the champion of free trade, and became for a time the best-abused man in Britain.

However, owing to the quarrel about the religious sites of Palestine, which arose in the east of Europe, public opinion suddenly veered round, and all the suspicion and hatred which had been directed against the emperor of the French were diverted from him to the emperor of Russia. Louis Napoleon was taken into favour as Britain's faithful ally, and in a whirlwind of popular excitement the nation was swept into the Crimean War.

Again confronting public sentiment, Cobden, who had travelled in Turkey, and had studied its politics, was dismissive of the outcry about maintaining the independence and integrity of the Ottoman Empire. He denied that it was possible to maintain them, and no less strenuously denied that it was desirable. He believed that the jealousy of Russian aggrandisement and the dread of Russian power were absurd exaggerations. He maintained that the future of European Turkey was in the hands of the Christian population, and that it would have been wiser for Britain to ally herself with them rather than with what he saw as the doomed and decaying Islamic power. He said in the House of Commons

You must address yourselves as men of sense and men of energy, to the question – what are you to do with the Christian population? For Mahommedanism [Islam] cannot be maintained, and I should be sorry to see this country fighting for the maintenance of Mahommedanism ... You may keep Turkey on the map of Europe, you may call the country by the name of Turkey if you like, but do not think you can keep up the Mahommedan rule in the country.

The torrent of popular sentiment in favour of war was, however, irresistible; and both Cobden and John Bright were overwhelmed with obloquy. Karl Marx wrote "And without total abandonment of the law of the Koran [argues opposition MP Cobden], it was impossible to put the Christians of Turkey upon an equality with the Turks. We may as well ask Mr Cobden whether, with the existing State Church and laws of England, it is possible to put her working-men upon an equality with the Cobdens and the Brights?"

=== Second Opium War ===
At the beginning of 1857 tidings from China reached Britain of a rupture between the British plenipotentiary in that country and the governor of the Canton province in reference to a small vessel or lorcha called the Arrow, which had resulted in the British admiral destroying the river forts, burning 23 ships belonging to the Qing Navy and bombarding the city of Canton. After a careful investigation of the official documents, Cobden became convinced that those were utterly unrighteous proceedings. He brought forward a motion in parliament to this effect, which led to a long and memorable debate, lasting over four nights, in which he was supported by Sidney Herbert, Sir James Graham, William Gladstone, Lord John Russell and Benjamin Disraeli, and which ended in the defeat of Lord Palmerston by a majority of sixteen.

But this triumph cost him his seat in parliament. On the dissolution which followed Lord Palmerston's defeat, Cobden became candidate for Huddersfield, but the voters of that town gave the preference to his opponent, who had supported the Russian war and approved of the proceedings at Canton. Cobden was thus relegated to private life, and retiring to his country house at Dunford, he spent his time in perfect contentment in cultivating his land and feeding his pigs.

He took advantage of this season of leisure to pay another visit to the United States. During his absence the general election of 1859 occurred, when he was returned unopposed for Rochdale. Lord Palmerston was again prime minister, and having discovered that the advanced liberal party was not so easily "crushed" as he had apprehended, he made overtures of reconciliation, and invited Cobden and Thomas Milner Gibson to become members of his government. In a frank, cordial letter which was delivered to Cobden on his landing in Liverpool, Lord Palmerston offered him the role of President of the Board of Trade, with a seat in the Cabinet. Many of his friends urgently pressed him to accept but without a moment's hesitation he determined to decline the proposed honour. On his arrival in London he called on Lord Palmerston, and with the utmost frankness told him that he had opposed and denounced him so frequently in public, and that he still differed so widely from his views, especially on questions of foreign policy, that he could not, without doing violence to his own sense of duty and consistency, serve under him as minister. Lord Palmerston tried good-humouredly to combat his objections, but without success.

=== Cobden–Chevalier Treaty ===
Though Cobden declined to share the responsibility of Lord Palmerston's administration, he was willing to act as its representative in promoting freer commercial intercourse between Britain and France. But the negotiations for this purpose originated with himself in conjunction with Bright and Michel Chevalier. Towards the close of 1859 he called upon Lord Palmerston, Lord John Russell and Gladstone, and signified his intention to visit France and get into communication with Napoleon III of France and his ministers, with a view to promoting this object. These statesmen expressed in general terms their approval of his purpose, but he went entirely on his own account, clothed at first with no official authority. On his arrival in Paris he had a long audience with Napoleon, in which he urged many arguments in favour of removing those obstacles which prevented the two countries from being brought into closer dependence on one another, and he succeeded in making a considerable impression on his mind in favour of free trade. He then addressed himself to the French ministers, and had much earnest conversation, especially with Eugène Rouher, whom he found well inclined to the economical and commercial principles which he advocated. After a good deal of time spent in these preliminary and unofficial negotiations, the question of a treaty of commerce between the two countries having entered into the arena of diplomacy, Cobden was requested by the British government to act as their plenipotentiary in the matter in conjunction with Henry Wellesley, 1st Earl Cowley, their ambassador in France. But it proved a very long and laborious undertaking. He had to contend with the bitter hostility of the French protectionists, which occasioned a good deal of vacillation on the part of the emperor and his ministers. There were also delays, hesitations and cavils at home, which were more inexplicable.

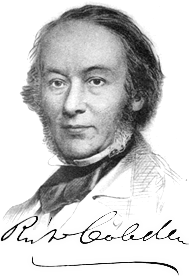

He was, moreover, assailed with great violence by a powerful section of the British press, while the large number of minute details with which he had to deal in connection with proposed changes in the French tariff, involved a tax on his patience and industry which would have daunted a less resolute man. But there was one source of embarrassment greater than all the rest. One strong motive which had impelled him to engage in this enterprise was his anxious desire to establish more friendly relations between Britain and France, and to dispel those feelings of mutual jealousy and alarm which were so frequently breaking forth and jeopardizing peace between the two countries. This was the most powerful argument with which he had plied the emperor and the members of the French government, and which he had found most efficacious with them. But while he was in the midst of the negotiations, Lord Palmerston brought forward in the House of Commons a measure for fortifying the naval arsenals of Britain, which he introduced in a warlike speech pointedly directed against France, as the source of danger of invasion and attack, against which it was necessary to guard. This produced irritation and resentment in Paris, and but for the influence which Cobden had acquired, and the perfect trust reposed in his sincerity, the negotiations would probably have been altogether wrecked. At last, however, after nearly twelve months' incessant labour, the work was completed in November 1860. "Rare," said Mr Gladstone, "is the privilege of any man who, having fourteen years ago rendered to his country one signal service, now again, within the same brief span of life, decorated neither by land nor title, bearing no mark to distinguish him from the people he loves, has been permitted to perform another great and memorable service to his sovereign and his country."

On the conclusion of this work honours were offered to Cobden by the governments of both the countries which he had so greatly benefited. Lord Palmerston offered him a baronetcy and a seat in the privy council, and the emperor of the French would gladly have conferred upon him some distinguished mark of his favour. But with characteristic disinterestedness and modesty he declined all such honours.

Cobden's efforts in furtherance of free trade were always subordinated to what he deemed the highest moral purposes: the promotion of peace on earth and goodwill among men. This was his desire and hope as respects the commercial treaty with France. He was therefore deeply disappointed and distressed to find the old feeling of distrust still actively fomented by the press and some of the leading politicians of the country. In 1862 he published his pamphlet entitled The Three Panics, the object of which was to trace the history and expose the folly of those periodical visitations of alarm as to French designs with which Britain had been afflicted for the preceding fifteen or sixteen years.

=== American Civil War ===
When the American Civil War threatened to break out in the United States, Cobden was deeply distressed, but after the conflict became inevitable his sympathies were wholly with the Union because the Confederacy was fighting for slavery. Nonetheless, his great anxiety was that the British nation should not be committed to any unworthy course during the progress of that struggle. When relations with the United States were becoming critical and menacing as a consequence of depredations committed against the United States by aid to the Confederacy from blockade runners and Confederate commerce raiders issuing from British ports respectively, actions that would lead to the post-war Alabama Claims, he brought the question before the House of Commons in a series of speeches of rare clearness and force. In an 1862 speech in Rochdale about the Lancashire Cotton Famine he said that "t would be cheaper to keep the whole population of the cotton districts [...] on turtle, champagne and venison than to send to America to obtain cotton by force of arms".

=== Character and motivations ===
Cobden was characterised from his early years by energy and sociability, but also particularly by a desire to learn and understand the traits of the world, a characteristic that stayed with him throughout his life. He had many friends from many walks of life.

Disraeli commended Cobden on his careful art of avoiding to drive his arguments to an extremity, which was one secret of his singular persuasiveness.

Cobden may have been disappointed that improvements in material wealth did not bring moral improvements. He wrote towards the end of his life "Nations have not yet learnt to bear prosperity, liberty, and peace. They will learn it in a higher state of civilization. We think we are the models for posterity, when we are little better than beacons to help it to avoid the rocks and quicksands. The world is sadly slow to learn..."

== Death ==
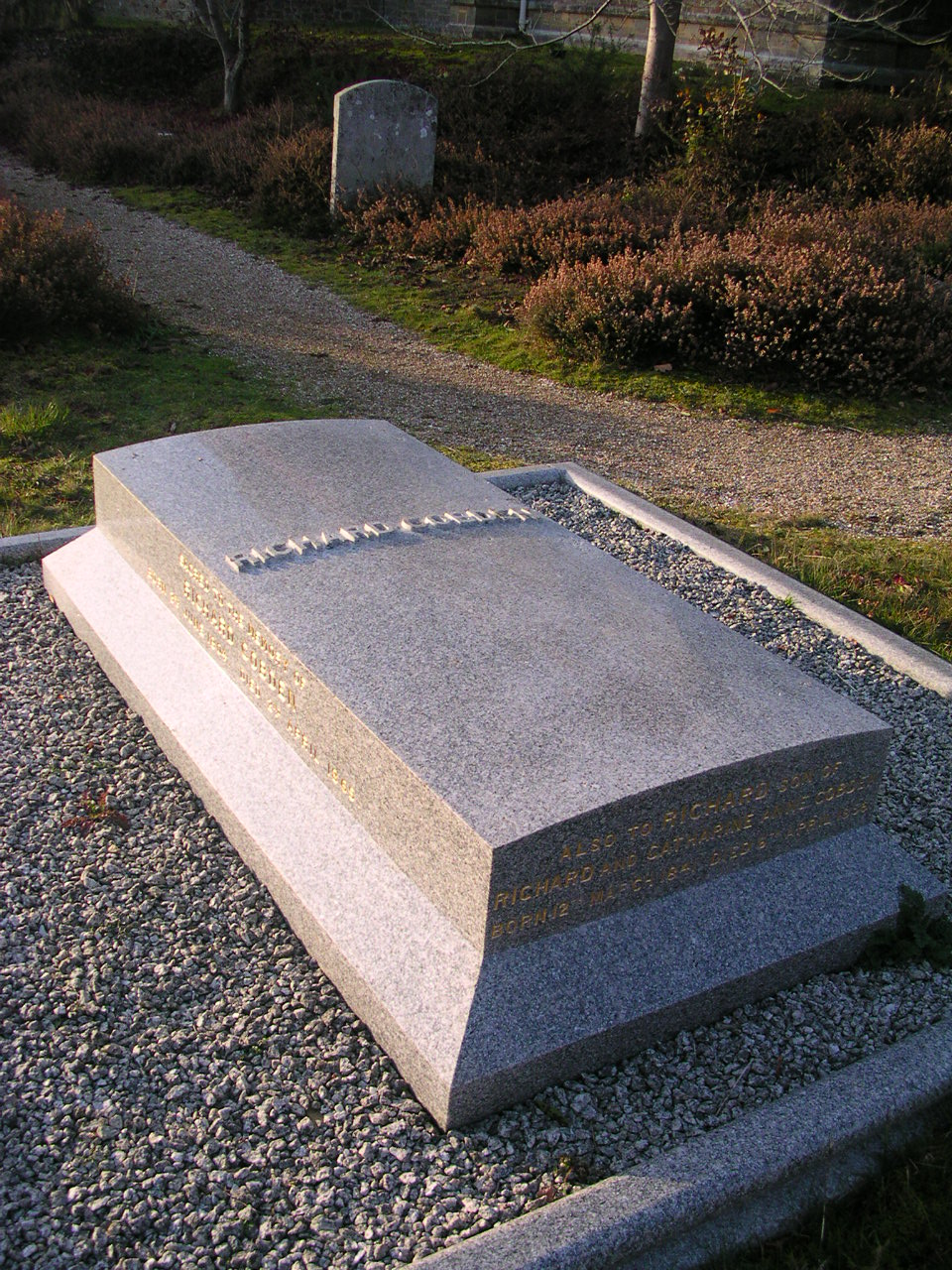
Cobden's grave in West Lavington churchyard in West Sussex

For several years Cobden was unwell with bronchial irritation and difficulty of breathing. Owing to this he had spent the winter of 1860 in Algeria, and every subsequent winter he confined himself to the house, especially in damp and foggy weather. He remained intellectually engaged in seeking international peace and other themes. On 2 April 1865 he died peacefully at his apartments in London. He was buried at West Lavington church in West Sussex on 7 April. A large funeral procession assembled at Cocking Causeway to process to the church a mile away. His grave was surrounded by a large crowd of mourners, among whom were Gladstone, Bright, Milner Gibson, Charles Villiers and a host besides from all parts of the country.

=== Tributes ===
On the day after his death Lord Palmerston said "it was not possible for the House to proceed to business without every member recalling to his mind the great loss which the House and country had sustained by the event which took place yesterday morning." Disraeli said that the verdict of posterity would be that Cobden was the greatest political character that the pure middle class of this country had yet produced, and that he "was an ornament to the House of Commons and an honour to England."

In the French Corps Législatif, also, the vice-president, Forcade La Roquette, referred to his death, and warm expressions of esteem were repeated and applauded on every side. "The death of Richard Cobden," said M. la Roquette, "is not alone a misfortune for England (UK), but a cause of mourning for France and humanity." Drouyn de Lhuys, the French minister of foreign affairs, made his death the subject of a special despatch, desiring the French ambassador to express to the government "the mournful sympathy and truly national regret which the death, as lamented as premature, of Richard Cobden had excited on that side of the English Channel ... He is above all", he added, "in our eyes the representative of those sentiments and those cosmopolitan principles before which national frontiers and rivalries disappear; whilst essentially of his country, he was still more of his time; he knew what mutual relations could accomplish in our day for the prosperity of peoples. Cobden, if I may be permitted to say so, was an international man."

Cobden has been called "the greatest classical-liberal thinker on international affairs" by the libertarian and historian Ralph Raico.

== Personal life ==
He was elected to the membership of Manchester Literary and Philosophical Society on 29 April 1836 and in 1840, Cobden married Catherine Anne Williams, a Welsh woman. They had five surviving daughters. Of these, Jane, a British Liberal politician, married the publisher Thomas Fisher Unwin and was known as Mrs Cobden Unwin; Ellen was a published writer and the first of the painter Walter Sickert's three wives; and Anne married the bookbinder T.J. Sanderson and he added her surname to his. In 1856, their only son died aged 15 after a short scarlet fever illness. Two other children died in infancy.

Cobden was committed to his family, although his public life was absorbing.

== Legacy ==
Cobden, and what was called "Cobdenism" and later identified with laissez-faire, was subjected to much criticism from the school of British economists who advocated protectionism, on the ideas of Alexander Hamilton and Friedrich List. However, during much of what remained of the nineteenth century, his success with the free-trade movement was unchallenged, and protectionism came to be heterodox. The tariff reform movement in Britain started by Joseph Chamberlain brought new opponents of Manchesterism, and the whole subject once more became controversial. The years of reconstruction following World War II saw a renewed fashion for government intervention in international trade but, starting in the 1980s, Margaret Thatcher in the UK (under the influence of Enoch Powell via Keith Joseph) and Ronald Reagan in the U.S. led a revival of laissez-faire that, as of 2006, holds some sway in mainstream economic thinking.

Cobden left a deep mark on British history. Although he was not a "scientific economist", many of his ideas and prophecies prefigured arguments and perspectives that would later appear in academic economics. He considered that it was "natural" for Britain to manufacture for the world and exchange for agricultural products of other countries. Modern economists call this comparative advantage. He advocated the repeal of the Corn Laws, which not only made food cheaper, but helped develop industry and benefit labour. He correctly saw that other countries would be unable to compete with Britain in manufacture in the foreseeable future. "We advocate", he said, "nothing but what is agreeable to the highest behests of Christianity – to buy in the cheapest market, and sell in the dearest." After the repeal of the Corn Laws, British manufacturing did see significant productivity rises, while British agriculture ultimately went into decline due to import competition. He perceived that the rest of the world should follow Britain's example: "if you abolish the corn-laws honestly, and adopt free trade in its simplicity, there will not be a tariff in Europe that will not be changed in less than five years" (January 1846). His cosmopolitanism, which led to the perception among Cobden's rivals that he was a Little Englander" – led him to develop an opposition to colonialism. Cobden also saw the connection between peace and free trade. "Peace will come to earth when the people have more to do with each other and governments less." "The great rule of conduct for us in regard to foreign nations is – in extending our commercial relations – to have with them as little political connection as possible."

His biography, Richard Cobden's Life by John Morley, written with the input of contemporaries such as John Bright and Sir Louis Mallet, was published in 1881 (Roberts Brothers: Boston).

In 1866, the Cobden Club was founded to promote "Peace, Free Trade and Goodwill Among Nations". This was due to the efforts of Thomas Bayley Potter, Cobden's successor at his Rochdale seat, who wanted an institution which would support Cobden's principles. On 15 May 1866 the inaugural meeting of the club was held at the Reform Club in London and the first club dinner was held on 21 July 1866 at the Star and Garter Hotel in Richmond, presided over by Gladstone. The club energetically diffused free trade literature for propaganda purposes.

Prizes were instituted in Cobden's name at Oxford and Cambridge.

Joseph Chamberlain's proposal for Tariff Reform, launched in 1903, reignited the free trade versus protectionism debate in Britain. For the centenary of Cobden's birth 10,000 people assembled at Alexandra Palace in London in June 1904. Cobden "symbolized the liberal vision of a peaceful, prosperous global order held together by the benign forces of Free Trade" like no other nineteenth century figure. Addressing the meeting, the Liberal leader Sir Henry Campbell-Bannerman said:

The motive which inspired those who composed the assemblage was twofold. They wished to show their admiration of, and their gratitude towards, a great Englishman whose sympathetic heart, wisdom, intuition, courage and praise-worthy eloquence wrought for them a great deliverance in the days of their fathers. They also wished to declare their adherence to the doctrines which he taught, and their determination that the power of those doctrines should not, God helping them, be impaired. What they owed to him and to themselves was to make it clear in the sight of all men that they meant to hold fast to the heritage which he, perhaps more than any other individual, won for them; and that the fruits of the battle which he waged against tremendous odds should not be lightly wrested from them. They were not there to acclaim Cobden as an inspired prophet, but they saw in him a great citizen, a great statesman, a great patriot, and a great and popular leader... Cobden spent his life in pulling down those artificial restrictions and obstructions which at the present time rash and reckless men were seeking to set up again – obstructions not merely to commerce, but also to peace and good will, and mutual understanding; yes, and obstructions to liberty and good government at home. Those who expressed astonishment that the intelligent workman did not look askance at the manufacturer, Cobden, had overlooked the fact that he gave the people cheap food and abundant employment, and did far more; that he exploded the economic basis of class government and class subjection.

Stanley Baldwin said in December 1930, during the Great Depression, that the Conservatives were "a national party of all those who believe that any improvement in the industrial and economic position of this country can only be achieved by cutting loose from the Cobdenism of the last generation and putting this country on what is and must be a protectionist basis". Two weeks later Baldwin attacked the Labour government's handling of the Imperial Conference: "At that Conference the Government had a splendid opportunity of doing something practical to help British industry and to bind the Empire together in a close partnership of trade. They failed to seize this opportunity because the Dominion proposals could not be reconciled with the ancient and obsolete free-trade theories of Cobdenism". Britain abandoned free trade in 1932 and adopted a general tariff. In 1932 the former Labour Chancellor of the Exchequer Philip Snowden said there was never a greater mistake than to say that Cobdenism was dead: "Cobdenism was never more alive throughout the world than it was to-day.... To-day the ideas of Cobden were in revolt against selfish nationalism. The need for the breaking down of trade restrictions, which took various forms, was universally recognized even by those who were unable to throw off those shackles". F. W. Hirst said in 1941, during the Second World War, that Cobden's ideas "stand out in almost complete opposition to the 'gospel' according to Marx":

Cobden's international ideas were based on patriotism and peace, the harmony of classes, reform by constitutional methods, goodwill among men and nations. Cobden... believed in individual liberty and enterprise, in free markets, freedom of opinion and freedom of trade. [His] whole creed was anathema to Karl Marx. He had no sense of patriotism or love of country. He urged what he called "the proletariat" in all countries to overthrow society by a violent revolution, to destroy the middle classes and all employers of labour, whom he denounced as capitalists and slave drivers. He demanded the confiscation of private property and a new dictatorship, the dictatorship of the proletariat. Just as Cobden interpreted and practised the precepts of Adam Smith, so Lenin interpreted and practised the precepts of Karl Marx. These two great men though dead yet speak. They stand out before the civilised world as protagonists of two systems of political economy, political thought and human society... when this war is over, we in Britain will certainly have to choose whether our Press and Parliament are to be free, whether we are to be a conscript nation, whether private property and savings are to be secured or confiscated, whether we are to be imprisoned without trial; whether we are again to enjoy the right of buying and selling where and how we please – in short whether we are to be ruled as slaves by the bureaucracy of a police state or as free men by our chosen representatives. This conflict will be symbolised and personified by Richard Cobden and Karl Marx.

Ernest Bevin, Labour Foreign Secretary, said on 26 July 1947 that "We cannot go back to the Cobdenite economy". In 1966 the Labour Prime Minister Harold Wilson attacked Philip Snowden for holding the views of "Puritan Cobdenism" which "prevented any expansionist action to relieve unemployment" by the government during the Great Depression.

=== Locations ===
Cobden's great-great-great- grandson, Nick Cobden-Wright, started a campaign to save his former home, Dunford House, Midhurst (also home to his daughter Annie, a socialist and suffragette) from sale in 2019 by its owners, the YMCA. It contained her banner 'No Vote No Tax' which she had held at the Downing Street protest. His Cobden Foundation campaign was backed by Emmeline Pankhurst's great-granddaughter, Helen Pankhurst, CBE, among others.

The communities of Cobden, Ontario, Cobden, Illinois, Cobden, Minnesota and Cobden, Victoria in Canada, the U.S. and Australia, respectively, were all named after Richard Cobden.

Cob Stenham was also named after him.

Cobden in the South Island of New Zealand is named after him.

Richard Cobden Primary School in Camden Town and Grade II listed Cobden Working Mens Club in Kensal Road, North Kensington, London are named after him.

Cobden Bridge in Southampton was named after him.

Cobden Street in Bury, Darlington, Dalton in Furness Nottingham and Nelson, Lancashire are all named after him. There is a Cobden Square in Bedford and a Cobden Road in Worthing and Midhurst. Next to Cobden Street in Nottingham there is also Bright Street. There are two Cobden Streets in Burnley, Lancashire.. In Edinburgh there is a Cobden Street and a Cobden Terrace.

The Richard Cobden pub in Worthing is named after him and the Cobden View pub in Sheffield has his face above the door. There was a Richard Cobden pub in Cocking, West Sussex which closed and became a private residence in the 20th century. The Richard Cobden pub in Chatham, Kent is named after him and later became the subject of the song The Richard Cobden by the UK band Vlks. There is also a pub in Quarry Street, Woolton, Liverpool named The Cobden, with his image on the external sign board.

=== Statues ===
A bronze statue of Cobden is in St Ann's Square in Manchester (pictured above) and his bust is in Manchester Town Hall.

There is a statue of him, funded by public subscription (to which Napoléon III is said to have contributed) in the square by Mornington Crescent Underground station, Camden Town, London. The Cobden pub on Camden High Street is in turn named after the statue.

The statue of Cobden in Stockport town centre was moved in 2006 as part of an urban regeneration scheme, but is now back in place.

Inside the Bradford Wool Exchange, West Yorkshire, there is a statue of Cobden.

Outside the Wool Exchange, between the ground floor arches, are carved portraits of notable people, including Cobden (the others are Titus Salt, Stephenson, Watt, Arkwright, Jacquard, Gladstone and Palmerston and (facing Bank Street) Raleigh, Drake, Columbus, Cook and Anson). Flanking the porched entrance below the tower are statues of Bishop Blaise, the patron saint of woolcombers, and King Edward III, who greatly promoted the wool trade.

An obelisk erected in Cobden's memory in 1868 is located at West Lavington in West Sussex. Upon the statue are the words "Free Trade. Peace Goodwill Among Nations".

==== Bust ====
A bust of Cobden is located in the west aisle of the north transept of Westminster Abbey.

=== Miscellaneous ===
Cobden Press, an American libertarian publisher of the 1980s, was named after him, and continues to this day as imprint of the Moorfield Storey Institute. Cobden was named by Ferdinand de Lesseps as a founder of the Suez Canal Company. Hungarian Cobden Association was named after him in 1921.

Parliament of the United Kingdom
Preceded by Thomas Marsland; Henry Marsland	Member of Parliament for Stockport; 1841–1847; With: Henry Marsland	Succeeded by James Heald; James Kershaw
Preceded by Viscount Morpeth; Edmund Beckett Denison	Member of Parliament for West Riding of Yorkshire; 1847 – 1857; With: Viscount Morpeth to 1848; Edmund Beckett Denison from 1848	Succeeded by Viscount Goderich; Edmund Beckett Denison
Preceded by Sir Alexander Ramsay	Member of Parliament for Rochdale; 1859–1865	Succeeded by Thomas Potter
