= Ellen Melicent Cobden =

British writer and suffragist (1848–1914)

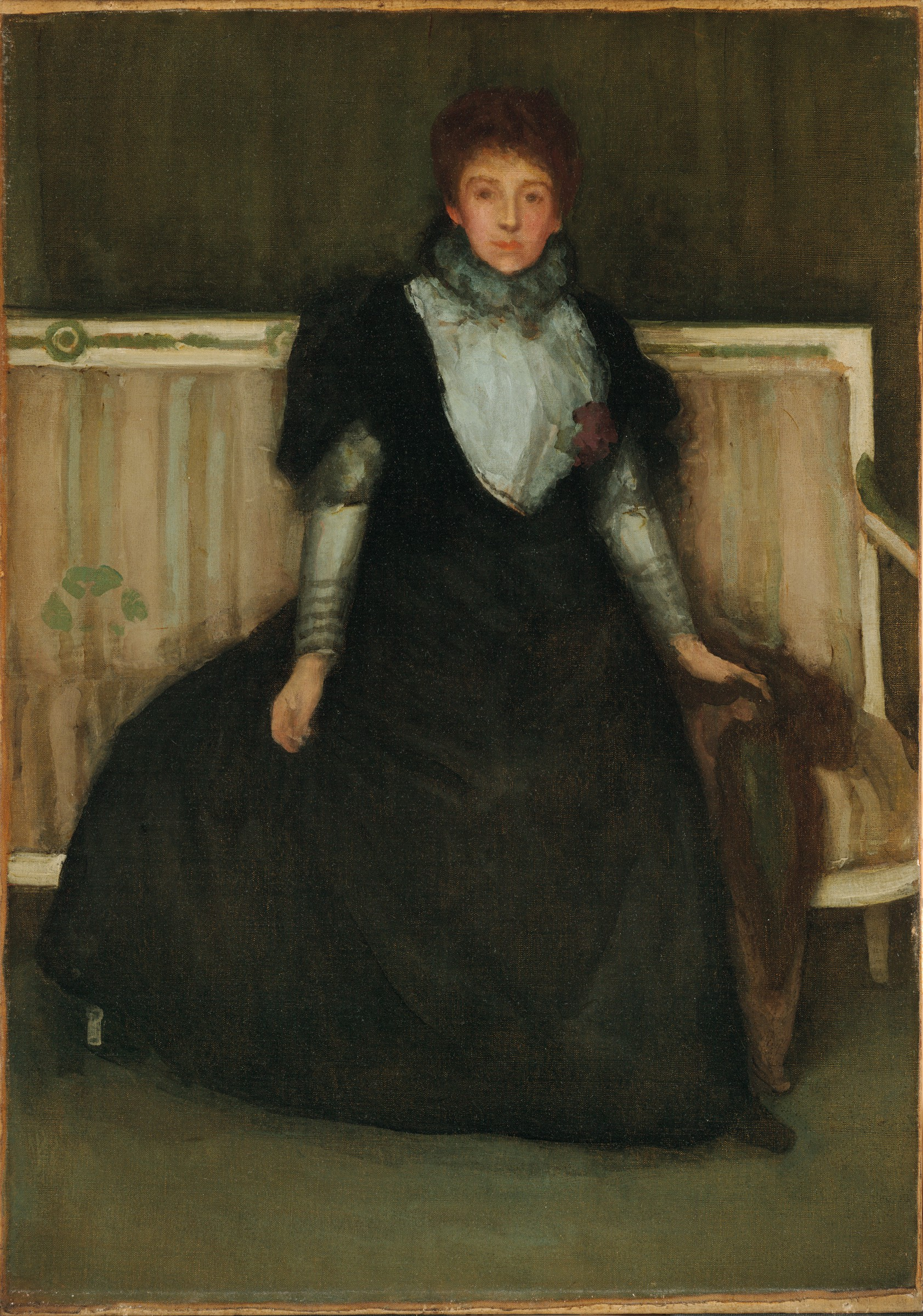
- Cobden in the painting Green and Violet, Mrs. Walter Sickert by James McNeill Whistler, held at the Fogg Museum, Massachusetts
- Born: 18 August 1848; Manchester, England
- Died: 4 September 1914 (aged 66)
- Spouse: Walter Richard Sickert (m. 1885, div. 1900)
- Relatives: Richard Cobden MP (father); Anne Cobden-Sanderson (sister); Jane Cobden (sister)
- Writing career
- Notable works: The Rights of Women (1879); Sylvia Saxon – Episodes in a Life (1914)

Ellen 'Nellie' Millicent Ashburner Sickert (née Cobden, 18 August 1848 – 4 September 1914), was a British writer, radical campaigner and suffragist. She supported the Irish Home Rule movement, South Africa Conciliation Committee, Women's Social and Political Union and the Women's Freedom League. She published two books and the poem The Rights of Women.

== Life ==
Cobden was born Ellen Millicent Ashburner Cobden in 1848 in Manchester, Lancashire, England. Her parents were Richard Cobden, radical MP and leader of the Anti-Corn Law League, and his Welsh wife Catherine Anne Williams. She had four sisters and a brother and was the youngest child of the family. All the children were all encouraged to develop a strong civic consciousness from a young age.

Cobden was formally educated at Miss Jeffreson's School in Brighton, England. In 1856, when she was seven years old, her 15-year-old brother Richard Cobden died of scarlet fever whilst studying at a German boarding school.

After the death of her father in 1865, Cobden was granted an annuity of £250 a year from the Cobden Tribute Fund. This had been established by family friends as an investment trust for Cobden's widow and her daughters and had raised over £25,000. Her mother died in April 1877.

As a young woman Cobden could afford to travel, and visited Algeria in North Africa during the 1870s.

Cobden married the painter Walter Richard Sickert (1860–1942) in 1885 at the Marylebone Registry Office. She was 11 years his senior. They spent their honeymoon in Dieppe, France. Her husband commissioned his friend and artist James McNeill Whistler to paint two portraits of her around the time of the marriage, titled Arrangement in Violet and Pink: Mrs Walter Sickert and Green and Violet: Portrait of Mrs Walter Sickert. She was also painted by Jacques Emile Blanche.

Cobden financially supported her husband's own art career, until she discovered in 1896 that he had been unfaithful to her for the duration of their marriage. They lived mostly apart during the 1890s, with Cobden spending her time abroad in Venice, Italy, and Fluellen, Switzerland. The couple divorced in February 1900. Their divorce was the first case of "constructive desertion" to be taken to court, so setting a precedent in divorce law.

She changed her name by deed poll from Ellen Melicent Ashburner Cobden Sickert to Ellen Melicent Cobden in 1913. Cobden died of cancer a year later, in 1914.

== Politics ==
Cobden supported the Irish Home Rule movement through membership of the English Home Rule Union and letter writing campaigns to The Times. She joined the South Africa Conciliation Committee in 1900.

Cobden was also a supporter of women's suffrage. She donated funds to the Women's Social and Political Union (WSPU). In 1910, she participated, alongside her sister Anne Cobden-Sanderson, in the Women's Suffrage Procession, organised by the Women's Freedom League. When Anne stood trial and was imprisoned for two months for her suffragette activities, Ellen and another sister Jane Cobden celebrated her release over dinner at the Savoy Hotel.

== Writing ==
In 1879, she wrote the poem The Rights of Women.

Under the pseudonym Miles Amber she published Winstons – A story in three parts in 1902. The novel was about the tragic experiences in society of two daughters of a Sussex farmer. The novel was influenced by her political views and the views of her wider family. It was dedicated to her sister Jane.

Under her own name she published the semi-autobiographical work Sylvia Saxon – Episodes in a Life in 1914. The book centred around a spoilt heiress struggling with marital difficulties and social questions and included a fictional depiction of the Cobden family home of Dunford House, near Heyshott, West Sussex. The Spectator reviewed the book, stating that "the writer's gifts of intuition and of observation are remarkable".
