= Thomas Marsland =

British Conservative and Tory politician

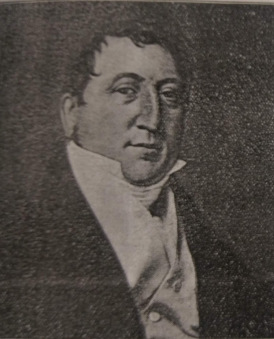

Member of Parliament for Stockport
- In office 15 December 1832 – 30 June 1841 Serving with Henry Marsland (1835–1841); John Horatio Lloyd (1832–1835)
- Preceded by: New constituency
- Succeeded by: Richard Cobden; Henry Marsland

Personal details
- Born: 13 September 1777
- Died: 18 November 1854 (aged 77)
- Party: Conservative/Tory

Thomas Marsland (13 September 1777 – 18 November 1854) was a British Conservative and Tory politician.

Marsland was elected Tory Member of Parliament for Stockport at the 1832 general election and, becoming a Conservative in 1834, held the seat until 1841 when he was defeated. While he attempted to regain the seat at a by-election in 1847, he was unsuccessful.

Parliament of the United Kingdom
New constituency	Member of Parliament for Stockport; 1832–1841; With: Henry Marsland (1835–1841); John Horatio Lloyd (1832–1835)	Succeeded by Richard Cobden; Henry Marsland
