= John Horatio Lloyd =

English barrister and Liberal MP

- Born: 1 September 1798
- Died: 17 July 1884 (aged 85)
- Occupation: Barrister

John Horatio Lloyd (1 September 1798 – 17 July 1884) was an English barrister and Liberal MP for Stockport from 1832 to 1835.

== Background ==
He was born the son of John Lloyd, attorney and Town Clerk of Stockport, and Mary Lott.

He was educated at Stockport Grammar School and Queen's College, Oxford. In 1823 he was made a fellow of both Queen's College, Oxford and Brasenose College, Oxford.

He went up to London and was called to the Bar at the Inner Temple in 1826. In conjunction with William Newland Welsby he published in three parts "Reports of Mercantile Cases in the Courts of Common Law" in 1829 and 1830.

In 1832 he entered Parliament as Liberal MP for Stockport, following the passing of the Reform Bill, and held the seat until 1835.

After a period in Athens working for the Ionian Bank, he returned to England and his legal practice became very successful, particularly in regards to investments in railways, for which is developed the Lloyd's Bond. He became one of the directors of the London Pneumatic Despatch Company.

In his will, he bequeathed the sum of £92,000, (equivalent to £9,884,300 in 2025).

== Family ==
He married Caroline Holland Watson, daughter of Major Holland Watson of the Stockport Volunteer Corps, on 7 September 1826.

They had the following children

- Horatio Watson Lloyd (1827–1828)
- Horace Lloyd (1828–1874), who married Adelaide Atkinson and whose daughter Constance Lloyd married Oscar Wilde.
- Frederick Watson Lloyd (1830–1862)
- Emily Francis Lloyd (1831–1892)
- Caroline Lloyd (1833–1893)
- Louisa Mary Lloyd (1835–1908)
- Sophia Holland Lloyd (1837–1838)
- Edward Lloyd (1840–1845)

Parliament of the United Kingdom
New constituency	Member of Parliament for Stockport; 1832 – 1835; With: Thomas Marsland to 1841	Succeeded by Henry Marsland; Thomas Marsland
