= Henry Marsland =

British Radical politician

Member of Parliament for Stockport
- In office 15 January 1835 – 31 July 1847 Serving with Richard Cobden (1841–1847); Thomas Marsland (1835–1841)
- Preceded by: Thomas Marsland; John Horatio Lloyd
- Succeeded by: Richard Cobden; James Heald

Personal details
- Born: 1798
- Died: 26 November 1864 (aged 63–64)
- Party: Radical

Henry Marsland (1798 – 26 November 1864) was a British Radical politician.

Marsland was elected Radical Member of Parliament for Stockport at the 1835 general election and held the seat until 1847 when he did not seek re-election.

Parliament of the United Kingdom
Preceded by Thomas Marsland; John Horatio Lloyd	Member of Parliament for Stockport; 1835–1847; With: Richard Cobden (1841–1847); Thomas Marsland (1835–1841)	Succeeded by Richard Cobden; James Heald
