= Anne Cobden-Sanderson =

English socialist and suffragette (1853–1926)

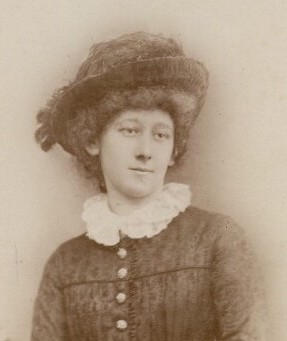
- Anne Cobden-Sanderson in 1881
- Born: Julia Sarah Anne Cobden; 26 March 1853; London, England
- Died: 2 November 1926 (aged 73); Hammersmith, London, England
- Spouse: T. J. Cobden-Sanderson (m. 1882; died 1922)
- Parent: Richard Cobden
- Relatives: Ellen Melicent Cobden (sister), Jane Cobden (sister)

Julia Sarah Anne Cobden-Sanderson (née Cobden; 26 March 1853 – 2 November 1926) was an English socialist, suffragette and vegetarian.

== Life ==
Cobden was born at Westbourne Terrace in London in 1853. Her parents were Richard Cobden, radical MP and leader of the Anti-Corn Law League, and his Welsh wife Catherine Anne Williams. She had four sisters and a brother. All the children were all encouraged to develop a strong civic consciousness from a young age.

After her father died in 1865, Cobden was educated at schools in Britain and Germany. Her mother died in April 1877. She lived for a time at the home of George MacDonald and later at the home of William Morris. On 5 August 1882 she married the out-of-work barrister T. J. Sanderson, and they both took the surname Cobden-Sanderson.

Anne was concerned that her husband was thinking rather than doing, and she suggested that he take up book-binding. They were already in the social circle of William Morris and Jane Burden, and it was her husband who first coined the term "Arts and Crafts". Morris had already established the Kelmscott Press when Anne's husband and a photographer named Emery Walker agreed to found a press. The press was named the Doves Press and the profits were to be shared, but it was Anne who put up the capital of £1600 to start the business. Crucially, it was agreed that should the partnership end, Walker would be entitled to a copy of the typeface that they proposed to create. The Doves Type was created and Anne's single-minded husband used strict "Arts and Crafts" principles to create the Doves Bible, which was sold at a £500 profit. By 1906 the partners had fallen out over Walker's lack of interest and her husband's obsessive interest. Despite the agreement, Anne's husband did not deliver a copy of the typeface and instead arranged for every copy of the design to be dropped into the River Thames.

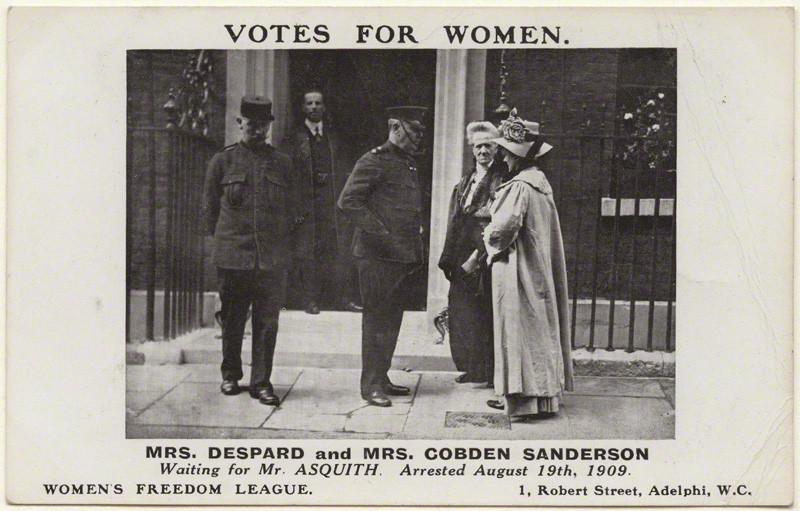
Cobden-Sanderson at 10 Downing Street shortly before her 1909 arrest.

Cobden-Sanderson worked for the Independent Labour Party and was arrested as a suffragette in October 1906 (along with Minnie Baldock and Nellie Martel). George Bernard Shaw wrote a letter of protest in September and she was released the following month. She was a founding member of the Women's Freedom League and also helped form the Women's Tax Resistance League in 1909.

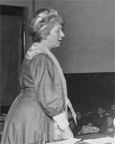
Anne Cobden-Sanderson in USA ,1907

In 1907, she was invited to speak in the United States by Harriot Stanton Blatch and the Equality League of Self-Supporting Women to tell American suffragettes about the protest methods used in Britain and her experiences as an activist in the women's suffrage movement. She addressed the first meeting of the Bryn Mawr College Suffrage Society using the title "Why I went to Prison". She went to America with her husband and, while she spoke to women's rights groups, he was welcomed as an "Arts and Crafts" celebrity.

In 1910, Cobden-Sanderson participated, alongside her sister Ellen Melicent Cobden, in the Women's Suffrage Procession. Cobden-Sanderson was also active in other causes, such as campaigning for meals and medical inspection for poor children and working as a Poor Law Guardian. She was briefly involved with the Society for Physical Research (SPR).

In 1922, her husband died. After his death, Cobden-Sanderson paid a large sum to settle a dispute with Emery Walker. This money was to compensate him for the loss of the typeface that her husband had thrown into the Thames when his partnership with Walker ended.

Cobden-Sanderson died in Hammersmith in 1926.

Two years after her death, the Representation of the People (Equal Franchise) Act was passed into law. A celebratory breakfast was held at Hotel Cecil in London and the Manchester Guardian reported that she gave a speech in tribute to four prominent women's suffrage activists who died before the vote was finally won on equal terms: Emmeline Pankhurst, Emily Davidson, Constance Lytton and Cobden-Sanderson.

== Vegetarianism ==
Cobden-Sanderson studied theosophy and vegetarianism. She became a vegetarian at age 20 and authored How I Became a Vegetarian, in 1908.

In 1908, she formed the New Food Reform Movement with Sarah Grand and vegetarians Charlotte Despard, Beatrice Webb and Seebohm Rowntree. The movement aimed to enlighten public opinion about healthy dieting. Cobden-Sanderson opposed the rich meat diet of the period, arguing it was harmful to health and bad for digestion.

== Diary ==
The papers of 20th century Holloway governor Joanna Kelley are at the LSE library and they contain Sanderson's (confiscated) prison diary.

== Legacy ==
Her great-great-grandson, Nick Cobden-Wright started a campaign to save her former home, Dunford House, Midhurst (also home to her father Richard Cobden, the radical and Liberal MP) from sale in 2019 by the current owners, YMCA. It contained her banner 'No Vote No Tax' which she had held at the Downing Street protest. His Cobden Foundation campaign was backed by Emmeline Pankhurst's great-grand-daughter, Helen Pankhurst, CBE among others.
