= Horace Lloyd =

English barrister

- Born: August 1828
- Died: 30 March 1874 (aged 45)
- Occupation: Barrister
- Spouse: Adelaide Barbara Atkinson (m. 1855)
- Children: 2

Horace Lloyd QC (August 1828 – 30 March 1874) was an English barrister.

== Background ==
He was the son of John Horatio Lloyd and Caroline Watson.

He was educated at University College, London, and Gonville and Caius College, Cambridge. He was called to the bar in the Middle Temple in 1852. He was appointed Queen's Counsel on 21 February 1868.

In 1873 Lloyd attracted unwanted attention when he was found guilty of an assault on John Henry Champion Coles in Cookham, Berkshire.

He died on 30 March 1874.

== Family ==
He married Adelaide Barbara Atkinson, daughter of John Atkinson, in St Peter’s Church, Dublin on 28 August 1855, and they had two children:

- Otho Holland Lloyd (1856 - 1943)
- Constance Mary Lloyd (1859 - 1898) who married Oscar Wilde

After the death of her husband Adelaide Lloyd (Atkinson) began to abuse her daughter, who at the time of Horace’s death was only sixteen years of age. Otho, Constance’s brother remembered the suffering his sister faced.

It ranged from ‘perpetual snubbing in private and public sarcasm, rudeness and savage scoldings’ to physical violence. This included, ‘threatening with the fire-irons or having one’s head thumped against the wall’. Inevitably, Constance could not have gone through this ‘without some mark on the character being left’, Otho later recalled.
