= Statue of Richard Cobden =

Statue in London, England

Coordinates: 51.5348°N 0.1388°W

Richard Cobden
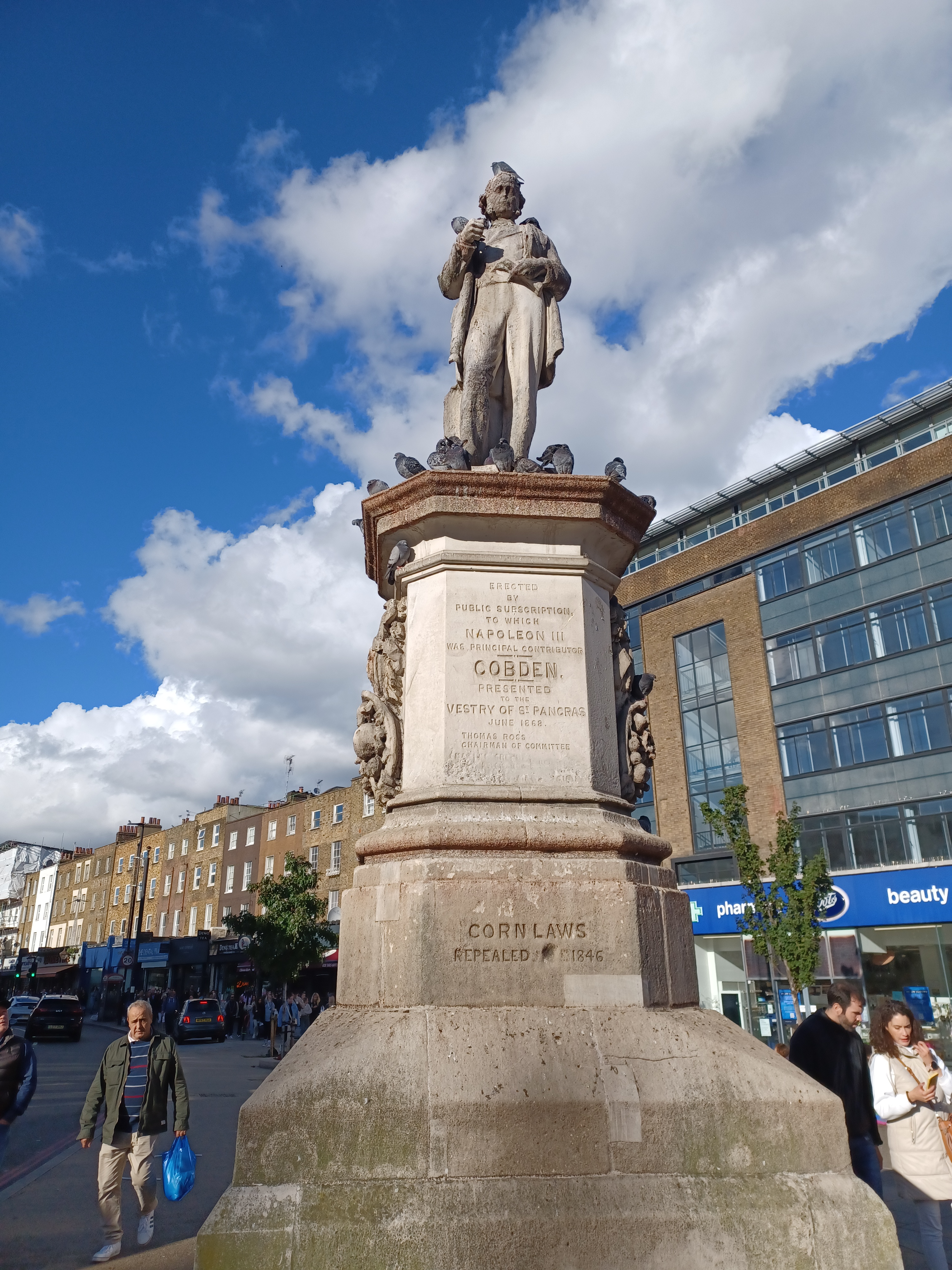
- Artist: Wills Brothers
- Completion date: 1868
- Subject: Richard Cobden
- Location: London

Listed Building – Grade II
- Official name: Statue of Richard Cobden
- Designated: 14 May 1974
- Reference no.: 1272429

The statue of Richard Cobden is a Grade II listed statue on Camden High Street near Mornington Crescent tube station.

Richard Cobden was a politician who campaigned against the Corn Laws; his Corn Law League used revolutionary tactics of targeting the electorate for a particular cause in contrast to the looser coalitions of the Tories and Whigs.

Cobden does not appear to have had any formal connection to Camden Town, yet it was there that a small group of his admirers formed a committee to raise funds for the statue. Napoleon III is described as the most significant contributor to the fund on the statue, probably as a result of Cobden's internationalist stance, although there is limited evidence for this claim. With capital being limited, a concert was held at the Agricultural Hall in Islington in a last-minute attempt to raise funds.

The statue is of Sicilian marble and was designed by the Wills Brothers. Cobden's widow would attempt to aid in its design by posing in her husband's most characteristic stance. It was unveiled in 1868. It has been claimed to be among the cheapest and worst statues in London.
