= T. J. Cobden-Sanderson =

English artist and bookbinder (1840–1922)

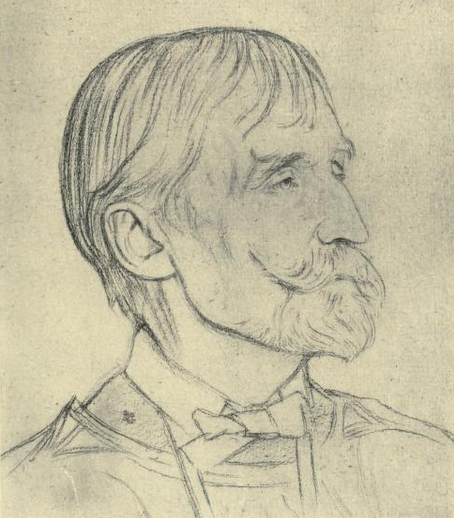
- Portrait of Cobden-Sanderson by William Rothenstein
- Born: Thomas James Sanderson; 2 December 1840; Alnwick, Northumberland, England
- Died: 7 September 1922 (aged 81); London, England
- Occupations: artist, bookbinder
- Known for: Doves Type
- Spouse: Anne Cobden-Sanderson (m. 1882)

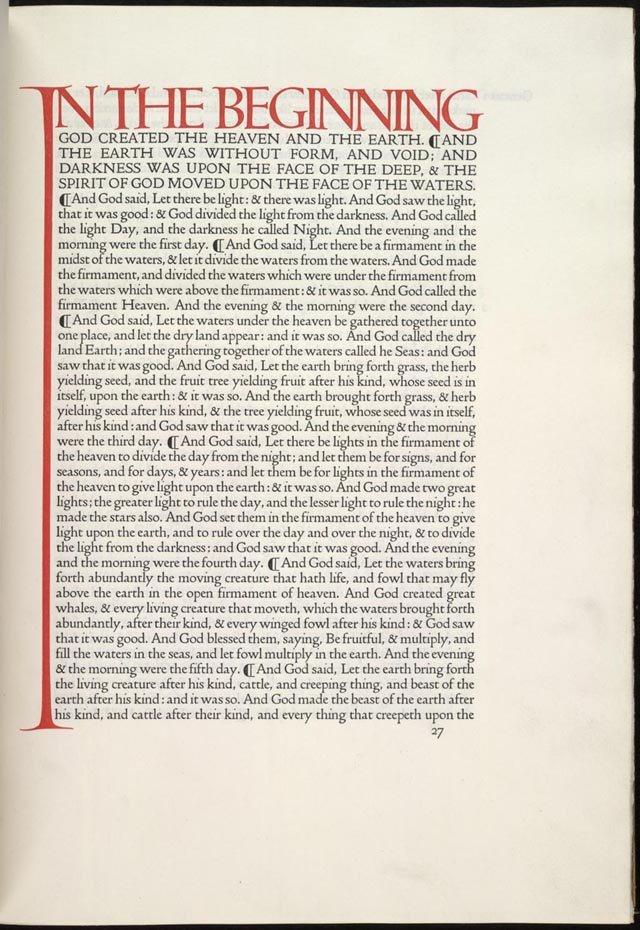
Page from the Doves Bible by Cobden Sanderson

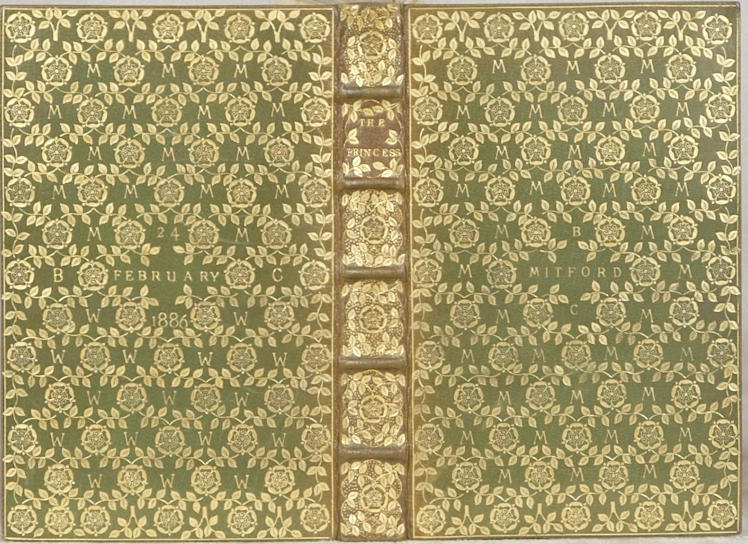
A book binding by Cobden-Sanderson

Thomas James Cobden-Sanderson (né Sanderson; 2 December 1840 – 7 September 1922) was an English artist and bookbinder associated with the Arts and Crafts movement.

== Life ==
Sanderson was born in Alnwick, Northumberland. His father, James, was a District Surveyor of taxes, thirteen years younger than his wife, Mary Ann (née Rutherford How). Sanderson attended a number of schools including the Royal Grammar School Worcester, a school in Hull, Pocklington Grammar School and Rochdale. before entering Owen's College (Manchester University) and then Trinity College, Cambridge to study law. He left without taking a degree, and entered Lincoln's Inn as a barrister. In 1882 he married (Julia Sarah) Anne Cobden, a socialist, and daughter of Richard Cobden, and they both took the surname Cobden-Sanderson.

As a friend of William Morris, Cobden-Sanderson was involved with the Arts and Crafts ideology, and during a dinner party with the Morrises he was persuaded by Morris's wife Jane Burden to take up book-binding. In about 1884 he opened a workshop, abandoning his law practice. In 1887 Cobden-Sanderson suggested a new group be named the "Arts and Crafts Exhibition Society," and in so doing gave the movement its name. His wife was concerned that his interests were too abstract and she encouraged him to become a bookbinder. In 1893 he set up the Doves Bindery in Hammersmith, London, naming it after a nearby pub, The Dove. It was his wife who took credit for keeping the business running. By 1900 he had established the Doves Press. Emery Walker became a partner in 1900 and oversaw the creation of the Doves Type used for all of their books. They produced a number of letterpress books, including a five-volume Doves Bible.

By 1909 Cobden-Sanderson and his partner Emery Walker were at the height of a protracted and bitter dispute involving the rights to the Doves Type in the dissolution of their partnership. As part of the partnership dissolution agreement, all rights to the Doves Type were to pass to Emery Walker upon the death of Cobden-Sanderson. Yet, when the press closed in 1916 Cobden-Sanderson threw the type along with its punches and matrices into the Thames. As there was no digitisation at the time, destroying the punches and matrices constituted destroying the typeface itself.

Until the 21st century, the Doves Typeface was thought to have been lost forever. However, a digital version of the typeface was painstakingly recreated by the designer Robert Green from 2010 to 2013. In 2015, after searching the riverbed of the Thames near Hammersmith Bridge with help from the Port of London Authority, Green managed to recover 150 pieces of the original type.

Cobden-Sanderson was a friend of John Russell, Viscount Amberley and his wife Kate, and made godfather of their son, the Nobel Prize in Literature-winning philosopher and activist Bertrand Russell; it 'had been long arranged that, boy or girl, (he) was to be godfather'. Amberley had hoped that, in the event of his death, Cobden-Sanderson and the other godfather, biologist D. A. Spalding (who had tutored the Amberleys' children and lived in the household), as staunch atheists, would shield his son from a religious upbringing; after his parents' deaths Bertrand was however taken in by his grandparents, John Russell, 1st Earl Russell (Prime Minister 1846–52, and again 1865-66) and his second wife, Frances, daughter of Gilbert Elliot, 2nd Earl of Minto, under threat of legal action. When Russell was convicted in 1918 for a public lecture against inviting the United States to participate in the First World War on the side of the United Kingdom, Cobden-Sanderson sent an encouraging letter of support ('with old and constant affection') expressing that he wished Russell's mother was alive to see her son's actions, part of what he considered 'a life fitted to the wonderful scene about (Russell)'.
