= Vlks =

- Origin: London, England
- Genres: Alternative pop
- Years active: 2012 to present
- Label: Vlksband/Believe Digital
- Members: David Goggin; Matthew Boorman; John Jennings; George Bacon; Ben Hogwood; Tom Morley
- Website: vlksband.wordpress.com

Vlks are an alternative pop band from Chatham and London, England. The group were featured as The Guardian 's 'New Band Of The Day' in April 2013, described as 'an indie chamber pop group, with a neat line in elegiac melodrama'.

== Formation ==
David Goggin and Matthew Boorman were formerly members of the Medway indie band Brigadier Ambrose until their final release in 2010. After a short hiatus, Goggin recorded some songs with long-term collaborator and producer Jim Riley (Billy Childish, Two Wounded Birds) at Ranscombe Studios in Rochester in late 2011. Ben Hogwood and George Bacon were asked to overdub cello and violin parts and Vlks was formed as a result, initially as a means to play the songs live. John Jennings joined as bass player in 2012. They made their live debut at a packed Club Fandango at the Buffalo Bar in Highbury, London in July 2012, before following up with a support slots for The Wave Pictures.

Vlks released their debut EP Vlks V on 29 April 2013. The EP features the songs "Day Of Bees", "The Richard Cobden", "Motown Funeral" and "Pilates". The Guardian described the lead track Day Of Bees as 'slow and swooning' - 'a promisingly miserabilist start'."Day of Bees" received supportive airplay from BBC Introducing and the band played their biggest show to date on 9 May, supporting Still Corners at London's XOYO.

Their second EP Vlks X was released on 23 September, supported by their first headline show in London at Sebright Arms on 26 September, which sold out. The EP features the songs "Clutter", "Stuffed Birds", "Feathers" and "Cold Trains". The lead track "Clutter" received airplay via BBC 6 Music and BBC Introducing.

== Later activity ==
With trumpet player and percussionist Tom Morley joining them in early 2014, Vlks were asked to play at the London Jazz Cafe in Camden as part of The Fly Magazine's 2014 Fly Awards in February 2014. A third single, "Good Grief", was released in April 2014, supported with airplay from BBC Introducing.

A five track EP, Vlks XIV, was released in September 2015, containing the lead single "Dogs", backed with "Make A Face", "Alligators", "MooooooooooooooN" and "To The Amusements". This was also backed by BBC 6 Music and BBC Introducing.

== Members ==
- David Goggin – guitar, drums, keyboards, vocals
- Matt Boorman – piano, organ, keyboards, backing vocals
- John Jennings – bass guitar
- George Bacon – violin
- Ben Hogwood – cello
- Tom Morley – trumpet and percussion

== Discography ==
=== EPs ===
- Vlks V (April 2013, Vlksband/Believe Digital)
- Vlks X (September 2013, Vlksband/Believe Digital)
- Vlks XIV (September 2015, Vlksband/Believe Digital)

=== Singles ===
- "Good Grief" (April 2014, Vlksband/Believe Digital)
