= Brigadier Ambrose =

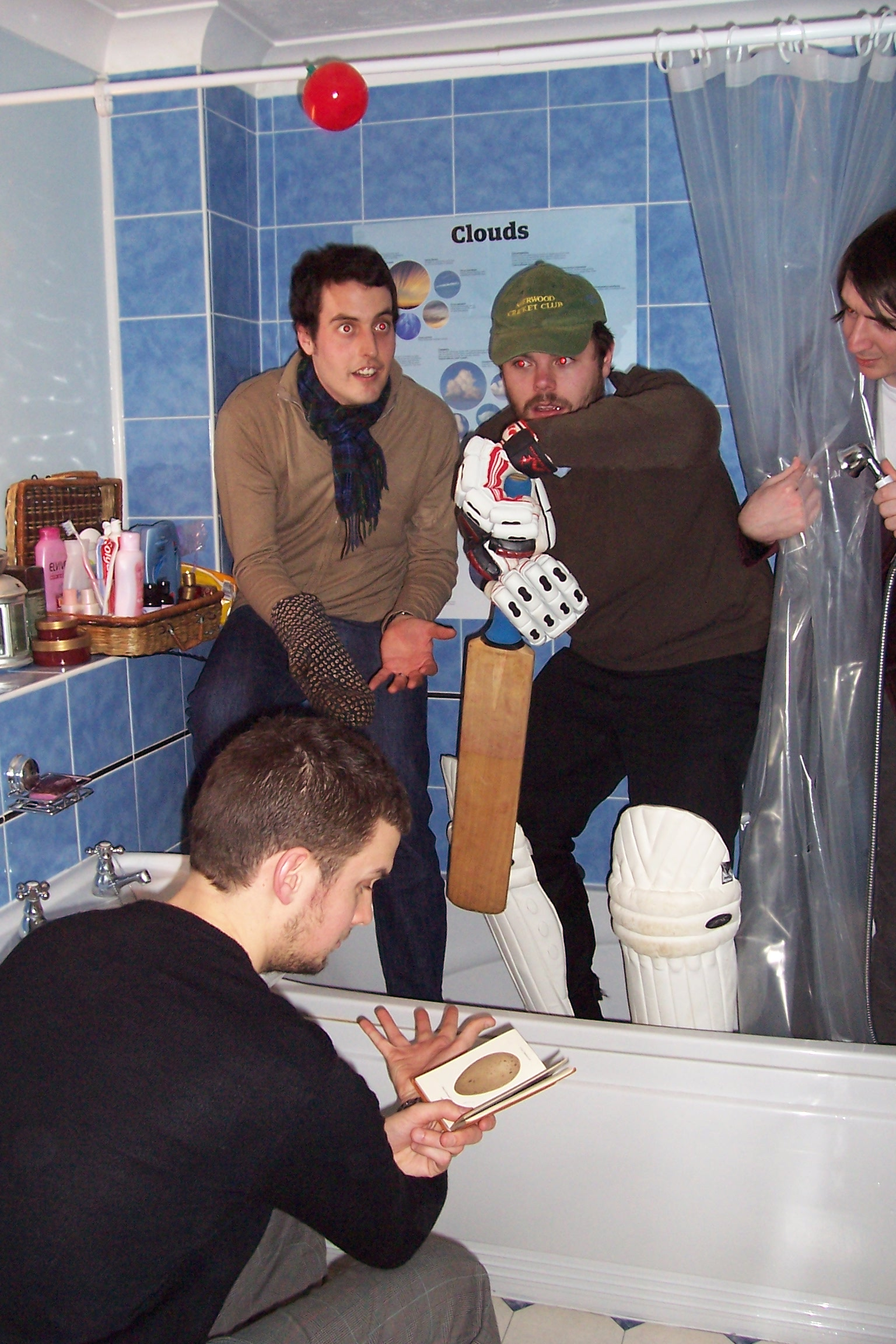
- Brigadier Ambrose playing cricket in the bathroom

Background information
- Origin: Chatham, England
- Genres: Alternative-pop, indie pop
- Years active: 2006-2010, 2015, 2023-present
- Labels: Brigadier Records
- Members: Daniel Boorman; Matthew Boorman; Karl Butler; David Goggin
- Website: www.brigadierambrose.co.uk

Brigadier Ambrose are an alternative pop band from Chatham, England. After releasing a series of digital only singles, playing various festivals, and recording sessions for BBC Radio 1 at Maida Vale, the band released their debut and only album to date Fuzzo in early 2010 through their own Brigadier Records. Fuzzo was entered into the Mercury Music Prize for 2010 but not short-listed. The band were then inactive for several years, until regrouping in early 2015, with the single "Jambon Dandy" released in June 2015.

== Formation ==
Brigadier Ambrose formed in 2006 when school friends David Goggin, Matthew Boorman and Daniel Boorman began recording songs they had written at Goggin's house in Chatham. The band was completed when Goggin met Karl Butler through a university friend, and the foursome began rehearsing and writing in a studio in Maidstone, Kent. The first year was spent playing low key gigs in the Medway Towns, until a demo of the track "Police" made it onto Stuart Maconie's Freak Zone show on BBC Radio 6 Music. More airplay followed, and the year ended with Alan McGee inviting the band to play at his Death Disco club night at Notting Hill Arts Club twice in consecutive months.

== Early career ==
The band then spent some time recording songs with Jim Riley at his Ranscombe Studios in Rochester. A song from these sessions, the Pavement influenced "How Popular You Are", started picking up radio on BBC Radio 1 in the UK and the band decided to form their own record company, Brigadier Records, to release it as a single. The song, described by the BBC as "quirky guitar pop", was supported by Phill Jupitus and Huw Stephens and backed with a song from the same Jim Riley sessions called "Back In The Old Days". The release saw the band's first artwork collaboration with Christoff Spurr, who has gone on to design all of the band's sleeves since. The single proved to be a big breakthrough for the band, who were then invited to record a Maida Vale session for BBC Radio 1. Brigadier Ambrose followed this up with a small tour of England, a highlight being the a performance on the BBC Introducing stage at the Latitude Festival (travelling to which some of the band were involved in a motorway crash with a juggernaut).

The national airplay and exposure led to some discussions with some independent record companies, but the band preferred instead to continue working by themselves by releasing their own material via Brigadier Records. They rounded off a hectic 2007 by recording and releasing another single, the chaotic "Decembered", which was nominated for single of the week on Mark Radcliffe and Stuart Maconie's BBC Radio 2 show. It was released on Brigadier Records on 10 December 2007.

2008 began with BBC Radio 1 including the then unreleased "Mrs Peel We're Needed" in their BBC Introducing Tips For 2008. The song marked a change of pace for the band following their frantic opening singles and drew comparisons with the likes of Felt and Pulp. "Mrs Peel We're Needed" was named after the tagline in the cult 1960s series The Avengers, with lyrics celebrating John Steed (played by Patrick Macnee) and Emma Peel (played by Diana Rigg). The single featured the suitably psychedelic-tinged "The Cut Of Your Jib" as a B-side. The band eventually released the single in April 2008, accompanied by a tour with BBC Introducing and the fringe event of Radio 1's Big Weekend. Brigadier Ambrose released their fourth single, "Police", on 1 September 2008, which followed on in the footsteps of the previous singles, gaining significant national airplay and positive critical acclaim.

The band then made a decision to stop performing live - their last gig of this period being at Club Fandango's 229 in London in September 2008.

== Fuzzo ==
Though originally recorded in 2008 and early 2009, the band finally released their debut album Fuzzo on CD and digital download in February 2010. No live shows were played in support of the album - the band largely recorded the album itself individually over a series of weekends with Jim Riley at Ranscombe Studios. Despite the minimal publicity, the album was received well critically. The songs "Mindreel", "Helium", "Moon & River" and "Yours, Danube Song" received airplay on BBC Radio 1, BBC Radio 2 and BBC Radio 6 Music. The album was entered into 2010's Mercury Music Prize but was not short-listed.

== Recent activity ==
Brigadier Ambrose featured in Stephen H. Morris' book Do It Yourself: a History of Music in Medway, published by Cultured Llama in April 2015.

After a recording hiatus of seven years, Brigadier Ambrose recorded two tracks with Jim Riley and Brendan Esmonde at Ranscombe Studios in March 2015. The first track, "Jambon Dandy", was released on 8 June 2015, gaining airplay on various BBC radio stations in support. Brigadier Ambrose played their first gig since 2008 at the Homespun festival in July 2015 to support the new material. The second track recorded in March 2015, "Buoyancy Aids", was released in May 2016.

The band reformed again to play a benefit concert for Ranscombe Studios in January 2023, with a variety of other Medway bands.

== Members ==
- Daniel Boorman – bass, guitar, keyboards, vocals
- Matthew Boorman – piano, organ, keyboards, vocals
- Karl Butler – drums, percussion, keyboards, vocals
- David Goggin – guitar, keyboards, vocals

== Discography ==
=== Albums ===
- Fuzzo (February 2010, Brigadier)

=== Singles ===
- "How Popular You Are" (April 2007, Brigadier)
- "Decembered" (December 2007, Brigadier)
- "Mrs Peel We're Needed" (April 2008, Brigadier)
- "Police" (September 2008, Brigadier)
- "Jambon Dandy" (June 2015, Vlksband/Brigadier)
- "Buoyancy Aids" (May 2016, Vlksband/Brigadier)
