= Westminster Abbey by-election =

Westminster Abbey by-election could refer to four by-elections held for the Parliament of the United Kingdom;

- 1921 Westminster Abbey by-election
- 1924 Westminster Abbey by-election
- 1932 Westminster Abbey by-election
- 1939 Westminster Abbey by-election
