= Herbert baronets =

Set index for Shelley baronets

There have been seven baronetcies created for persons with the surname Herbert, three in the Baronetage of England, one in the Baronetage of Ireland and three in the Baronetage of the United Kingdom. All creations are extinct.

- Herbert baronets of Red Castle (1622): see Marquess of Powis
- Herbert baronets of Derrogh (1630)
- Herbert baronets of Tintern (1660)
- Herbert baronets of Bromfield (1660)
- Herbert baronets of Llanarth (1907): see Ivor Herbert, 1st Baron Treowen (1851–1933)
- Herbert baronets of Boyton (1936): see Sir Sidney Herbert, 1st Baronet (1890–1939)
- Herbert baronets of Wilton (1937): see George Sidney Herbert (1886–1942)
