= Burgess Park =

Park in Southwark, London

Coordinates: 51°29′01″N 0°04′55″W

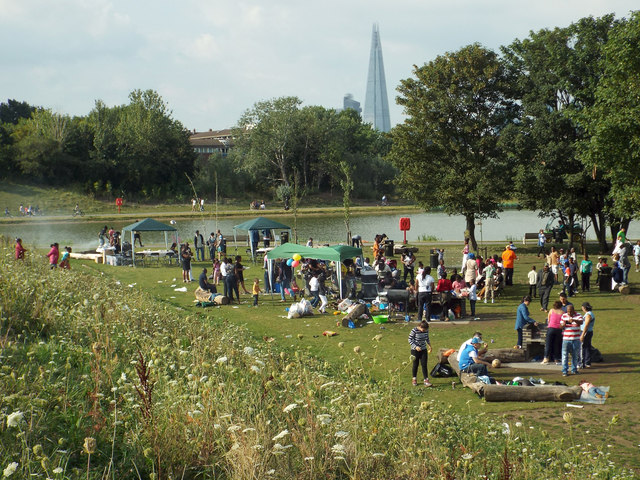
The park in 2013

Burgess Park is a public park situated in Camberwell in the London Borough of Southwark. It is close to Walworth to the north, Bermondsey to the east and Peckham to the south. At 56 hectares (140 acres), it is the largest park in the borough.

Unlike most other parks in London, Burgess Park was carved out of a highly built-up area of London. Virtually all the land now occupied by the park was previously used for housing, industry and transport infrastructure.

== Construction ==
Map of Burgess Park

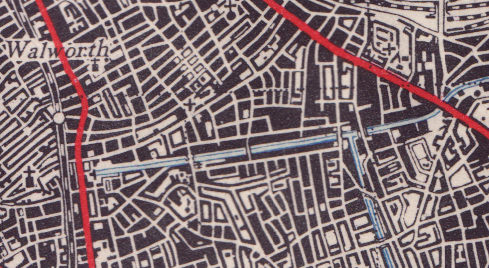
Original street layout (1945)

Houses were purchased and demolished to form the park. The idea for Burgess Park came out of the 1943 Abercrombie plan for open spaces in London, and the land has been gradually assembled and landscaped over the subsequent decades, first by the London County Council, then the Greater London Council and since the mid-1980s the London Borough of Southwark. The earliest component of what is now Burgess Park pre-dates the Abercrombie Plan: the King George's Field, opened in 1938 on the site of a former baths and swimming pool, at the Addington Square end of the park.

The early stages of the expansion of the park led to the incorporation of the North Camberwell Open Space in 1965. The open space included the churchyard of St George's, Camberwell, which had been designed by Francis Bedford in 1824. The churchyard had ceased to be used for burials in 1856. In 1886, it was acquired as a public open space by the Metropolitan Public Gardens Association and laid out as a public garden with funds provided by Viscountess Ossington. Catherine Gladstone opened the garden in 1887. After the churchyard was incorporated into the North Camberwell Open Space, it was re-landscaped in 1966. However, the church closed in 1970 and was allowed to become derelict. When the church was converted to private housing in 1994, most of the garden was allowed to become a private garden.

An important stage in the construction of the park was the closure of the Grand Surrey Canal in the early 1970s, which terminated at Addington Wharf on Camberwell Road. The canal served the Surrey Commercial Docks, and the area near Camberwell was full of 19th-century streets, houses and industrial buildings (including an R White's ginger beer factory and the Watkins Bible Factory), many of which had suffered heavy bomb damage during WWII. The stretch of canal now incorporated in the park is the site of Camberwell Wharf, which was virtually straight. Other land incorporated in the park was occupied by housing.

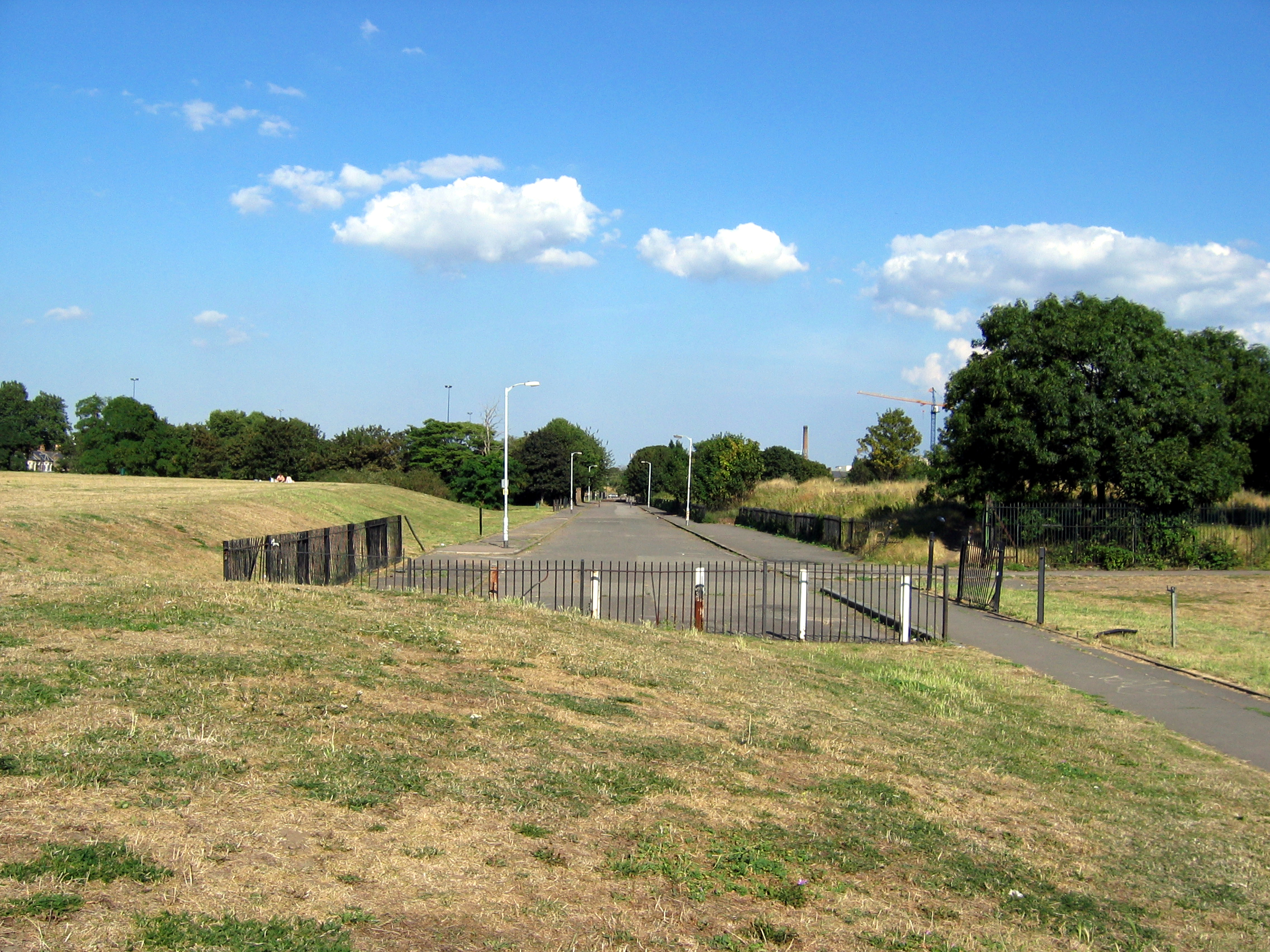
Street remnant

Named Burgess Park in 1973 (after Councillor Jessie Burgess, Camberwell's first female mayor), it is still incomplete and contains some former roads which have been stopped up but not yet grassed over. The boundaries of Burgess Park remain a matter of dispute, and because the park is unfinished, it is regularly the subject of proposals to build housing, schools or transport links of the sort that would never be contemplated in one of London's older parks of Victorian origin.

== Features ==
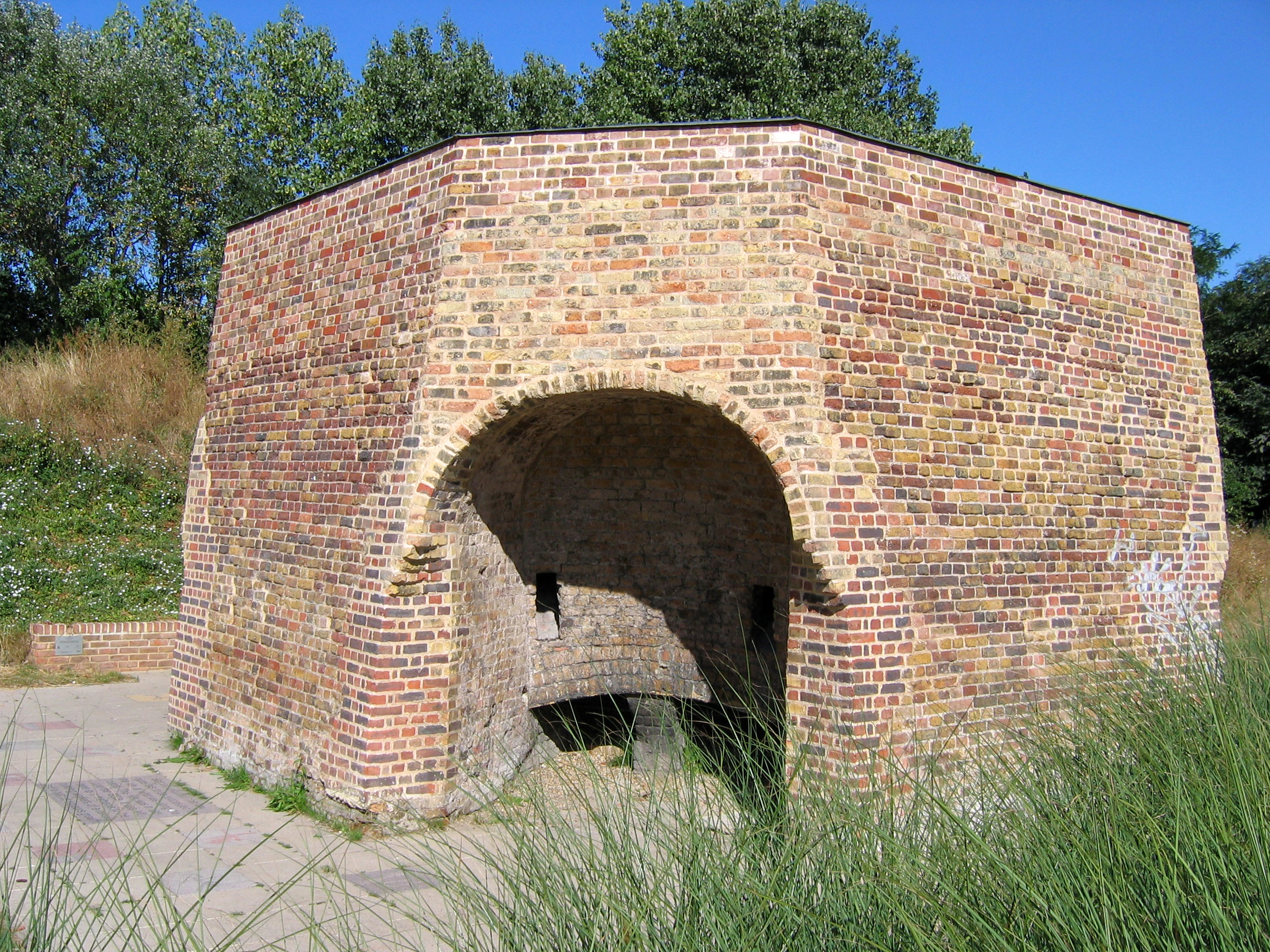
Burgess Park lime kiln

There are a large number of listed buildings in the Park, remnants of the streets which once occupied the site: an early 19th century lime kiln, the Passmore Edwards library, baths and wash houses (the piers and railings of which are separately listed) and the former almshouses in Chumleigh Gardens (which have three separate listings). The whole of the Passmore Edwards building was listed as an asset of community value in 2014. The adjacent former church of St George designed by Bedford, now converted into flats, is also listed; some parts of its former churchyard form part of the park. Its war memorial of Christ, head bowed, holding a crown of thorns, by the Danish artist Arild Rosenkrantz, is also listed.

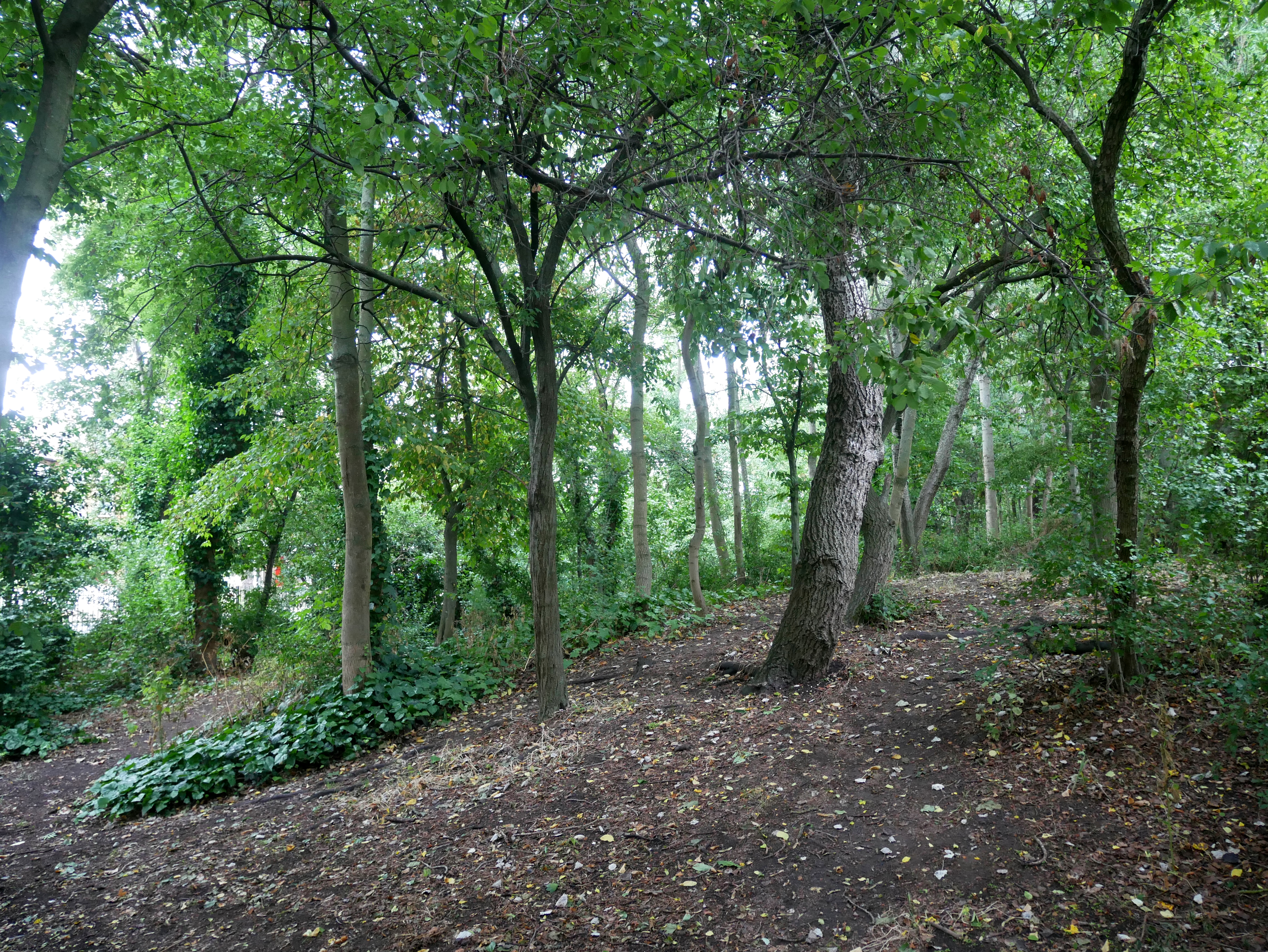
An area of woodland along the north of the park

The library, baths and wash houses are occupied by the Lynn AC boxing club and formerly by a theatre group Theatre Delicatessen. An external wall has a large mosaic of a Camberwell Beauty butterfly. The almshouses are occupied by offices and by a café. There are also several bridges, which once used to cross the canal.

Chumleigh Gardens, near the centre of the park, is a World Garden, with plants and landscaping designed to reflect the diversity of the surrounding population of this highly cosmopolitan portion of London. It was established in 1995, in the grounds of the former Female Friendly Society Asylum.

Recent additions to the park include Silent Raid, an art installation by Sally Hogarth commemorating Zeppelin raids on the local area in 1917 and a memorial to locally-born Jack Harvey VC.

There is a thriving Friends of Burgess Park who also have an online heritage project on the park, Bridge To Nowhere. In the past, the park has played host to many festivals, including, in August, the Carnaval Del Pueblo, Europe's largest celebration of Latin American culture.

== Facilities ==
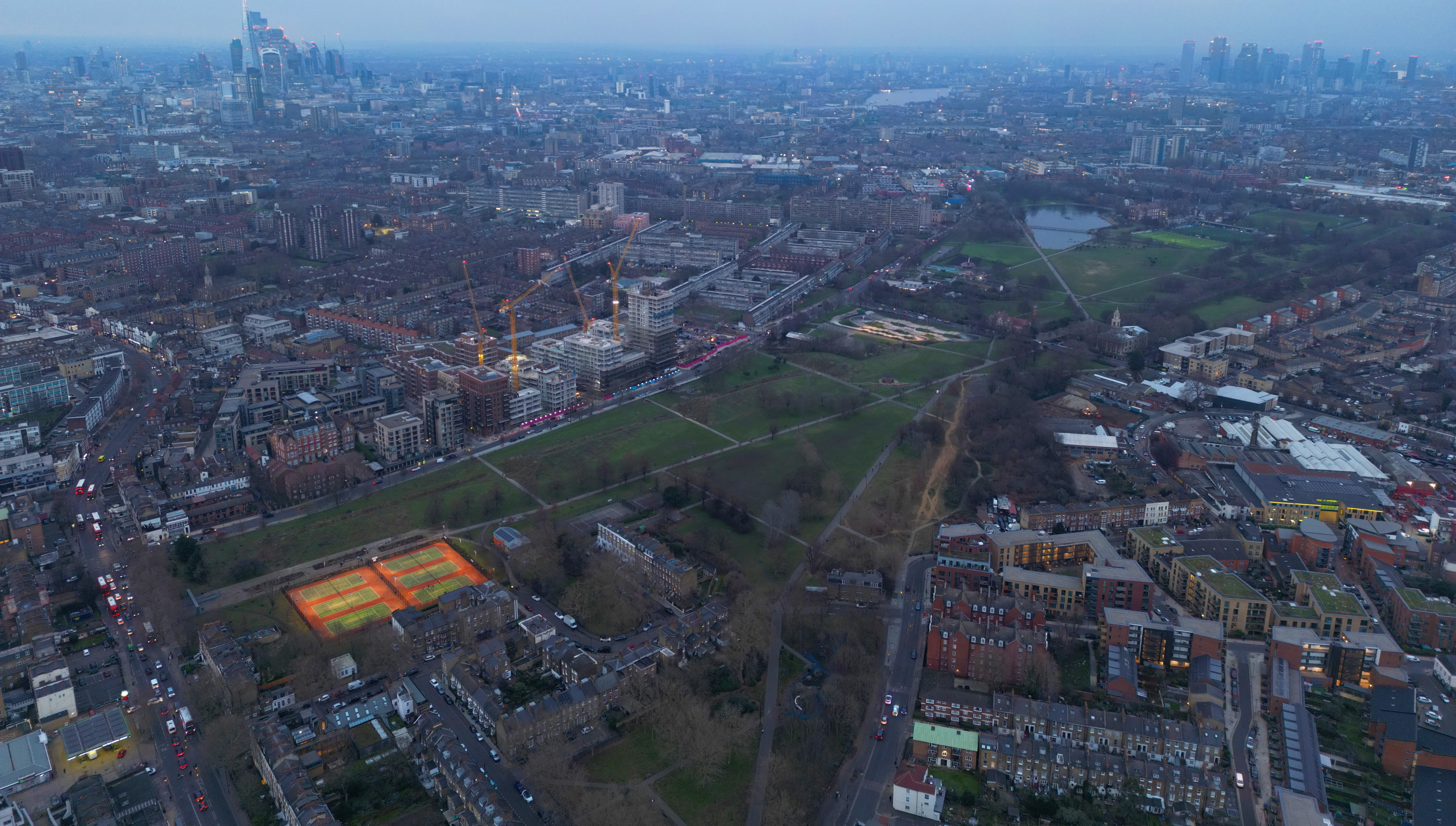
Burgess Park from above. January 2023. Visible tennis court, bmx race track, lake, football fields and other areas of Burgess Park.

In 2009, Burgess Park was one of 11 parks throughout Greater London chosen to receive money for redevelopment by a public vote. The park received a grant of £2 million from Boris Johnson, Mayor of London, as part of a London-wide competition, and the money was used to install better footpaths, additional lighting, refurbished public toilets and new play areas for children. Subsequent plans existed to top this up to £6 million by Southwark Council, to ensure the renovation of the space.

Peckham BMX Club are based in the park and has trained several world-class riders including Olympic medallist Kye Whyte.

Other facilities include tennis courts, football pitches, a rugby field (winter) / cricket oval (summer), a bbq area, a sports centre, a nursery, a community art project, Art in the Park, a local rugby club, Southwark Tigers, and two playgrounds. The park hosts a Saturday morning 5 km ParkRun.
