= Ida Swinburne =

British filmmaker and politician

Ida Swinburne in 1929

Ida Swinburne (2 December 1899 – 1984), later Steuart, was a British documentary film producer and Liberal Party politician.

== Background ==
Ida Swinburne was born in 1899 in Paddington, London, the eldest daughter of Sir James Swinburne, 9th Baronet, F.R.S., of Inverness-shire and Lilian Gilchrist Carey. She had two older half-brothers, Anthony Swinburne and Spearman Charles Swinburne and a younger sister, Marjorie Swinburne. She lived with her parents in East Surrey for 20 years. She was educated at Irwin House and the Manor House, Limpsfield. In July 1929 she married Douglas Ronald Stuart Spens Steuart. They moved to Bramham Gardens, in South West London. They divorced in 1945. She then married in July 1945, Cmdr. Daniel Harvey Rainier, DSC, RN. They lived at Strone, North Knapdale by Lochgilphead, Argyllshire. He died in March 1965 and she died in 1984.

== Political career ==
In 1928 Ida Swinburne was a Liberal London County Council candidate for Camberwell North West. She was unsuccessful. She was selected as prospective Liberal parliamentary candidate for the safe Conservative seat of East Surrey in March 1929, a constituency that the Liberals had not contested at the previous election. The General Election was almost immediately called and she had only two months to put her case across. Although she had previously lived in the constituency for 20 years, she had little opportunity to build a local profile. She highlighted her interest in industrial questions, free trade and education. She achieved a respectable second place vote, pushing the Labour candidate into third place. She was re-adopted as prospective Liberal candidate for East Surrey in 1930. She remained Liberal candidate until withdrawing in October 1931 due to the formation of the National Government. She did not stand for parliament again. She continued to be active in the Liberal Party and was a member of the national executive of the Women's Liberal Federation. She was also a member of the Eighty Club.

=== Electoral record ===
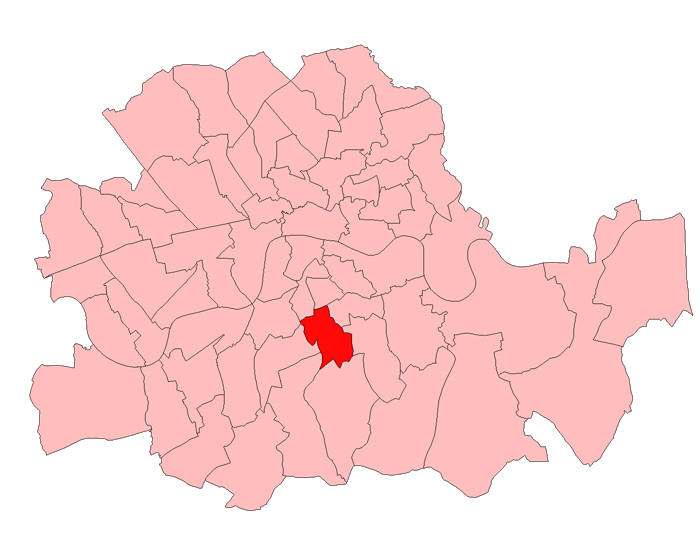
Camberwell North West

London County Council Election 1928: Camberwell North West
Party	Candidate	Votes	%	±%
Municipal Reform	William Jackson Morton	4,321	22.33	
Municipal Reform	William Harold Webbe	4,265	22.04	
Labour	George E Deighton	3,100	16.02	
Labour	Richard Sargood	3,055	15.79	
Liberal	Ida Swinburne	1,798	9.29	
Liberal	Henry James Edwards	1,747	9.03	
Independent	HJ Adams	544	2.81	
Independent	RT Bishop	522	2.70	
Majority		1,165	6.02	
Municipal Reform gain from Liberal		Swing		

General Election 1929: Surrey East
Party	Candidate	Votes	%	±%
Unionist	James Galbraith	19,578	60.9	−22.2
Liberal	Ida Swinburne	7,435	23.1	+23.1
Labour	Robert Oscar Mennell	5,152	16.0	−0.9
Majority		12,143	37.8	−28.4
Turnout				
Unionist hold		Swing	-27.6	

== Professional career ==
With her husband Ronald, Ida Steuart created Steuart Films. They produced a number of documentary films in the 1930s. She served in World War II as a 1st Officer in the Women's Royal Naval Service.
