= Westminster Abbey (UK Parliament constituency) =

Parliamentary constituency in the United Kingdom, 1918–1950

- Former borough constituency for the House of Commons

1918–1950
- Seats: One
- Created from: Strand and Westminster
- Replaced by: Cities of London and Westminster

Westminster Abbey was a constituency in the Parliament of the United Kingdom. It returned one Member of Parliament (MP) to the House of Commons by the first past the post system of election.

It was created for the 1918 general election, and included all of the former Westminster constituency, as reduced in area in 1885, apart from its Knightsbridge exclave, plus all of the former Strand constituency. It continued to exist until the 1950 general election, when it was merged with the two-seat City of London constituency to form a single-member seat named Cities of London and Westminster.

The seat was sometimes known as the Abbey Division of Westminster or simply Abbey. It was held by the Conservative Party for its entire existence.

== Boundaries ==
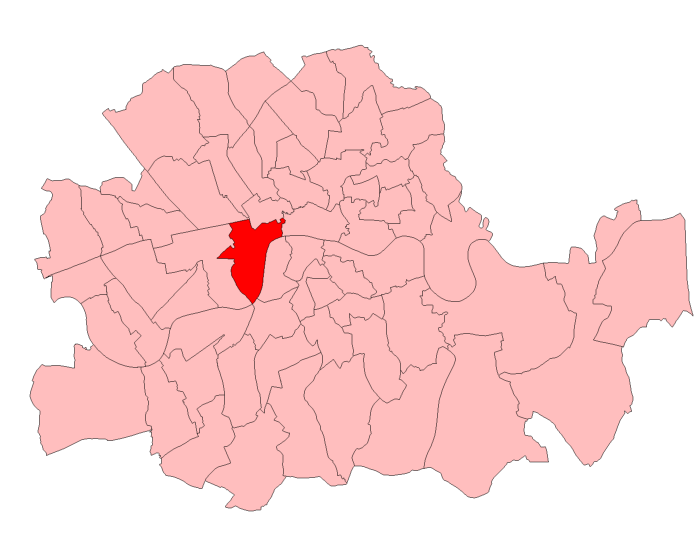
Westminster Abbey in the Parliamentary County of London 1918–1950

A map showing the wards of Westminster Metropolitan Borough as they appeared in 1916.

The City of Westminster is a district of Inner London. Its southern boundary is on the north bank of the River Thames. In 1918 it was to the west of the City of London, to the south of Holborn and St. Pancras and to the east of Kensington and Chelsea. It consisted of the eastern part of the Metropolitan Borough of Westminster, comprising the then wards of Covent Garden, Great Marlborough, Pall Mall, Regent, St. Anne, St. John, St. Margaret, Strand and part of Charing Cross.

== History ==
The constituency was created in 1918 from the former seats of Westminster & Strand. From 1918 to 1950, it returned five Conservative MPs, with Labour and the Liberals having little support in the area.

After William Burdett-Coutts, the first MP for the seat, died in 1921 there was a by-election where all three candidates claimed to be anti-waste. At the time the Anti-Waste League was active. It was formed to advance the political ambitions of the newspaper owner Lord Rothermere. The objects of the League were to insist upon measures being taken to restore the country to solvency, urge a wholesale reduction of expenditure, fight the battle of local rates and oppose sham Anti-Waste candidates. The Conservative candidate John Nicholson won the election, but the Anti-Waste League (whose candidate later became a Conservative MP) polled respectably and the Liberal candidate (a former MP) came third.

After Nicholson's death in 1924 a further by-election took place. The new Conservative candidate Otho Nicholson was challenged by the prominent politician Winston Churchill as a Constitutionalist, the formidable Labour stalwart and future MP Fenner Brockway, and a little-known Liberal. The Constitutionalist label was one used by a number of candidates, mostly ex-Liberals like Churchill, in the 1920s. The Constitutionalists did not function as a party and most of them ended up joining the Liberal or Conservative Parties. Nicholson beat Churchill with a very small majority of 43.

By the 1945 general election, the electorate of the area had dropped by almost half since the pre-war by-election. Labour almost equalled the 27% vote Brockway had received in 1924. The Independent Progressive candidate of 1939 reappeared as a Communist candidate and received 17.6% of the vote. The Conservatives still had an absolute majority of the vote. For the 1950 general election, the seat became the central part of the new constituency of Cities of London and Westminster.

== Members of Parliament ==
Election	Member	Party
1918	William Burdett-Coutts	Conservative
1921 by-election	John Nicholson	Conservative
1924 by-election	Otho Nicholson	Conservative
1932 by-election	Sir Sidney Herbert	Conservative
1939 by-election	Harold Webbe	Conservative

== Elections ==
=== 1910s ===
General election 1918: Westminster Abbey
Party		Candidate	Votes	%
C	Unionist	William Burdett-Coutts	Unopposed	
	Unionist win (new seat)			
C indicates candidate endorsed by the coalition government.

=== 1920s ===
1921 Westminster Abbey by-election
Party	Candidate	Votes	%	±%
Unionist	John Nicholson	6,204	43.6	N/A
Anti-Waste League	Reginald Applin	5,874	34.9	New
Liberal	Arnold Lupton	3,053	21.5	New
Majority		1,234	8.7	N/A
Turnout		15,131	38.5	N/A
Unionist hold		Swing	N/A	

S. Drury-Lowe

General election 1922: Westminster Abbey
Party	Candidate	Votes	%	±%
Unionist	John Nicholson	13,620	75.6	N/A
Labour	Joseph George Butler	2,454	13.6	New
Independent	Sidney Robert Drury-Lowe	1,950	10.8	New
Majority		11,166	62.0	N/A
Turnout		18,024	49.0	N/A
Unionist hold		Swing	N/A	

General election 1923: Westminster Abbey
Party	Candidate	Votes	%	±%
Unionist	John Nicholson	Unopposed		
Unionist hold				

1924 Westminster Abbey by-election
Party	Candidate	Votes	%	±%
Conservative	Otho Nicholson	8,187	35.9	N/A
Constitutionalist	Winston Churchill	8,144	35.8	New
Labour	Fenner Brockway	6,156	27.0	New
Liberal	James Scott Duckers	291	1.3	New
Majority		43	0.1	N/A
Turnout		22,778	61.6	N/A
Conservative hold		Swing	N/A	

General election 1924: Westminster Abbey
Party	Candidate	Votes	%	±%
Conservative	Otho Nicholson	17,915	80.6	N/A
Labour	Arthur Woolf	4,308	19.4	N/A
Majority		13,607	61.2	N/A
Turnout		22,223	58.4	N/A
Conservative hold		Swing		

General election 1929: Westminster Abbey
Party	Candidate	Votes	%	±%
Unionist	Otho Nicholson	18,195	74.0	−6.6
Labour	James H MacDonnell	6,406	26.0	+6.6
Majority		11,789	48.0	−13.2
Turnout		24,601	50.7	−7.7
Unionist hold		Swing	−6.6	

=== 1930s ===
General election 1931: Westminster Abbey
Party	Candidate	Votes	%	±%
Conservative	Otho Nicholson	Unopposed		
Conservative hold				

1932 Westminster Abbey by-election
Party	Candidate	Votes	%	±%
Conservative	Sidney Herbert	Unopposed		
Conservative hold				

General election 1935: Westminster Abbey
Party	Candidate	Votes	%	±%
Conservative	Sidney Herbert	18,117	77.5	N/A
Labour	William Smith Kennedy	5,255	22.5	New
Majority		12,862	55.0	N/A
Turnout		23,372	49.2	N/A
Conservative hold		Swing	N/A	

1939 Westminster Abbey by-election
Party	Candidate	Votes	%	±%
Conservative	Harold Webbe	9,678	67.4	−10.1
Independent Progressive	G. Billy Carritt	4,674	32.6	New
Majority		5,004	34.8	−20.2
Turnout		14,352	30.3	−18.9
Conservative hold		Swing		

=== 1940s ===
General election 1945: Westminster Abbey
Party	Candidate	Votes	%	±%
Conservative	Harold Webbe	9,160	54.4	−23.1
Labour	Jeremy Hutchinson	4,408	26.1	+3.6
Communist	Bill Carritt	2,964	17.6	New
Democratic	Norman Leith-Hay-Clark	326	1.9	New
Majority		4,752	28.3	−26.7
Turnout		16,858	58.5	+9.3
Conservative hold		Swing		
