= James Kaylor =

British politician

James Kaylor (1877 – 14 December 1961) was a British politician and trade unionist.

Kaylor became prominent in the Amalgamated Society of Engineers, and was elected to its executive council in 1913. He sat on various government committees during World War I. At the 1918 general election, he stood in Bristol North for the Labour Party; he took 26.5% of the vote and second place.

In 1930, Kaylor was elected to the Labour Party National Executive Committee (NEC), and in 1934 he won the Camberwell North West seat as a member of the Amalgamated Engineering Union on London County Council, which he held until the next election, 1937. In 1938, he stood down from the NEC, and instead won a seat on the General Council of the Trades Union Congress, which he retained until 1943.

During World War II, Kaylor sat on Walter Citrine's commission concerning regional production. He also served on the National Arbitration Tribunal and numerous other bodies. He subsequently retired to Sydney in Australia, where he died in 1961.
