= Camberwell North West (London County Council constituency) =

London County Council constituency

- Former constituency for the London County Council

Former constituency
- Created: 1919
- Abolished: 1949
- Member(s): 2
- Created from: Camberwell North and Dulwich
- Replaced by: Dulwich and Peckham

Camberwell North West was a constituency used for elections to the London County Council between 1919 and 1949. The seat shared boundaries with the UK Parliament constituency of the same name.

== Councillors ==
Year	Name	Party	Name	Party
1919	Seth Coward	Progressive	Henry Ernest Wood	Progressive
1922	Charles Kingston	Municipal Reform	William Jackson Morton	Municipal Reform
1925	Harold Webbe	Municipal Reform	William Jackson Morton	Municipal Reform
1934	Freda Corbet	Labour	James Kaylor	Labour
1937	Freda Corbet	Labour	Frederick George Burgess	Labour

== Election results ==
1919 London County Council election: Camberwell North West
Party	Candidate	Votes	%	±%
Progressive	Henry Ernest Wood	1,534	27.8	n/a
Progressive	Seth Coward	1,503	27.3	n/a
Municipal Reform	Rose Dunn-Gardner	1,255	22.8	n/a
Municipal Reform	J. M. Fraser	1,222	22.2	n/a
Majority		248	4.5	n/a
Progressive win				

1922 London County Council election: Camberwell North West
Party	Candidate	Votes	%	±%
Municipal Reform	Charles Kingston	4,794		
Municipal Reform	William Jackson Morton	4,551		
Labour	John George Spradbrow	2,846		
Labour	J. F. Lucas	2,520		
Progressive	Seth Coward	1,873		
Progressive	Henry Ernest Wood	1,806		
Majority				
Municipal Reform gain from Progressive		Swing		
Municipal Reform gain from Progressive		Swing		

1925 London County Council election: Camberwell North West
Party	Candidate	Votes	%	±%
Municipal Reform	William Jackson Morton	4,446		
Municipal Reform	Harold Webbe	4,309		
Labour	A. Andrews	3,464		
Labour	G. Deighton	3,369		
Progressive	Seth Coward	1,320		
Progressive	Henry Ernest Wood	1,303		
Majority				
Municipal Reform hold		Swing		
Municipal Reform hold		Swing		

1928 London County Council election: Camberwell North West
Party	Candidate	Votes	%	±%
Municipal Reform	William Jackson Morton	4,321		
Municipal Reform	Harold Webbe	4,265		
Labour	G. Deighton	3,100		
Labour	Richard Sargood	3,055		
Liberal	Ida Swinburne	1,798		
Liberal	Henry James Edwards	1,747		
Independent Labour	H. J. Adams	544		
Independent Labour	R. T. Bishop	522		
Majority				
Municipal Reform hold		Swing		
Municipal Reform hold		Swing		

1931 London County Council election: Camberwell North West
Party	Candidate	Votes	%	±%
Municipal Reform	William Jackson Morton	4,715		
Municipal Reform	Harold Webbe	4,641		
Labour	Richard Sargood	3,183		
Labour	A. C. Warwick	3,131		
Liberal	J. Ward Daw	680		
Liberal	A. J. Cook	660		
Majority				
Municipal Reform hold		Swing		
Municipal Reform hold		Swing		

1934 London County Council election: Camberwell North West
Party	Candidate	Votes	%	±%
Labour	James Kaylor	5,686		
Labour	Freda Corbet	5,677		
Municipal Reform	William Jackson Morton	4,550		
Municipal Reform	Harold Webbe	4,463		
Liberal	Henry James Edwards	1,027		
Liberal	Giles Playfair	905		
Majority				
Labour gain from Municipal Reform		Swing		
Labour gain from Municipal Reform		Swing		

1937 London County Council election: Camberwell North West
Party	Candidate	Votes	%	±%
Labour	Frederick George Burgess	6,855		
Labour	Freda Corbet	6,746		
Municipal Reform	L. Shillingford	5,247		
Municipal Reform	Christie	5,111		
Liberal	Henry James Edwards	535		
Liberal	G. H. Gladman	417		
Independent	J. J. Dewar	183		
Majority				
Labour gain from Municipal Reform		Swing		
Labour gain from Municipal Reform		Swing		

1946 London County Council election: Camberwell North West
Party	Candidate	Votes	%	±%
Labour	Freda Corbet	4,150		
Labour	Frederick George Burgess	3,290		
Conservative	H. E. Day	1,635		
Conservative	G. V. Reynolds	1,605		
Majority				
Labour hold		Swing		
Labour hold		Swing		
