= George Sidney Herbert =

English businessman

Sir George Sidney Herbert Bt
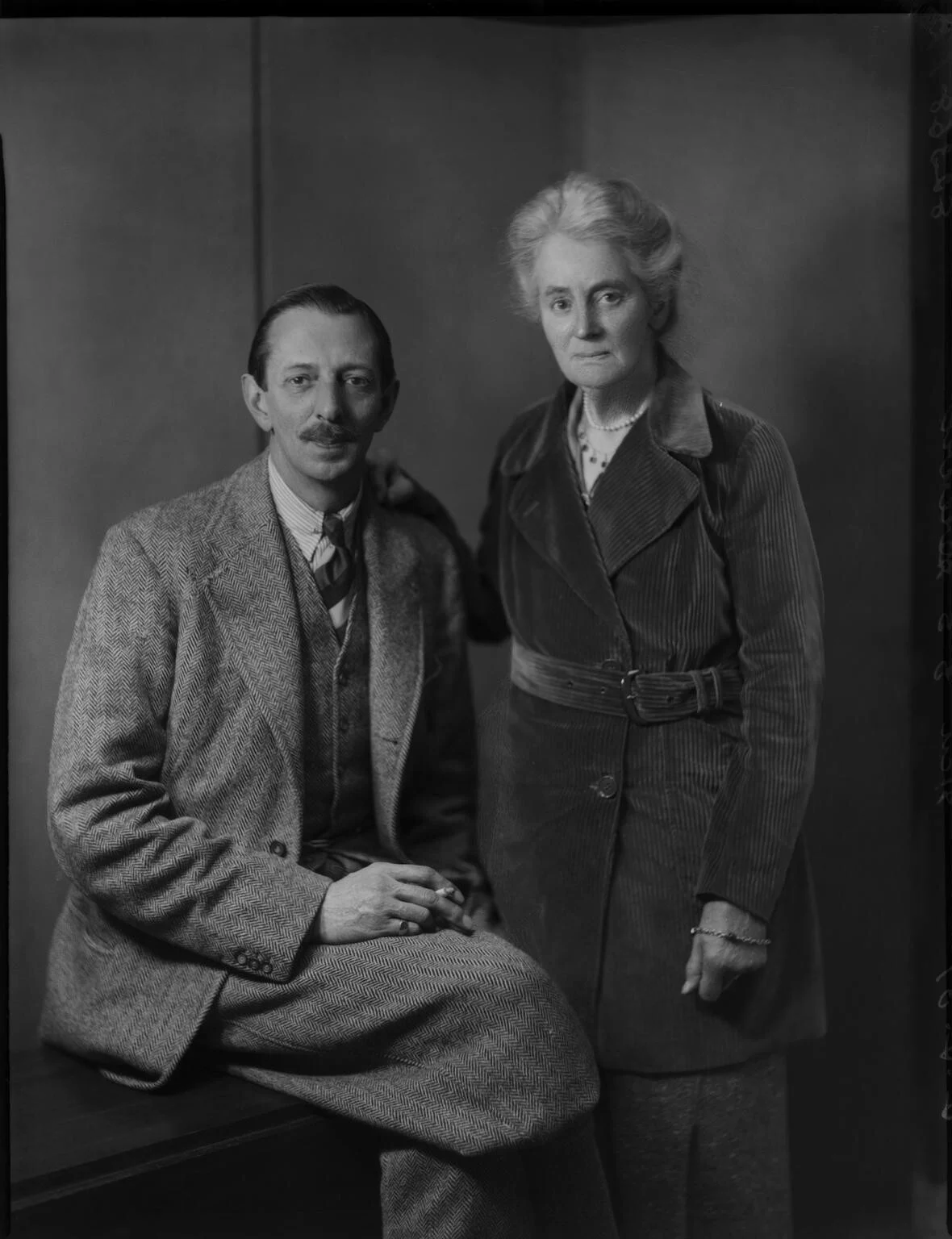
- Herbert and his mother in February 1937

Personal details
- Born: 8 October 1886
- Died: 30 January 1942 (aged 55) Bath, Somerset
- Relations: Reginald Herbert, 15th Earl of Pembroke; Sir Sidney Herbert, 1st Baronet
- Parent(s): Sidney Herbert, 14th Earl of Pembroke; Lady Beatrix Louisa Lambton
- Education: Eton College
- Alma mater: Magdalen College, Oxford

Military service
- Allegiance: United Kingdom
- Branch/service: British Army
- Years of service: 1914–1919
- Rank: Major; Honorary Colonel
- Unit: 4th Battalion; Wiltshire Regiment
- Battles/wars: First World War

Colonel the Hon. Sir George Sidney Herbert, 1st Baronet (8 October 1886 – 30 January 1942) was an English businessman and member of the Royal Household.

== Early life and education ==
George Sidney Herbert was born on 8 October 1886 to Sidney Herbert, the 14th Earl of Pembroke, and Lady Beatrix Louisa Lambton. He was the fourth of four children, and the second of two sons; his brother Reginald would take their father's titles.

As a seven-year-old boy at the end of 1893, with Parliament in the midst of the debate over the Second Home Rule Bill Herbert wrote to Prime Minister William Ewart Gladstone after the family's Christmas plans were cut short: "I am sorry we cannot go to Ireland for Christmas, as you have only given Father four days holiday. And I hope you will give him some more after this letter." Gladstone wrote back the same day, expressing his sympathy, and suggesting that "your Father could do something, if he thought it right to ask some ten or a dozen of his friends to abate a little the number of their speeches". Five years later, in 1902, Herbert was his father's page at the Coronation of Edward VII and Alexandra, walking behind his father and carrying his coronet during the king and queen's procession. He reached majority in 1907, marked by a large party thrown by his parents.

George Herbert was educated at Eton, where he was in Henry Bowlby's house; by summer 1901 he was in the Remove. He then attended Magdalen College at the University of Oxford.

== Career ==
=== Military ===
Herbert was a member of the 2nd (Eton College) Buckinghamshire Rifle Volunteer Corps as early as 1905. In 1911, he was an honorary attaché in Berne. From 1914 to 1919, he served in the First World War as part of the 4th Battalion, Wiltshire Regiment. He saw service in India during this time, although was invalided home due to fever, and did not accompany the regiment to Palestine.

By 1919, Herbert was a Major. In 1920 or 1921, he was promoted to the command of the battalion. He held the post for around eight years; upon relinquishing his command, he was named honorary colonel, a title previously held by the Jacob Pleydell-Bouverie, 6th Earl of Radnor. During the Second World War, Herbert helped organise the Home Guard in a wide swath of Wiltshire.

=== Business ===
In his business dealings, Herbert was the director of several newspaper companies, including Wessex Associated News Ltd and its subsidiary Mendip Press, Ltd.—proprietors of the Bath Weekly Chronicle and Herald—and of Western Gazette Co. Ltd. He was also a local director for Liverpool, London & Globe Insurance Co. Ltd, and of the Wilton Royal Carpet Factory. Herbert helped save the latter company from closing in 1940, when its business was threatened by the war. In 1934, Herbert was elected president of the Wiltshire Friendly Society.

=== Politics ===
In 1920 or 1924, Herbert was elected to the Central Council of the National Union of Conservative and Unionist Associations; five years later, he became of member of its executive committee, and vice-chairman. In 1931–1932 he served as chairman of the Central Council, and from 1932–1933 as chairman of the executive committee. Herbert also served as president and chairman of the National Union's Wessex Division (comprising the counties of Buckinghamshire, Berkshire, Dorset, Oxfordshire, Hampshire, the Isle of Wight, and Wiltshire), chairman of the National Union's Wessex Division (comprising the counties of Buckinghamshire, Berkshire, Dorset, Oxfordshire, Hampshire, the Isle of Wight, and Wiltshire), and of the Salisbury Conservative Association (from 1918 to 1939), and was president of the West Wiltshire Constitutional Association. In these roles he was noted by the Bath Weekly Chronicle and Herald as a "sincere and convincing speaker". Herbert was active in conservative campaigns, though declined invitations to run for office himself.

=== Public service ===
Herbert, in the words of Western Gazette, was "one of [Wiltshire's] best-known and most highly valued public men", and "interested in every event which was organised for the welfare of the district". In 1907, he was appointed a Deputy Lieutenant for Wiltshire, and in January 1915, the King named him Vice-Lieutenant, "to act for his Majesty's Lieutenant during his absence from the county, sickness or other inability to act". In this capacity Herbert performed many of the duties of the Lord Lieutenant of Wiltshire—Sir Ernest Wills, 3rd Baronet—whose ill health prevented him from performing them himself. (Note: Some duties included hosting a 1937 benefit at Knoyle House for the church, distributing prizes at the end of 1937 for Shaftesbury Grammar School, and distributing prizes at a whist drive raising funds for the Wiltshire War Comforts Fund.)

Herbert joined the Wiltshire County Council in 1919; he was also the chairman of the Standing Joint Committee, which administered the police force in the county. He variously served as a county alderman (beginning around 1934), as vice-chairman of the Finance Committee, and as a justice of the peace, sitting at Tisbury. He was a member of the Alliance Lodge of Oddfellows in Wilton, as well as the president of the Salisbury and District Gardeners' Mutual Improvement Association and the honorary treasurer of the East Knoyle Horticultural Society. Herbert was also a member of East Knoyle Church, where he frequently read the lesson, and vice-chairman of the Parochial Church Council. He likewise served as president of the East Knoyle, Semley and Sedgehill branch of the British Legion. He was a regular presence at even minor gatherings in East Knoyle.

=== Royal household ===
Herbert became part of the Royal Household in 1928, with his appointment as a Gentleman Usher to King George V; he took the place of Sir Lionel Cust, who had resigned. His appointment continued during the reigns of Edward VIII and George VI in turn; in 1936 was named an aide-de-camp to the king, and the following year a groom in waiting. As part of the 1937 New Year Honours 1937 Herbert was created a baronet, "for political and public services in Wiltshire".

== Personal life ==
Herbert lived with his mother in East Knoyle, at Knoyle House. He was a member of the Carlton Club, enjoyed gardening and shooting, and was considered an excellent shot. When around 20 years old, Nevile Wilkinson created a bookplate for him. At 6 feet 6 inches (1.98 m) in height, Herbert was noted by the Bath Weekly Chronicle and Herald for a noticeable presence. Around 1933 or 1934 he traveled to Australia to recover from ill health.

Herbert was the cousin of Sir Sidney Herbert, and served along with Vivian Smith as executor for his estate upon his 1939 death. George Herbert was himself bequeathed £40,000, along with a life interest in the Boyton Manor estate and £50,000 for its upkeep; his responsibilities as executor also included attending to a locked tin deed box, which the will requested be "destroyed unopened by cremating". Herbert was also a trustee for a young Charles Chetwynd-Talbot, the 20th Earl of Shrewsbury, upon the death of his father.

Herbert died suddenly on 30 January 1942 aged 55; he had a heart attack while en route to Bath, Somerset, for a board meeting at offices of the Bath Weekly Chronicle and Herald. He died at a nursing home in the city that his chauffeur drove him to. The day before he died, he had visited every section of the Home Guard in his area. Herbert was interred in a family burial plot at Wilton House, in a private ceremony for family officiated by Neville Lovett, Bishop of Salisbury; a public service was simultaneously held at Wilton's parish church. Herbert left an unsettled estate of £71,085 15s 2d, with net personalty £70,045 7s 10d. After £22,075 in taxes he bequeathed £500 to Salisbury Division Conservative Association, and £250 each to a butler, gardener, chauffeur, and keeper; the remaining £41,000 he left to his mother for life, and then to the family member living at Boyton. A bachelor, he left no heir to his baronetcy, which became extinct.

In 1949, an oak plaque honouring Herbert was unveiled at the headquarters of the Salisbury Divisional Association; the plaque had been planned since Herbert's retirement from the chairmanship of the association, but was delayed due to the war and Herbert's death. The following year, a lady chapel at St Mary's Church in Wilton was dedicated to Herbert and his parents. The dedication service was led by William Anderson, the Bishop of Salisbury.

== Bibliography ==
- Magnus, Philip (1954). Gladstone: A Biography. Vol. I. London: John Murray. ISBN 978-0-7195-0488-4.

Baronetage of the United Kingdom
New creation	Baronet (of Wilton); 1937–1942	Extinct
