= William Burdett-Coutts =

British politician

The Right Honourable William Burdett-Coutts
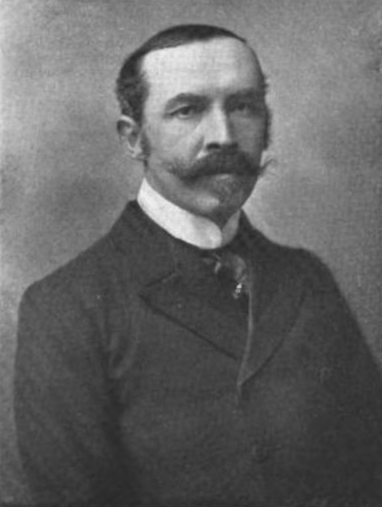
- In The Sketch, 11 July 1900

Member of Parliament for Westminster Abbey
- In office 14 December 1918 – 28 July 1921
- Preceded by: Constituency established
- Succeeded by: John Nicholson

Member of Parliament for Westminster
- In office 18 December 1885 – 14 December 1918
- Preceded by: William Henry Smith; Lord Algernon Percy
- Succeeded by: Constituency abolished

Personal details
- Born: William Lehman Ashmead-Bartlett; 20 January 1851 New Brunswick, New Jersey, United States
- Died: 28 July 1921 (aged 70) St Pancras, London, England
- Party: Conservative
- Education: Cholmeley's School
- Alma mater: Keble College, Oxford

William Lehman Ashmead Bartlett Burdett-Coutts (20 January 1851 – 28 July 1921), born William Lehman Ashmead-Bartlett, was an American-born British Conservative politician who sat in the House of Commons from 1885 to 1921.

== Life ==
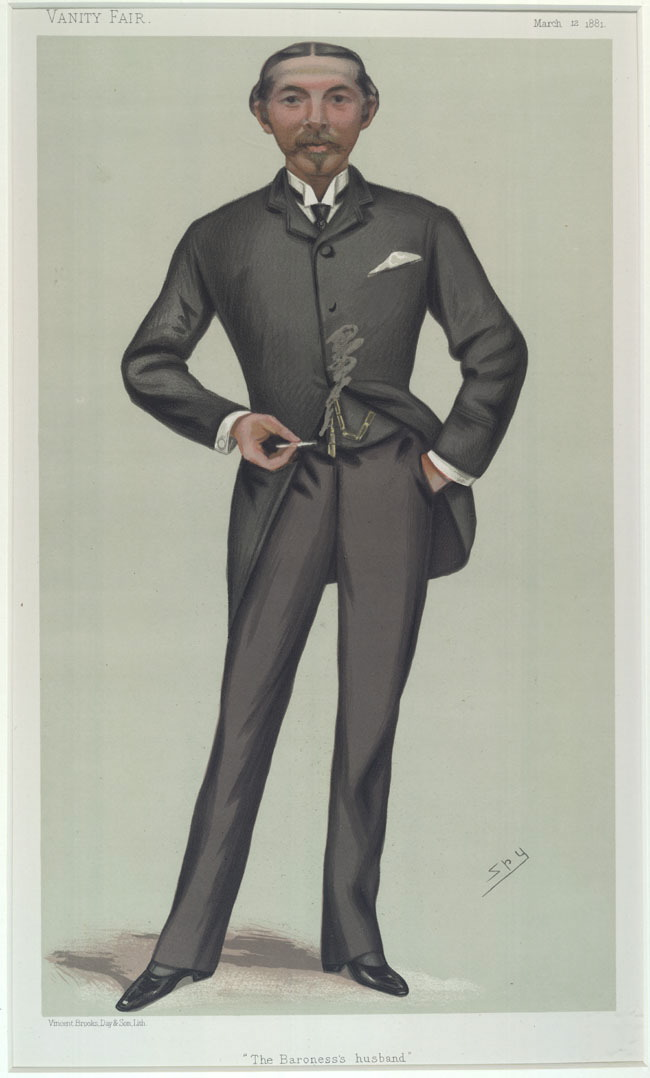
"The Baroness Husband", caricature by Spy published in Vanity Fair in 1881

Ashmead-Bartlett was born in New Brunswick, New Jersey, United States, the son of Ellis Bartlett of Plymouth, Massachusetts, United States, and his wife Sophia Ashmead, daughter of John King Ashmead of Philadelphia. All his grandparents were British subjects and he was the younger brother of Ellis Ashmead-Bartlett. After his father's death in 1852 the family moved to England, and he was educated at Torquay and at Cholmeley's School, Highgate. He entered Keble College, Oxford in 1870 with a 1st Scholarship, graduating in 1875 with a BA (MA 1876). Ashmead-Bartlett was secretary and husband to the philanthropist Baroness Burdett-Coutts.

He owned the Columbia Market (built in 1869 by Baroness Burdett-Coutts), and in connection with this, he built up a large fishing fleet in the North Sea, and a considerable trade in vegetables. However, a proposed railway to the market was never built, and competition from Billingsgate Fish Market led to the closing of the market in 1886.

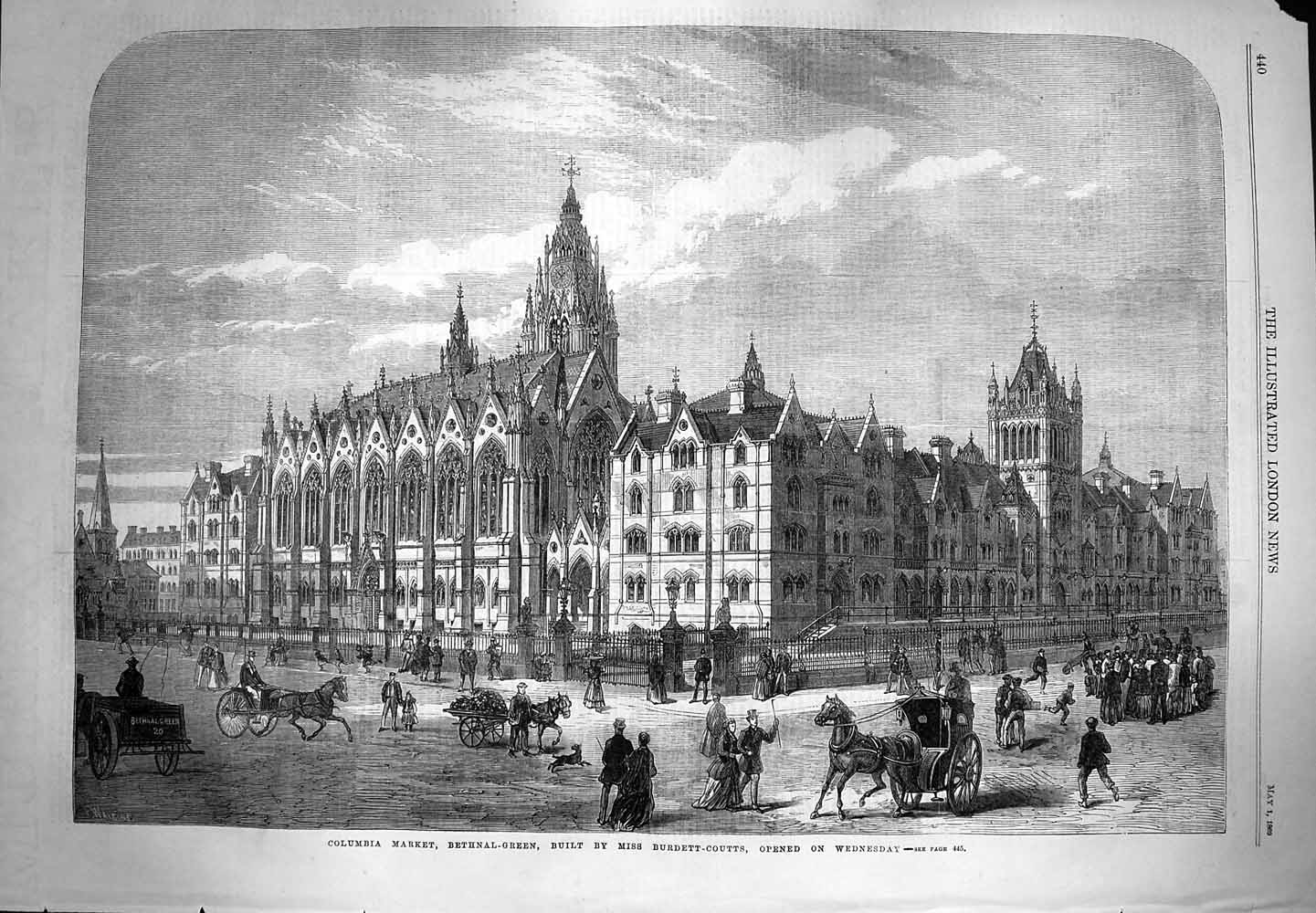
Columbia Market in the Illustrated London News, 1869

In 1877, he was Special Commissioner to Turkey (along with Sir Francis de Winton) to administer the Turkish Compassionate Fund. This had been initiated by the combined efforts of Baroness Burdett-Coutts, the Ambassador at Constantinople Sir Henry Layard, and his wife, for the relief of victims of the Russo-Turkish War (1877–78). In recognition of his work, he received the Collar and Star of the Order of the Medjidie from Sultan Abdul Hamid II. In 1879–80, he visited Ireland to assist in organising relief in the distressed districts and largely developed Baroness Burdett-Coutts' scheme for benefiting the Irish fisheries. He married the baroness, who was 37 years older than he was, on 12 February 1881 and took her surname. In 1883, he was on the Executive Committee of the International Fisheries Exhibition. He was chairman of the Highgate Committee for enlarging Hampstead Heath.

William Burdett-Coutts was first elected to Parliament in the 1885 general election for the London constituency of Westminster, which had become a one-seat constituency from a two-seat one. He remained the seat's MP until it was abolished in the 1918 general election, when he was elected for the new Westminster Abbey constituency. He was appointed to the Privy Council in the 1921 New Year's Honours List.

The Baroness died in 1906 and there were no children of the marriage. He was the executor and beneficiary of her will, and carried on much of her philanthropic work after her death.

Burdett-Coutts died aged 70, in St Pancras, London, while in office, and a by-election was held to replace him.

== Sources ==
- Obituary, The Times, 29 July 1921

Parliament of the United Kingdom
Preceded by William Henry Smith; Lord Algernon Percy	Member of Parliament for Westminster; 1885 – 1918	Constituency abolished
New constituency	Member of Parliament for Westminster Abbey; 1918 – 1921	Succeeded by John Nicholson
