= Frederick George Burgess =

British politician and trade unionist

Member of Parliament for York
- In office 30 May 1929 – 7 October 1931
- Preceded by: John Marriott
- Succeeded by: Roger Lumley

Personal details
- Born: 16 July 1871
- Died: 31 March 1951 (aged 79)
- Party: Labour

Frederick George Burgess (16 July 1871 – 31 March 1951) was a British politician and trade unionist.

Burgess worked on the railways for many years and became active in the Amalgamated Society of Railway Servants and its successor, the National Union of Railwaymen. Increasingly holding prominent offices in the union, including secretary of the Maidstone branch for seventeen years, he also served on various government committees during World War I. He also became active in the Labour Party, and stood unsuccessfully for Maidstone at the 1918 general election. Despite his lack of success, he left the railway industry the following year (refusing a post as night porter at NUR headquarters), and worked as a political agent and lecturer, also producing political cartoons and articles under the pseudonym of "Battersea Bowser".

At the 1929 general election, Burgess stood in York and won the seat. He lost it at the 1931 general election, then moved to contest Accrington in 1935, but was again unsuccessful. In 1937, he was elected to represent Camberwell North West on London County Council, serving until 1949. He also served on Camberwell Metropolitan Borough Council. He served as Camberwell's mayor from 1947 until 1949, taking over from his wife Jessie Burgess who held the role from 1945 to 1947.

Parliament of the United Kingdom
Preceded by John Marriott	Member of Parliament for York; 1929–1931	Succeeded by Roger Lumley
