= 1932 Westminster Abbey by-election =

UK parliamentary by-election

The 1932 Westminster Abbey by-election was a parliamentary by-election held on 12 July 1932 for the British House of Commons constituency of Westminster Abbey in London. The seat had become vacant when the Conservative Member of Parliament (MP) Otho Nicholson resigned from the Commons by becoming the Steward of the Manor of Northstead on 4 July 1932. He had held the seat since a 1924 by-election. The Conservative candidate, Sidney Herbert, previously MP for Scarborough and Whitby, was returned unopposed and remained the seat's MP until his death in 1939 when a further by-election was held.

== Result ==
Westminster Abbey by-election, 1932
| Party | Candidate | Votes | % | ±% |
|---|---|---|---|---|
| Conservative | Sidney Herbert | Unopposed | N/A | N/A |
| Conservative hold | | | | |
