= Jessie Burgess =

British politician

Jessie Burgess CBE

Mayor of Camberwell (United Kingdom)
- In office 1945–1947

Personal details
- Died: 1981
- Political party: Labour
- Known for: The first female mayor of Camberwell and eponym of Burgess Park

Jessie Burgess was a British politician. She was the Labour councillor for the Camberwell Metropolitan Borough Council from 1934 to 1951, the first woman to be Mayor of Camberwell. She was made an Honorary Freeman of Camberwell in 1958 and made a CBE in the 1966 Birthday Honours. Burgess Park is named after her.

== Early life and education ==
Burgess was originally from Brighton and lived in the Peabody Buildings, Camberwell Green.

== Political career ==
Burgess was the Labour councillor for the Borough of Camberwell from 1934 to 1951, and a two-term Mayor of Camberwell, first appointed in 1945-6, and again in 1946-7.

She was supported by the (then) 17 year old Pamela Phillips as Mayoress.

Pamela was a student of Mary Datchelor School, and was chosen by Burgess to represent young people who had had challenging times during the war years.

== Personal life ==
Burgess was married to Frederick George Burgess, who was mayor of Camberwell Metropolitan Borough Council from 1947 to 1949.
