= Sir Sidney Herbert, 1st Baronet =

British Conservative politician

Sir Sidney Herbert Bt

Member of Parliament for Westminster Abbey
- In office 12 July 1932 – 17 May 1939
- Preceded by: Otho Nicholson
- Succeeded by: Harold Webbe

Member of Parliament for Scarborough and Whitby
- In office 15 November 1922 – 6 May 1931
- Preceded by: Gervase Beckett
- Succeeded by: Sir Paul Latham

Personal details
- Born: 29 July 1890 Newport, Rhode Island, U.S.
- Died: 22 March 1939 (aged 48) Cannes, France
- Party: Conservative
- Parent(s): Sir Michael Herbert; Leila Belle Wilson
- Education: Eton College
- Alma mater: Balliol College, Oxford

Sir Sidney Herbert, 1st Baronet (29 July 1890 – 22 March 1939) was a British Conservative politician.

From 1919 to 1920, he was Private Secretary to Winston Churchill when he was Secretary of State for War, and served as a Member of Parliament from 1922 to 1931 and 1932 to 1939.

== Early life ==
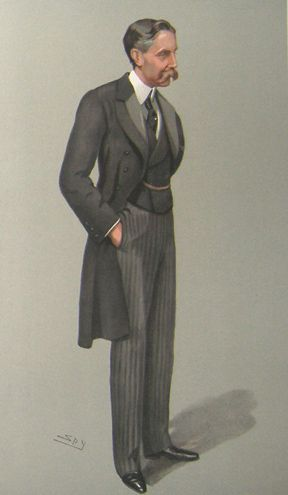
Herbert's father

Herbert was born in Newport, Rhode Island, on 29 July 1890. He was the eldest son of Sir Michael Herbert (1857–1903), the British Ambassador to the United States from 1902 to 1903, during the presidency of Theodore Roosevelt. His mother was the former Leila Belle Wilson (1864–1923), a New York heiress. He had a younger brother, Michael George Herbert, a banker with Morgan, Grenfell & Co., who died unmarried.

Herbert's paternal grandparents were the statesman Sidney Herbert, 1st Baron Herbert of Lea, and Elizabeth Herbert, Baroness Herbert of Lea, a philanthropist and Roman Catholic writer. His great-grandfather was George Augustus Herbert, 11th Earl of Pembroke and, in due course, two of Sidney's uncles (George, the 13th Earl and Sidney, the 14th Earl) succeeded to the Earldom of Pembroke.

His maternal grandparents were Richard Thornton Wilson, a banker and cotton broker from New York and Newport. His mother was one of the famous Wilson children who were known for their advantageous marriages, including his aunt Mary, who married New York landowner Ogden Goelet (they were the parents of Mary, Duchess of Roxburghe); and Grace, who married Cornelius Vanderbilt III; Orme, who married a daughter of Mrs. William Astor, "the" Mrs. Astor.

As a youth, he needed to use crutches. Herbert was educated at Eton College, in Windsor before attending Balliol College, Oxford.

== Career ==
At the outbreak of the First World War, Herbert joined the Royal Wiltshire Yeomanry, rising to the rank of Major, was a Captain of the Royal Horse Guards, and was mentioned in dispatches while serving in Belgium and France.

From 1919 to 1920, he was Private Secretary to Winston Churchill when he was Secretary of State for War, followed by Parliamentary private secretary to Edward Wood, the President of the Board of Education in 1922 and 1923.

Beginning in August 1923 until January 1924, and again from November 1924 to June 1929, he served as Private Secretary to the Secretary of State to future Prime Minister Stanley Baldwin.

=== Member of Parliament ===
Herbert was first elected to Parliament in the 1922 general election for the North Yorkshire constituency of Scarborough and Whitby. On 20 April 1931, Herbert took the Chiltern Hundreds, thus resigning from the Commons.

The following year, on 12 July 1932, Herbert was returned unopposed at a by-election in the central London constituency of Westminster Abbey, one of London's "silk stocking" constituencies. When the Commons discussed Germany's resumption of submarine building in April 1935, Sidney declared:

"Doesn't the expressed intention of the German Government to start afresh the building of submarines constitute proof--if proof is needed--that German rearmament is principally directed against this country."

In reward for "political and public services", the King's Birthday Honours in 1936 announced that he would be made a baronet. The baronetcy, of Boyton, Wiltshire was conferred on 18 July 1936.

One of his last speeches in the Commons was on 4 October 1938 in which he challenged the government on rearmament -

Even a child in my village knows that we have not got Bren guns in the numbers that there ought to be for every battalion. If we call for the men we will get them. We got them last Wednesday and Thursday when we called for them and we can get them at the beginning of any war, but what is the good of having the men if we are to send them like sheep to the slaughter without armaments. We have talked long enough about "the years which the locusts have eaten." I was led to suppose that the locusts had stopped nibbling about two years ago, but I can hear their little jowls creaking yet under the Front Bench. No answer has been given by any member of the Government, particularly the Minister for the Co-ordination of Defence, as to why these things have not been done.

— European Situation, HC Deb 04 October 1938 vol 339 cc169-308

== Personal life ==
Herbert died unmarried in Cannes, France, on 22 March 1939, at which point the baronetcy became extinct. He was buried at the St Mary and St Nicholas Churchyard in Wilton, Wiltshire. His net estate, valued at $2,839,364, was left to his two principal beneficiaries, his cousins the Hon. Sir. George Sidney Herbert and Sir Sidney Charles Herbert. After his death, a by-election was held to replace him.

Parliament of the United Kingdom
Preceded by Gervase Beckett	Member of Parliament for Scarborough and Whitby; 1922 – 1931	Succeeded by Sir Paul Latham
Preceded by Otho Nicholson	Member of Parliament for Westminster Abbey; 1932 – 1939	Succeeded by Harold Webbe
Baronetage of the United Kingdom
New creation	Baronet (of Boyton); 1936 – 1939	Extinct
