= James Swinburne =

British engineer (1858–1958)

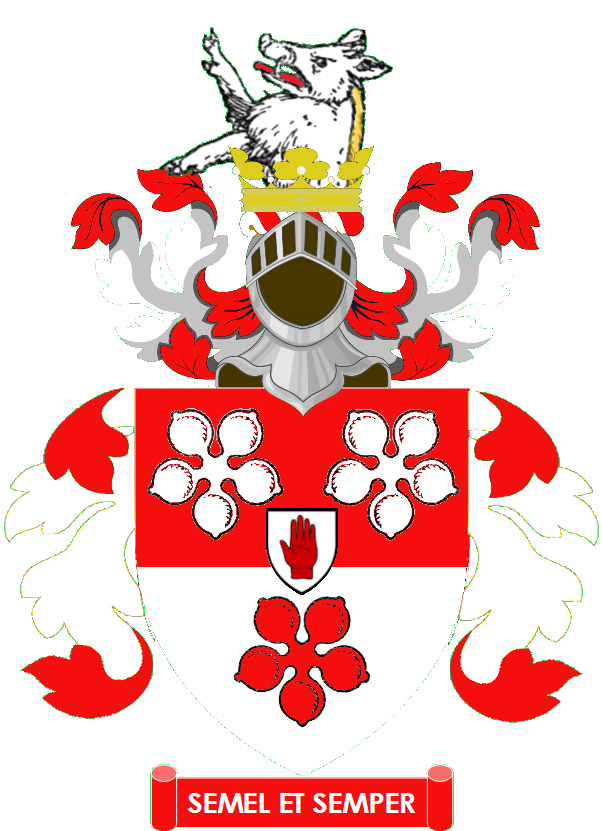
Achievement of arms

Sir James Swinburne, 9th Baronet, FRS (28 February 1858 – 30 March 1958) was a British electrical engineer and manufacturer. He was born in Inverness in 1858 into a well-known Northumbrian family. Educated at Clifton College, he went to work at a locomotive works in Manchester and later to a Tyneside firm where he became interested in electrical work. Often called the "Father of British Plastics", Swinburne revolutionized the plastics industry throughout Europe and his native Britain.

Swinburne was a prominent engineer in the electrical industry. He worked on the first electric lightbulb and coined many new electrical words. Swinburne was a member of the Institution of Electrical Engineers (IEE) for a record-breaking 73 years, serving as president from 1902 to 1903. He was named a Fellow of the Royal Society in 1906. He soon joined the Faraday Society, serving as its president from 1909 to 1911. He briefly explored thermodynamics.

His involvement with plastic began with his introduction to phenol formaldehyde. Swinburne was so impressed with the possibilities of the product that he formed a company called Fireproof Celluloid Syndicate Limited, which was dedicated to research and marketing of the product. Swinburne and Leo Baekeland later founded the Damard Lacquer Company, which eventually became Bakelite Limited, which Swinburne served as chairman and, in 1948, as honorary president.

In 1934, Swinburne succeeded his kinsman as 9th Baronet of Capheaton, Northumberland.

Sir James Swinburne died a month after his 100th birthday.

== Family ==
Swinburne had four children, two from his first marriage and two from his second;

- Anthony Swinburne, born 1887
- Spearman Charles Swinburne, born 1893
- Ida Swinburne, born 1899
- Marjorie Swinburne, born 1904

Coat of arms of James Swinburne

Crest
Out of a ducal coronet Or a demi-boar rampant Argent crined of the First, langued Gules.
Escutcheon
Per fess Gules and Argent three cinquefoils Counterchanged
Motto
Semel Et Semper (Once And Always)

== Writings ==
Swinburne authored a number of books, including:

- Practical electrical units popularly explained : with numerous illustrations and remarks (London: E. & F.N. Spon, 1883).
- Entropy; or, Thermodynamics from an engineer's standpoint, and the reversibility of thermodynamics (Westminster: Constable, 1904).

Baronetage of England
Preceded by Hubert Swinburne	Baronet (of Capheaton); 1934–1958	Succeeded by Spearman Swinburne
