= Otho Nicholson =

British politician (1891–1978)

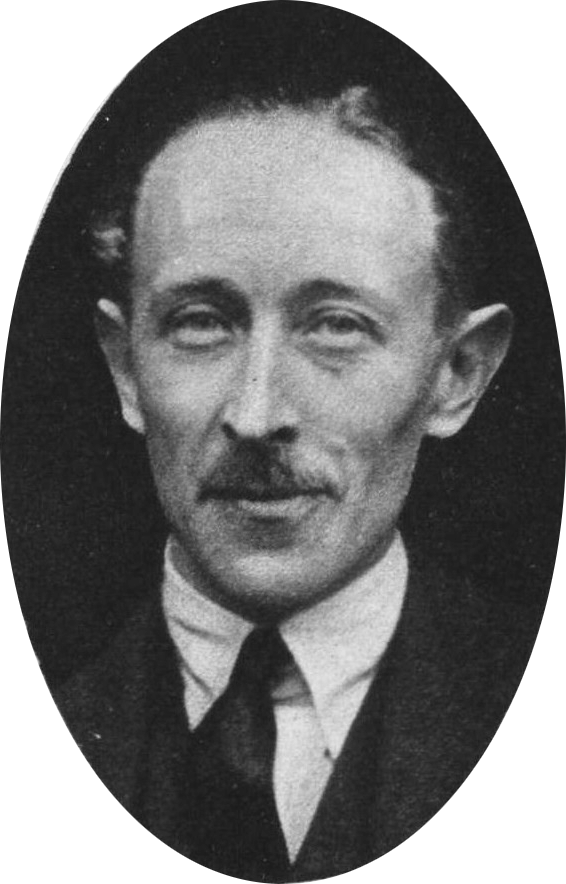
- Nicholson in 1924

Member of Parliament for Westminster Abbey
- In office 19 March 1924 – 12 July 1932
- Preceded by: John Nicholson
- Succeeded by: Sir Sidney Herbert

Personal details
- Born: Otho William Nicholson; 30 November 1891 Marylebone, London, England
- Died: 29 June 1978 (aged 86) Ringwood, England
- Party: Conservative
- Education: Harrow School
- Alma mater: Magdalene College, Cambridge

Otho William Nicholson (30 November 1891 – 29 June 1978) was a British politician. He was a Conservative member of parliament (MP) for Westminster Abbey from 1924 to 1932.

Born in Marylebone, London, Nicholson entered local politics in London: he represented Finsbury on the London County Council from 1922 to 1925 and was a member of the Finsbury Borough Council, where he served as mayor in 1923–24.

Nicholson was first elected to Parliament in a by-election on 19 March 1924 in the London constituency of Westminster Abbey, where the previous MP John Nicholson had died the month before. In the by-election he beat Winston Churchill, who stood under the "Constitutionalist" banner, by only 43 votes. Nicholson held the seat in the next three general elections. He took the post of Steward of the Manor of Northstead on 4 July 1932, a way of resigning from the Commons. A by-election to replace him was held on 12 July 1932.

On 2 March 1948, Nicholson was on a Sabena Airlines DC3 airplane when it crashed on landing at London Heathrow Airport. He was one of two out of 21 people on board to survive. Nicholson died in 1978 in Ringwood, Hampshire, aged 86.

Parliament of the United Kingdom
Preceded by John Nicholson	Member of Parliament for Westminster Abbey; 1924 – 1932	Succeeded by Sidney Herbert
