= John Nicholson (British Army officer) =

British Army general and politician (1863–1924)

Brigadier-General John Nicholson CB CMG CBE DSO MP
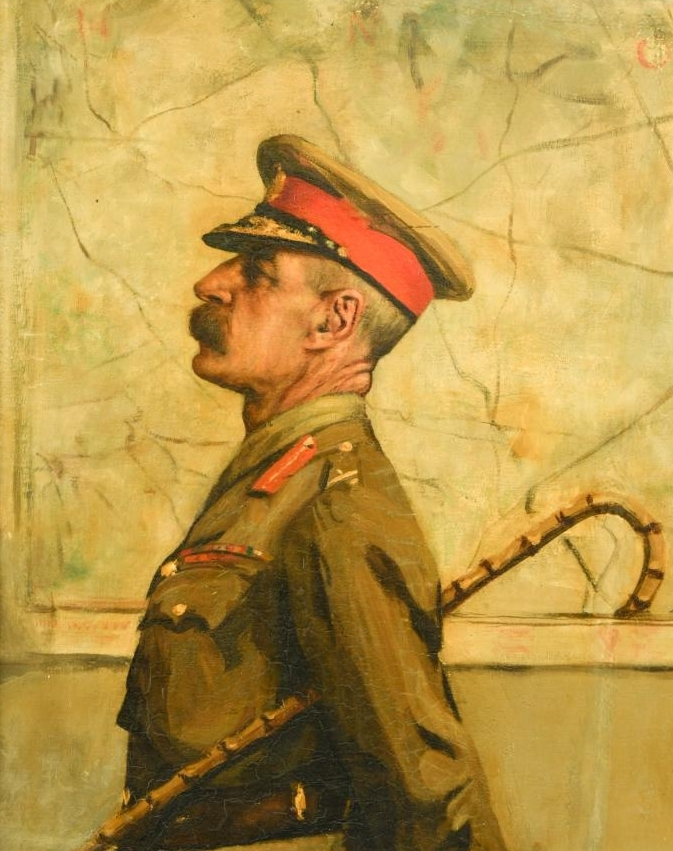
- Portrait by Raymond Woog

Member of Parliament for Westminster Abbey
- In office 25 August 1921 – 21 February 1924
- Preceded by: William Burdett-Coutts
- Succeeded by: Otho Nicholson

Personal details
- Born: John Sanctuary Nicholson; 19 May 1863 Kensington, London, England
- Died: 21 February 1924 (aged 60) Mayfair, London, England
- Party: Conservative
- Education: Harrow School
- Alma mater: Royal Military College, Sandhurst
- Occupation: Military officer, politician

Brigadier-General John Sanctuary Nicholson CB CMG CBE DSO (19 May 1863 – 21 February 1924) was a British Army officer and politician. He was a Conservative Member of Parliament (MP) from 1921 to 1924.

== Early life and education ==
Born in Kensington, London, the son of William Nicholson and his wife Isabella. He was educated at Harrow and then, in 1882, the Royal Military College at Sandhurst. He was commissioned in 7th Hussars in February 1884 and in 1886 he spent eight years in India with his regiment before in 1894 being sent to Natal.

== BSAP, Second Boer War and First World War ==
The 7th Hussars joined a force at Mafeking to suppress a native rising in Matabeleland. During these operations he raised and commanded a corps of British South Africa Police (BSAP). He became Commandant-General of the BSAP and Inspector-General of Volunteers in Rhodesia from 1898 until 1903. The Second Boer War took place in neighbouring South Africa from 1899 to June 1902, and to recognize his contribution, Nicholson was appointed a Companion of the Order of the Bath (CB) in the South Africa honours list published on 26 June 1902. In 1903 he succeeded Baden-Powell as Inspector-General of South African Constabulary and retired from the post as a colonel in 1907.

During the First World War he joined the British Expeditionary Force and from April 1915 to December 1918 was base commandant at Calais. He had been promoted to brigadier-general in 1916 and retired from the Army in 1920.

== Political career ==
With a father and brother both being members of parliament Nicholson contested a seat in East Dorset in the 1910 general election. He lost by 426 votes to Captain Guest but after a petition Guest was unseated. Nicholson stood again as a Conservative candidate in a by-election against Guest's brother Henry Guest but was defeated again by a small margin. In the second general election of 1910 in December, he tried to get elected at Stafford but was defeated by 755 votes.

In 1921, he was elected the Member of Parliament for the Westminster Abbey constituency in a by-election following the death of the incumbent MP William Burdett-Coutts. He was re-elected in the following two general elections in 1922 and 1923.

== Death ==
Nicholson, who had never married, died on 21 February 1924 of pneumonia at his house at South Audley Street, Mayfair aged 60. A by-election was held to replace him as an MP.

Parliament of the United Kingdom
Preceded by William Burdett-Coutts	Member of Parliament for Westminster Abbey; 1921 – 1924	Succeeded by Otho Nicholson
