= Herbert baronets of Derrogh (1630) =

Escutcheon of the Herbert baronets of Derrogh

The Herbert baronetcy, of Derrogh in the King's County, was created in the Baronetage of Ireland on 4 December 1630 for George Herbert or Harbertt. He was High Sheriff of King's County in 1614 and 1624.

The title became extinct on the death of the 3rd Baronet in 1712.

== Herbert baronets, of Derrogh (1630) ==
- Sir George Herbert, 1st Baronet (died c. 1650)
- Sir Edward Herbert, 2nd Baronet (c. 1620–1677)
- Sir George Herbert, 3rd Baronet (c. 1673–1712)
