= Herbert baronets of Bromfield (1660) =

Extinct English baronetcy

Escutcheon of the Herbert baronets of Bromfield

The Herbert baronetcy, of Bromfield in the County of Shropshire, was created in the Baronetage of England on 18 December 1660 for Matthew Herbert. He was the son of Francis Herbert of Dolguog, Machynlleth and his wife Frances Foxe; and grandson of Matthew Herbert. In 1654 he was High Sheriff of Shropshire.

The 1st Baronet died in the Fleet Prison in 1668, and left no children: the title became extinct. His brother Richard Herbert of Oakly Park, Bromfield was the grandfather of Henry Herbert, 1st Earl of Powis.

== Herbert baronets, of Bromfield (1660) ==
- Sir Matthew Herbert, 1st Baronet (died 1668)
