= Jack Harvey (VC) =

English soldier and recipient of the Victoria Cross

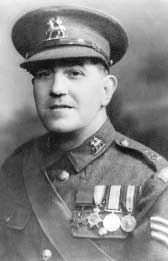
- Born: 24 August 1891; Peckham, London
- Died: 15 August 1940 (aged 48); Redhill, Surrey
- Burial place: Redstone Cemetery, Redhill
- Military career
- Allegiance: United Kingdom
- Branch: British Army
- Rank: Sergeant
- Units: The London Regiment
- Conflicts: World War I
- Awards: Victoria Cross

Jack Harvey VC (24 August 1891 – 15 August 1940) was an English recipient of the Victoria Cross, the highest and most prestigious award for gallantry in the face of the enemy that can be awarded to British and Commonwealth forces.

Harvey was a 27-year-old private in the 1/22nd (County of London) Battalion, The London Regiment (The Queen's), British Army during the First World War.

On 2 September 1918 north of Peronne, France, when the advance of his company was held up by machine gun fire, Private Harvey dashed forward a distance of 50 yards alone, through the English barrage and in the face of heavy enemy fire. He rushed a machine gun post, shooting two of the team and bayoneting another. He then destroyed the gun and continued his way along the enemy trench. He single-handedly rushed an enemy dugout which contained 37 Germans and compelled them to surrender. These acts of gallantry saved the company heavy casualties and materially assisted in the success of the operation. He was awarded the Victoria Cross for these actions.

Harvey later achieved the rank of sergeant.

== The Medal ==
His VC is on display in the Lord Ashcroft Gallery at the Imperial War Museum, London.
