= 1939 Westminster Abbey by-election =

UK parliamentary by-election

The 1939 Westminster Abbey by-election was a parliamentary by-election held on 17 May 1939 for the British House of Commons constituency of Westminster Abbey in London.

== Previous MP ==
The seat had become vacant when the Conservative Member of Parliament (MP) Sir Sidney Herbert had died on 22 March 1939. Herbert had held the seat since an unopposed 1932 by-election.

== Previous result ==
General election, 14 November 1935: Westminster Abbey
Party	Candidate	Votes	%	±%
Conservative	Sidney Herbert	18,117	77.5	N/A
Labour	William S. Kennedy	5,255	22.5	New
Majority		12,862	55.0	N/A
Turnout		23,372	49.2	N/A
Conservative hold		Swing	N/A	

== Candidates ==
The Conservative candidate was Harold Webbe. The Labour candidate in 1935, William Kennedy, had been reselected to contest the next General Election; however, the Labour party decided not to contest the by-election. The Communist party, who had not contested the seat before, chose Dr Bill Carritt. In an attempt to revive the Popular Front strategy, Carritt stood as an Independent Progressive.

== Campaign ==
Carritt's campaign chairman was Liberal MP, Richard Acland. Both the constituency Liberal and Labour parties actively supported his campaign. Those who came to speak for him in the constituency included Liberal MP Wilfrid Roberts, expelled Labour MPs Sir Stafford Cripps and George Strauss and other public figures such as J.B. Priestley.

== Result ==
Westminster Abbey by-election, 1939
Party	Candidate	Votes	%	±%
Conservative	Harold Webbe	9,678	67.4	−10.1
Independent Progressive	Bill Carritt	4,674	32.6	New
Majority		5,004	34.8	−20.2
Turnout		14,352	30.3	−18.9
Conservative hold		Swing		

Carritt attracted the highest ever percentage poll of any anti-Conservative candidate in this seat. The performance revived interest nationally in electoral co-operation to defeat National Government candidates at a General Election, expected to take place later in the year.

== Aftermath ==
In the 1945 general election, Carritt stood in Westminster Abbey as a Communist.

General election, 5 July 1945: Westminster Abbey
Party	Candidate	Votes	%	±%
Conservative	Harold Webbe	9,160	54.4	−13.0
Labour	Jeremy Hutchinson	4,408	26.1	N/A
Communist	G. Billy Carritt	2,964	17.6	New
Democratic	Norman Leith-Hay-Clark	326	1.9	New
Majority		4,752	28.3	−6.5
Turnout		16,858	58.5	+28.2
Conservative hold		Swing		

Webbe remained its MP until the constituency was abolished for the 1950 general election, when he became MP for the new Cities of London and Westminster constituency.
