= 1921 Westminster Abbey by-election =

← 1918	25 August 1921	1922 →

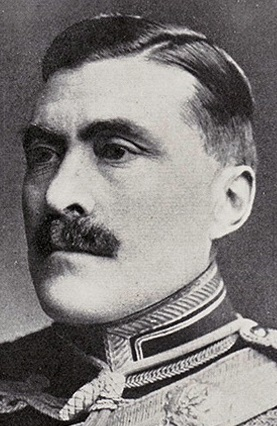

Candidate	Nicholson	Applin	Lupton
Party	Unionist	Anti-Waste League	Liberal
Popular vote	6,204	4,970	3,053
Percentage	43.6%	34.9%	21.5%
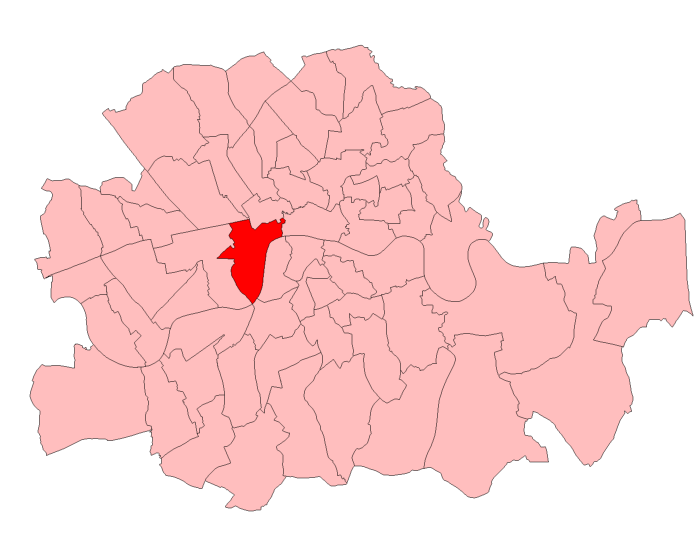
MP before election
Burdett-Coutts
Unionist
Subsequent MP
Nicholson
Unionist

The 1921 Westminster Abbey by-election was a parliamentary by-election held on 25 August 1921 for the British House of Commons constituency of Westminster Abbey in London. The seat had become vacant when the Conservative Member of Parliament (MP) William Burdett-Coutts had died on 28 July 1921. Burdett-Coutts had held the seat since it had been created for the 1918 general election, when he had been returned unopposed.

General election, 14 December 1918
Party		Candidate	Votes	%	±%
C	Unionist	William Burdett-Coutts	Unopposed		
	Unionist hold				
C indicates candidate endorsed by the coalition government.

== Candidates ==
The Unionist candidate was John Nicholson. The Liberal candidate Arnold Lupton, aged nearly 75, had previously been a member of the House of Commons from 1906 to January 1910.

== Campaign ==
At the time the Anti-Waste League was active, and all three candidates claimed to be anti-waste. The League was formed to advance the political ambitions of the newspaper owner Lord Rothermere. He is known in particular, with his brother Alfred Harmsworth, 1st Viscount Northcliffe, for the development of the British newspapers Daily Mail and Daily Mirror - he was a pioneer of popular journalism. The objects of the League were to insist upon measures being taken to restore the country to solvency, urge a wholesale reduction of expenditure, fight the battle of local rates and oppose sham Anti-Waste candidates. There was a growing element both inside and outside the Conservative element of the Coalition Government, that opposed the post-war reconstruction methods adopted by Lloyd George and other leading Liberals in the coalition, notably Christopher Addison, who as Housing Minister had introduced a series of measures to enable local councils to build Council houses. These measures were funded by higher taxation and in accordance with Lloyd George's aim to build a "Land Fit for Heroes".

== Result ==
The Unionist candidate won the election, but the Anti-Waste League candidate Reginald Applin polled respectably.

Westminster Abbey By-Election, 1921
Party	Candidate	Votes	%	±%
Unionist	John Nicholson	6,204	43.6	N/A
Anti-Waste League	Reginald Applin	4,970	34.9	New
Liberal	Arnold Lupton	3,053	21.5	New
Majority		1,234	8.7	N/A
Turnout		15,131	38.5	N/A
Unionist hold		Swing	N/A	

== Aftermath ==
Nicholson remained the constituency's MP until his death in 1924, when a further by-election was held. Applin became the Conservative MP for Enfield in 1924

General election, 15 November 1922: Westminster Abbey
Party	Candidate	Votes	%	±%
Unionist	John Nicholson	13,620	75.6	+32.0
Labour	Joseph Butler	2,454	13.6	New
Independent	Sidney Robert Drury-Lowe	1,950	10.8	New
Majority		11,166	62.0	+53.3
Turnout		18,024	49.0	+10.5
Unionist hold		Swing		
