= Harold Webbe =

British politician

Sir Harold Webbe CBE DL

Member of Parliament for Cities of London and Westminster Westminster Abbey (1939–1950)
- In office 17 May 1939 – 18 September 1959
- Preceded by: Sir Sidney Herbert
- Succeeded by: Sir Harry Hylton-Foster

Personal details
- Born: William Harold Webbe; 30 September 1885 Solihull, Warwickshire, England
- Died: 22 April 1965 (aged 79) Surrey, England
- Party: Conservative
- Education: King Edward's School, Birmingham
- Alma mater: Queens' College, Cambridge

Sir William Harold Webbe, CBE DL (30 September 1885 – 22 April 1965) was a British politician. He was a Conservative Member of Parliament (MP) from 1939 to 1959.

Born in Solihull, Webbe was educated at King Edward's School, Birmingham and Queens' College, Cambridge, which he attended from 1904 to 1907. During World War I, he worked at the Ministry of Munitions. He worked as a director of several companies.

Webbe was a member of the London County Council from 1925 to 1949, representing Camberwell North West and then serving as an alderman, and he led the Municipal Reform Party on the council for 12 years. He was a Deputy Lieutenant of the County of London. On 17 May 1939, he was first elected to Parliament in a by-election in the London constituency of Westminster Abbey, following the death of Sir Sidney Herbert, Bt. He remained the seat's MP until it was abolished for the 1950 general election, when he was elected for the new constituency of the Cities of London and Westminster. He retired from Parliament at the 1959 general election. He died in Surrey aged 79.

== Sources ==
- The Times House of Commons 1955. 1955.
- Leigh Rayment's Historical List of MPs

Parliament of the United Kingdom
Preceded by Sir Sidney Herbert, Bt	Member of Parliament for Westminster Abbey; 1939 – 1950	Constituency abolished
New constituency	Member of Parliament for the Cities of London & Westminster; 1950 – 1959	Succeeded by Sir Harry Hylton-Foster
Party political offices
Preceded by William Ray	Leader of the Municipal Reform Party on London County Council; 1934–1946	Succeeded by Henry Brooke as leader of the Conservative Party on London County Council
