= Herbert baronets of Tintern (1660) =

Escutcheon of the Herbert baronets of Tintern

The Herbert baronetcy, of Tintern in the County of Monmouth, was created in the Baronetage of England on 3 July 1660 for the traveller and historian Thomas Herbert. The title became extinct on the death of the 6th Baronet in 1740.

== Herbert baronets, of Tintern (1660) ==
- Sir Thomas Herbert, 1st Baronet (1606–1682)
- Sir Henry Herbert, 2nd Baronet (1639–1687)
- Sir Humphrey Herbert, 3rd Baronet (c. 1674–1701)
- Sir Thomas Herbert, 4th Baronet (c. 1700–1724)
- Sir Henry Herbert, 5th Baronet (c. 1675–1733)
- Sir Charles Herbert, 6th Baronet (1680–1740)
