= 1924 Westminster Abbey by-election =

UK parliamentary by-election

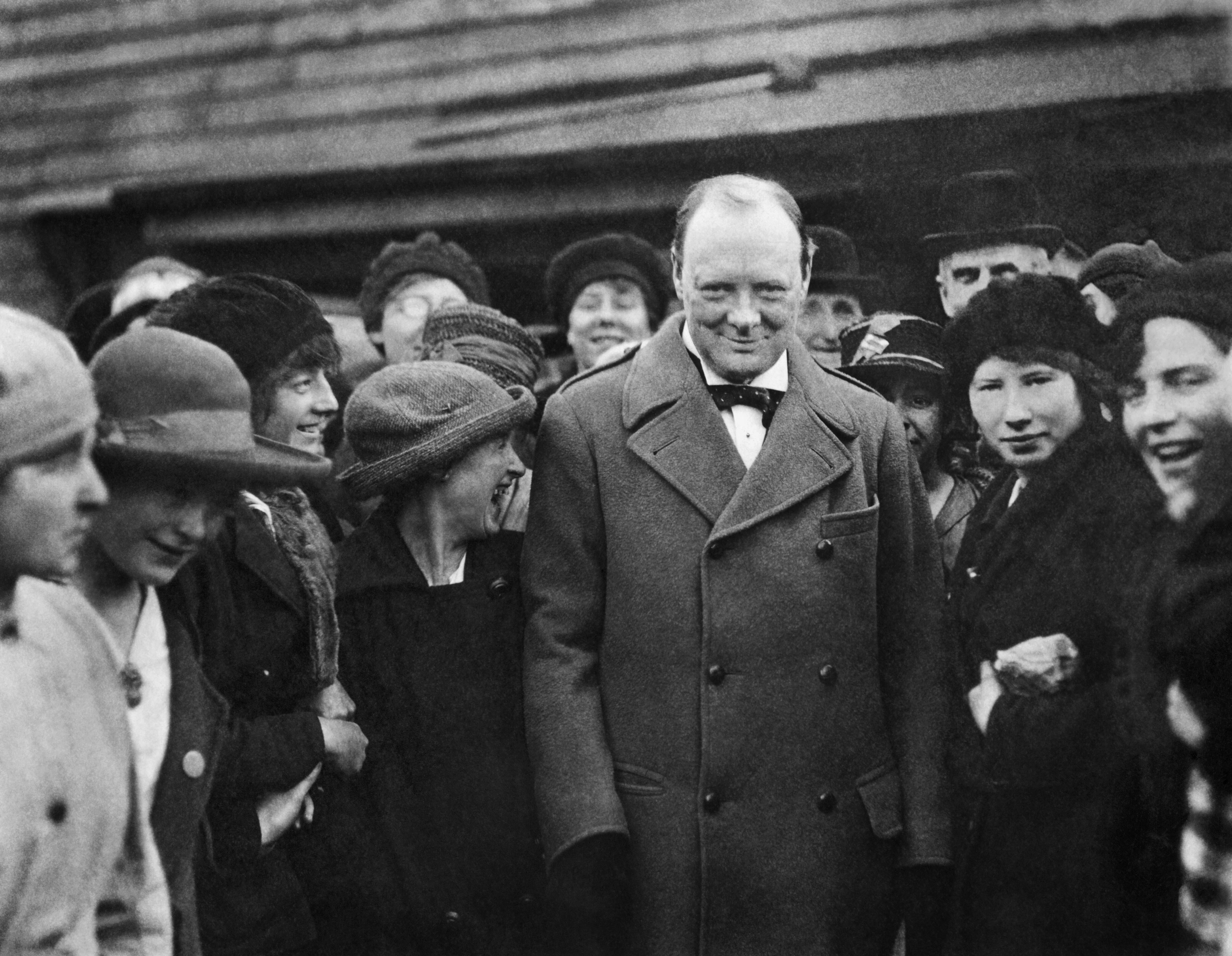
Winston Churchill

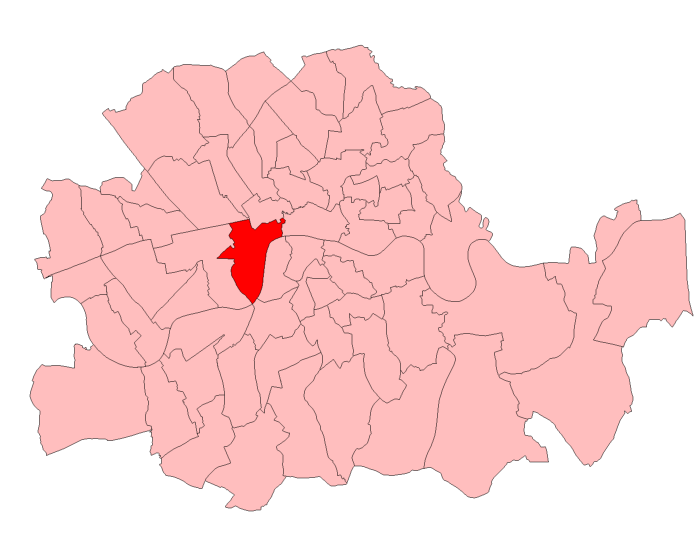
Abbey in the County of London, showing boundaries used in 1924

The 1924 Westminster Abbey by-election was a parliamentary by-election held on 19 March 1924 for the British House of Commons constituency of Westminster Abbey in London. It was notable for the challenge of Winston Churchill to the party system.

== Vacancy ==
The seat had become vacant when the Unionist Member of Parliament (MP) John Nicholson died on 21 February 1924. Nicholson had held the seat since a 1921 by-election.

== Candidates ==
Winston Churchill quickly announced his candidature. He had lost his seat of Dundee in the 1922 general election as a National Liberal follower of David Lloyd George. In 1923 following reconciliation between Lloyd George and H. H. Asquith at the 1923 general election he had stood unsuccessfully as a Liberal candidate in Leicester West. He favoured the restoration of a coalition between Liberals and Unionists. He stood in the Westminster Abbey by-election as a "Constitutionalist" and received unofficial Unionist support. At first it seemed Churchill would be officially supported by the Unionists' local organisation the Westminster Abbey Constitutional Association, but they decided to nominate their own candidate, Otho Nicholson, the nephew of the former member. The Labour Party selected Fenner Brockway. Churchill had hoped that his candidature might have been endorsed by the Abbey Liberal Association or have received the backing of Liberal leader Asquith, but the local Liberals adopted James Scott Duckers. In fact, Abbey Liberals stated that Scott Duckers name would only go forward if Churchill was a candidate. Churchill thus found his candidature opposed by candidates of all three main political parties.

== Party prospects ==
=== Unionist ===
The official Unionist candidate had been elected after each of the 4 previous contests since the seat was created in 1918. Two of those contest were unopposed returns. Of the other two, the 1922 contests saw them poll a massive 75.6% of the vote. In the fourth contest, the 1921 by-election, the Unionist vote was split but the official Unionist still managed to poll 43.6%.

=== Labour ===
Only once before had a Labour candidate stood, in the 1922 elections when they polled 13.6 percent. In that election their candidate had to compete for the anti-Unionist vote with an Independent candidate with Liberal leanings. A more active Labour party campaign might hope to poll much better but without the expectation of winning.

=== Liberal ===
The only election the Liberals had contested was the 1921 by-election when their candidate had garnered all the anti-Unionist vote in polling 21.5%. In 1922 the Independent candidate was thought to have won only Liberal support in polling 10.8%. A campaign lacking the intensity of the Liberal campaign run in 1921 would not be treated seriously.

=== Constitutionalist ===
The 1921 by-election had shown a willingness among the mass Unionist electorate to vote for an unofficial candidate. However, both Unionists standing in that election were standing on a ticket opposed to the Coalition government that Churchill was advocating. It would take a personality like that of Churchill to have any chance of winning.

== Campaign ==
Unionist MPs chaired each of Churchill's election committees. The Beaverbrook and Rothermere newspapers supported his candidature. Unionist leader Stanley Baldwin stayed officially neutral. When leading Unionist Leo Amery campaigned against Churchill and in favour of Nicholson, Baldwin allowed former Unionist Prime Minister Arthur Balfour to release a public letter to the press supporting Churchill. Celebrity sportsmen, jockey Steve Donoghue and boxer Jimmy Wilde publicly supported Churchill. The Labour party supporting Daily Herald ran stories on 'Wealthy Westminster Housing Scandal' in an effort to appeal to the working class part of the constituency living in bad housing.

== Result ==
The Unionist candidate Otho Nicholson held the seat for the party. Nicholson won by just 43 votes over Churchill;

Duckers, Brockway & Nicholson

1924 Westminster Abbey by-election
| Party | Candidate | Votes | % | ±% |
|---|---|---|---|---|
| Unionist | Otho Nicholson | 8,187 | 35.9 | N/A |
| Constitutionalist | Winston Churchill | 8,144 | 35.8 | N/A |
| Labour | Fenner Brockway | 6,156 | 27.0 | N/A |
| Liberal | James Scott Duckers | 291 | 1.3 | N/A |
| Majority | | 43 | 0.1 | N/A |
| Turnout | | 22,778 | 61.6 | N/A |
| Unionist hold | | Swing | N/A | |

At the end of the count Churchill was 33 votes behind Nicholson, at which point Churchill's agent believing his candidate could still win requested a recount. It was only to see the winning majority of Nicholson increase to 43.

Churchill had come close to defeating the party machines. The extent of his support was mainly due to the backing he received from significant sections of the London press who backed him as a personality rather than in support for a Unionist/Liberal coalition.

== Aftermath ==
The action of the Abbey Liberal Association in opposing Churchill marked the parting of the ways between the Liberal Party and a man who was, after Lloyd George, the most popular individual in the party. At the 1924 general election, Nicholson held the seat as the only Unionist candidate. Churchill was re-elected to Parliament elsewhere as a Constitutionalist, one of only a handful of candidates to win election under that label. Brockway later became a Labour MP for Leyton East. Scott Duckers did not stand again.
