= Eugene Stock =

British author (1836–1928)

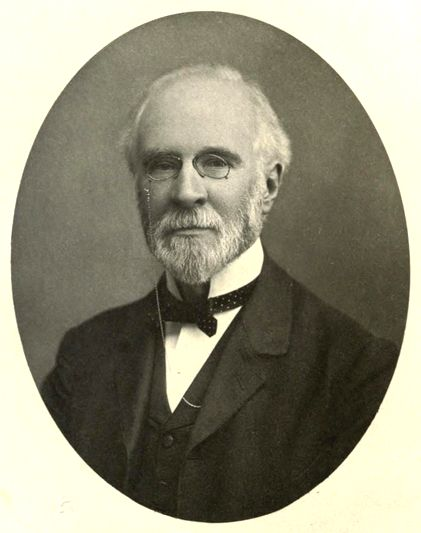

Personal life
- Born: 26 February 1836 Westminster, London, England
- Died: 7 September 1928 (aged 92) Bournemouth, Dorset, England
- Spouse: Isabella Emily Fiennes (m. 1902)
- Notable work: The History of the Church Missionary Society (1899–1916)
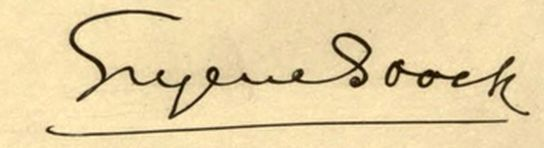
- Signature

Religious life
- Religion: Anglicanism

Eugene Stock (26 February 1836 – 7 September 1928), was an English author, historian, journal editor and senior editorial secretary at the Church Missionary Society in London. Widely regarded as an authority among his contemporaries, Stock is best known for his four-volume work, The History of the Church Missionary Society, published in 1899, which is considered the most thorough account on the history of the Church Missionary Society (CMS) and the many missions it had reign over. Because of his extensive knowledge of CMS history, Stock became the senior secretary of the society. He also lectured to women at missionary meeting places in London, and promoted the idea of recruiting women for missionary service.

== Early life ==
Eugene Stock was born on February 26, 1836 in Westminster, London, during the short reign of William IV, when he was King of Hanover. After completing his basic education in London and Brighton public schools he continued with his studies and largely taught himself without the aid of a university or clerical background that secretaries of his caliber were generally known to possess. His first memories of English royalty began when he was a youth during the reign of Queen Victoria. Stock was the eldest child of his father through his first marriage, and was born in a home on Dule Street in Westminster.Because of an unstable circumstances the Stock family never had much of a change to settle into a permanent house His mother died when he was about ten years old. His earliest memories are of a ferry ride with his mother to the Isle of Wight from Portsmouth on the southern coast of England.

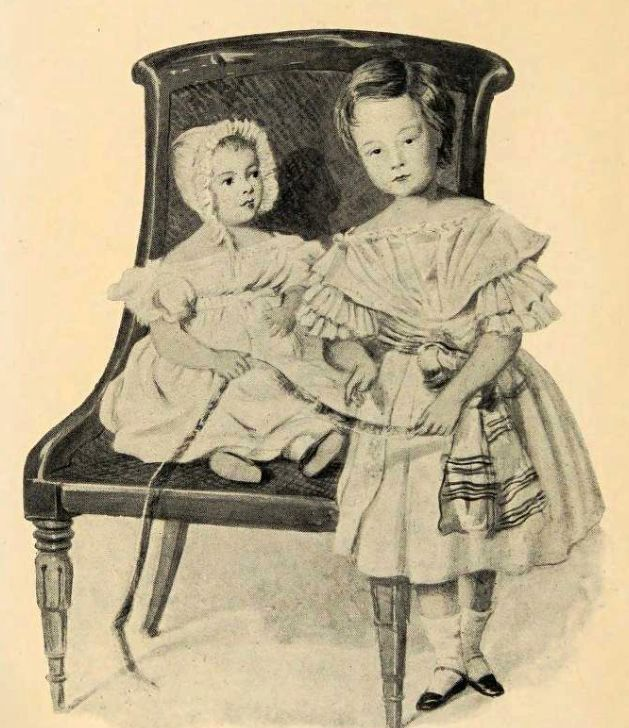
Eugene Stock (left) and sister Sarah Geraldina in their youth

Little else is known about his boyhood years, or his parents, as there were very few surviving family letters and no boyhood friends who outlived him. Subsequently, there are only two primary sources from which to draw upon for this information. One is Stock's occasional references to his boyhood memories and those of various incidents that had occurred then, and which were only made occasionally to friends, relatives and friends. Other sources include a series of papers that Stock made when he was about seventy years of age for one of the church weekly papers, which were later further expanded, and published in a volume now out of print. Much of this information was covered in Stock's 1909 publication, My Recollections, which was not an attempt at an autobiography, but is a work outlining the notable events in his life, and which only contains one chapter of Stock's earlier years, to which he wrote:

"These Recollections are not intended to form an autobiography, and I have no thought of putting into print the uninteresting details of my personal life. But to note a few leading facts seems necessary, in order to make the following chapters intelligible."

Stock's father was a man of position and wealth, who was often in France where he lost his entire fortune through speculations on grain, flour, sugar and other such commodities involving the French Bourse.an investment firm His mother was a highly educated and accomplished lady, whose assets and property were almost entirely lost in the same manner. His mother subsequently was left with Stock and his two sisters whom she struggled to provided for with what little was left of her remaining fortune.

== Career ==
Stock joined the Church Missionary Society as an editor in 1873 and soon became its editorial secretary in 1875, supervisor of all their publications, including its influential journal, The Intelligencer. He initially began as its editor by assisting Reverend G, Knox, where he conceived of the idea of merging The Intelligencer with the Church Missionary Record which was effected in 1875. The two worked together for about three years, after which Knox resigned and Stock became the sole editor. By 1881 he became full secretary for the Society. Throughout the 1880s because of his vast knowledge of Church Missionary Society's history, his influence grew, especially where it involved issues that required a historical perspective to resolve. Stock's four volume History of the Church Missionary Society (1899–1916) is considered his greatest work, and the most thorough account of missionary history writing in the nineteenth and early twentieth centuries, providing many insights into the missionaries and missionary life during this time. Volume IV of this series was written some years after the others when Stock was eighty years of age.

A missionary with strong evangelical principles, Stock was still a loyal churchman who helped to lead the CMS away from some of the more radical tenants of the Protestant religion. He was a member of several church organizations, which included the London Diocesan Conference, the National Church Assembly, and the Houses of Laymen, but still praised missionary Ecumenism with the High Church Party.

Henry Venn one of the founders of the Church Missionary Society who had the general approval of his missionary positions, and who had a significant influence on Stock and his views on missionary life. However, there is speculation that Stock may have been subjugated by his own immediate surroundings and experiences that apparently made him abandon some of Venn's positions regarding missionary work in underdeveloped foreign lands with the idea that such efforts would have been better directed at his own countrymen and other European countries.

Stock was an outspoken critic of Robert Needham Cust who was active in the British and Foreign Bible Society and who tended to alienate himself for his criticism of the CMS for their abandonment of some of Venn's policies. Stock subsequently described Cust as “inconsistent, cantankerous and far too liberal".

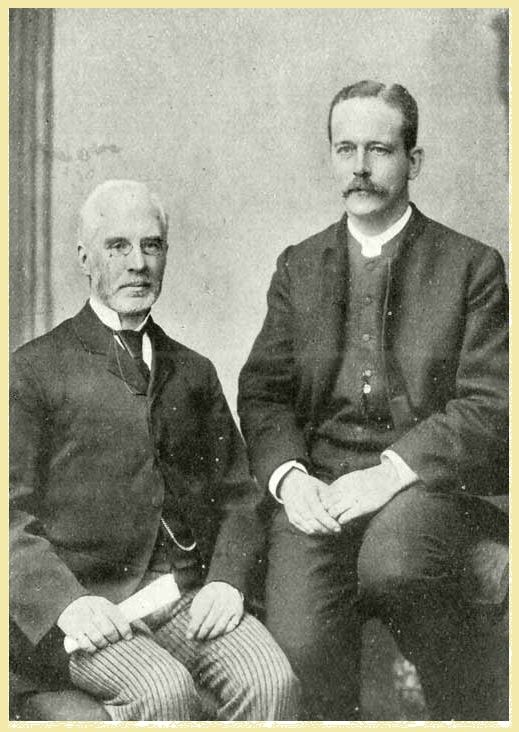
Eugene Stock & Rev Stewart, Sydney, 1892

In the late nineteenth century members of the Church in Australia and in New Zealand needed assistance at the given missions in these colonies. At the time there was no church organization of any consequence. Members of the church in Australia appealed to the Church Missionary Society asking them to send more missionary workers to help them better achieve their various missionary objectives. In 1892. Eugene Stock and the Reverend Robert Stewart, a former missionary in China, were commissioned to tour these colonies to help and advise them in their efforts. As a result, the formation of Church Missionary Associations in both Australia and New Zealand were successfully effected.

Stock's position as a CMS official was less than traditional in some respects and had frequently advocated for women to become involved at the missions and often encouraged them to consider such a tasking and demanding vocation. For twenty years he lectured at missionary meeting places in London, which included, "The Willows" and " The Olives", training homes, which were under the auspices of the Mildmay Institutions. They were attended by women of the Church Missionary Society and the Church of England Zenana Missionary Society for training prospective missionaries, and was founded by William Pennefather and his wife.

Contemporary criticism of Christian missionary work, especially in Africa, did not emerge in any significant measure until after Stock had written his four-volume work, History of the Church Missionary Society in 1916. Despite the fact that Christian missions provided aid and education and were successful in converting many central African tribes from the practice of cannibalism and human sacrifice to Christianity, and for largely ending the Arab slave trade, often noted by Stock his works, regardless, were sometimes been criticized for having a partisan bias in terms of missionary successes.

During his missionary career Stock made missionary observations and inquiries in Canada, the United States, Australia, New Zealand, and India.

== Later years ==
Because of declining health Stock was compelled to voluntarily resign his position as editorial secretary in 1902. He remained a CMS secretary without pay until his retirement in 1906. Thereafter he was appointed a vice-president to the society and regularly attended the general committee for twelve more years. He continued as one of the most influential advocate of foreign missions. At age sixty-six Stock married Isabella Emily Fiennes, a widow, on August 20, 1902, at Saint Saviour's Church in South Hampstead, London. In 1908 he was awarded an honorary degree of DCL by the University of Durham. As a result of an accident with an automobile he soon died on September 7, 1928 at his home in Bournemouth, and was buried in Bournemouth cemetery.

== Works ==
- Stock, Eugene (1899). The History of the Church Missionary Society : its environment, its men and its work. Vol. I. London: Church Missionary Society.
- —— (1899). The History of the Church Missionary Society : its environment, its men and its work. Vol. II. London: Church Missionary Society.
- —— (1899). The History of the Church Missionary Society : its environment, its men and its work. Vol. III. London: Church Missionary Society.
- —— (1916). The History of the Church Missionary Society : its environment, its men and its work. Vol. IV. London: Church Missionary Society.

- —— (1885). Lesson studies from the book of Genesis. Religious Tract Society.
- —— (1877). The Story of the Fuh-Kien Mission of the Church Missionary Society. .London: Seeley, Jackson, & Halliday.
- —— (1983). Practical Truths from the Pastoral Epistles. Grand Rapid: Kregel Publications.
- ____ (1899) Experimental Religion: An Address at the Church Congress. London: Marshall Bros
- —— (1904). A Short Handbook of Missions. London: Longmans, Green and Co.
- ____ (1910) The English Church in the Nineteenth Century. London: Longmans, Green and Co. Grand Rapids, Mich. : Kregel Publications
- —— (1913). The Story of the New Zealand Mission. London: Church Missionary Society.
- —— (1913). An heroic bishop : the life-story of French of Lahore. London & Toronto: Hodder and Stoughton.
- —— (1917). Plain Talks on the Pastoral Epistles. London: R. Scott.
- —— (1955) [1917]. Talks on St Luke’s Gospel. Grand Rapids, Mich.: Baker Book House.
- —— (1983). Practical truths from the Pastoral Epistles. Grand Rapids, Mich: Kregel Publications.

== See also ==
- William Taylor (missionary) — A renowned 19th Reverend/Bishop who established missions around the world.
- Alexander Murdoch Mackay — A 19th century missionary in Uganda and advisor to the African explorer Henry Morton Stanley
- Robert Moffat (missionary) — A 19th century missionary in South Africa, the first to translate the Bible into a native language

== Bibliography ==
- Gollock, Georgina Anne (1929). Eugene Stock : a biographical study. London: Church Missionary Society.
- Hewitt, Gordon (1971). The Problems of Success, A History of the Church Missionary Society 1910–1942. Vol. 1. ISBN 978-0-33400-2529.
- Stock, Eugene (1909). My recollections. London: James Nesbit & Company.
- Maughan, Stephen S. (2004). Oxford dictionary of national biography : in association with the British Academy. Vol. DII. Oxford; New York: Oxford University Press. p. 820.
- "Stock, Eugene (1836-1928); Missionary editor, administrator, and historian". School of Theology, Boston University.
- Williams, Peter (1998). Biographical Dictionary of Christian Missions. p. 642. ISBN 978-0-80284-6808.

=== Related reading ===
- Lake, Edward John (1879). The Church Missionary atlas. Containing an account of the various countries in which the Church Missionary Society labours, and of its missionary operations. London: Church Missionary House.
- Mirza, Umair (2014). The Cambridge History of Christianity, Volume 8. Cambridge University Press. ISBN 978-1-10742-3701.
- Warren, Max (1965). The Missionary Movement from Britain in Modern History. S.C.M. Press.
