= 1775 in Scotland =

- Centuries: 16th; 17th; 18th; 19th; 20th
- Decades: 1750s; 1760s; 1770s; 1780s; 1790s
- See also: List of years in Scotland; Timeline of Scottish history 1775 in: Great Britain • Wales • Elsewhere

Events from the year 1775 in Scotland.

== Incumbents ==
=== Law officers ===
- Lord Advocate – James Montgomery; then Henry Dundas;
- Solicitor General for Scotland – Henry Dundas; then Alexander Murray

=== Judiciary ===
- Lord President of the Court of Session – Lord Arniston, the younger
- Lord Justice General – Duke of Queensberry
- Lord Justice Clerk – Lord Barskimming

== Events ==
- Colliers and Salters (Scotland) Act 1775 provides for gradual removal of conditions of servitude on coal miners.
- The power of the burgh of Stirling to manage its own affairs is suspended when the Black Bond comes to light.
- Village of Tomintoul laid out by Alexander Gordon, 4th Duke of Gordon.
- John Howie's Biographia Scoticana is published.
- Samuel Johnson's A Journey to the Western Islands of Scotland is published.

== Births ==
- 12 March – Henry Eckford, shipbuilder in New York (died 1832 in Constantinople)
- 30 April – George Kinloch, radical politician (died 1833 in London)
- 8 September – John Leyden, orientalist (died 1811 in Java)
- 9 October – Sir Alexander Boswell, 1st Baronet, politician, poet, songwriter and antiquary (killed in duel 1822)
- 26 October – Alexander Thom, military surgeon, judge and politician (died 1858 in Canada)
- 13 November – John Burns, surgeon (drowned 1850)
- 14 December – Thomas Cochrane, 10th Earl of Dundonald, admiral (died 1860 in London)

== Deaths ==
- 17 June – John Pitcairn, major in the marines (born 1722; killed in Battle of Bunker Hill)
- 18 November – Robert Forbes, Episcopal Bishop of Ross and Caithness (born 1708)
- 28 December – John Campbell, author (born 1708)

== See also ==
- Timeline of Scottish history
