= Sydney Gedge =

British politician (1829–1923)

- Gedge in 1895

Member of Parliament for Stockport
- In office 1886–1892
- Preceded by: Louis John Jennings; William Tipping
- Succeeded by: Louis John Jennings; Sir Joseph Leigh

Member of Parliament for Walsall
- In office 1895–1900
- Preceded by: Sir Arthur Divett Hayter
- Succeeded by: Sir Arthur Divett Hayter

Personal details
- Born: 16 October 1829 North Runcton, Norfolk, United Kingdom
- Died: 6 April 1923 (aged 93) Mitcham, Surrey, United Kingdom
- Party: Conservative
- Education: Corpus Christi College, Cambridge

Sydney Gedge (16 October 1829 – 6 April 1923) was a British Conservative politician and prominent lay member of the Church of England.

== Early life and education ==
Gedge was born on 16 October in North Runcton, Norfolk. He was the eldest son of the Reverend Sydney Gedge. He received his education at King Edward's School, Birmingham and later attended Corpus Christi College, Cambridge, He graduated in 1854 with a first-class degree in the Moral Science Tripos.

== Legal career ==
Gedge became a solicitor and served as a senior partner in Gedge, Fisher & Gedge, a law firm. In 1870, the firm became solicitors to the London School Board, and Gedge held that position of solicitor to the board for twenty years.

== Political career ==
Gedge made his first attempt at parliamentary election in 1880 as a candidate for Cambridge, but was unsuccessful. He contested Luton as a conservative candidate in 1885 but was defeated.

In 1886 he was elected as one of two Conservative Members of Parliament (MPs) for Stockport, serving until his defeat in the 1892 general election. He returned to the House of Commons in 1895 as the MP for Walsall, defeating the sitting Liberal Arthur Hayter. However, in the 1900 general election Hayter regained the Walsall seat, ending Gedge's parliamentary career.

Beyond parliament, Gedge remained active in local governance. In November 1900, he was elected member of the London School Board. In 1901, he ran for the London County Council but was unsuccessful.

== Involvement in the Church of England ==
Gedge was actively involved in the Church of England, serving as a diocesan lay reader of London and Rochester and he was also a member of the House of Laymen of the General Synod. Additionally He was a governor of several religious and educational institutions, including Ridley Hall, Wycliffe Hall, Westfield College for Women, and Christ's Hospital, and Chairman of Henley's Telegraph Works Co. He was associated with the Church Missionary Society. And was a member of the Carlton Club and the Junior Constitutional Club.

== Personal life and death ==
Gedge married Augusta Herring in 1857. He died at his home in Mitcham, Surrey, on 6 April 1923, aged 93.

Parliament of the United Kingdom
Preceded by Louis John Jennings; William Tipping	Member of Parliament for Stockport; 1886–1892; With: Louis John Jennings	Succeeded by Louis John Jennings; Sir Joseph Leigh
Preceded by Sir Arthur Divett Hayter	Member of Parliament for Walsall; 1895–1900	Succeeded by Sir Arthur Divett Hayter
