= Queensferry (Parliament of Scotland constituency) =

Constituency of the Old Parliament of Scotland

Queensferry (now called South Queensferry) in Linlithgowshire was a royal burgh that returned one commissioner to the Parliament of Scotland and to the Convention of Estates.

After the Acts of Union 1707, Queensferry, Culross, Dunfermline, Inverkeithing and Stirling formed the Stirling district of burghs, returning one member between them to the House of Commons of Great Britain.

== List of burgh commissioners ==
- 1661–63, 1665 convention, 1667 convention, 1669–74, 1678 convention: Archibald Wilson, bailie
- 1685–86: John Rule, bailie
- 1689 (convention), 1689–1701, 1702–04: Sir William Hamilton of Whytelaw, senator (died c.1704)
- 1705–07: Sir James Stewart of Goodtrees

== See also ==
- List of constituencies in the Parliament of Scotland at the time of the Union
