= Stirling Burghs =

Parliamentary constituency in the United Kingdom, 1801–1918

- Former district of burghs constituency for the House of Commons
- Major settlements: Stirling, Dunfermline, Inverkeithing, Queensferry, Culross

1708–1918
- Seats: One
- Created from: Culross; Dunfermline; Inverkeithing; Queensferry; Stirling
- Replaced by: Stirling & Falkirk Burghs; Dunfermline Burghs and others

Stirling Burghs was a district of burghs constituency of the House of Commons of Great Britain from 1708 and the House of Commons of the Parliament of the United Kingdom from 1801 to 1918.

== Creation ==
The British parliamentary constituency was created in 1708 following the Acts of Union, 1707 and replaced the former Parliament of Scotland burgh constituencies of Stirling, Culross, Dunfermline, Inverkeithing and Queensferry

== Boundaries ==
The constituency comprised the burghs of Stirling in Stirlingshire, Dunfermline, and Inverkeithing in Fife, Queensferry, in Linlithgowshire (West Lothian), and Culross, which was an exclave of Perthshire, transferring to Fife in 1889. By 1832, the burgh of Queensferry had become the burgh of South Queensferry.

== History ==
The constituency elected one Member of Parliament (MP) by the first past the post system until the seat was abolished for the 1918 general election.

In 1918, Stirling became part of Stirling and Falkirk Burghs and Dunfermline became part of Dunfermline Burghs, with the other burghs being represented as part of their respective counties.

== Members of Parliament ==
Election	Member	Party
1708	John Erskine	
1710	Henry Cunningham	
1728	Lord Erskine	
1734	Peter Halkett	
1741	James Erskine	
1747	George Haldane	
1758	Robert Haldane	
1761	Francis Holburne	
1768	James Masterton	
1774	Archibald Campbell	
1780	James Campbell	
1789	Archibald Campbell	
1791	Andrew Cochrane (from 1793, Cochrane Johnstone)	
1797	William Tait	
1800	Alexander Cochrane	
1806	Sir John Henderson, Bt	
1807	Alexander Campbell	
1818	John Campbell	
1819	Francis Primrose	
1820	Robert Downie	Non Partisan
1830	James Johnston	Non Partisan
1832	Archibald Primrose, Lord Dalmeny	Whig
1847	John Benjamin Smith	Radical
1852	Sir James Anderson	Radical
1859	James Caird	Liberal
1865	Laurence Oliphant	Liberal
1868	John Ramsay	Liberal
1868	Sir Henry Campbell-Bannerman	Liberal
1908	Arthur Ponsonby	Liberal
1918	constituency abolished	

== Election results 1708-1885 ==
=== Elections in the 1830s ===
General election 1830: Stirling Burghs
Party	Candidate	Votes	%	±%
Nonpartisan	James Johnston (MP)	3	60.0	
Nonpartisan	Robert Downie (MP)	2	40.0	
Majority		1	20.0	
Turnout		5	c. 4.9	
Registered electors		c. 103		
Nonpartisan gain from Nonpartisan		Swing		

General election 1831: Stirling Burghs
Party	Candidate	Votes	%
Nonpartisan	James Johnston (MP)	Unopposed	
Registered electors		c. 103	
Nonpartisan hold			

General election 1832: Stirling Burghs
Party	Candidate	Votes	%
Whig	Archibald Primrose	492	57.3
Whig	James Johnston (MP)	366	42.7
Majority		126	14.6
Turnout		858	89.7
Registered electors		956	
Whig gain from Nonpartisan			

General election 1835: Stirling Burghs
Party	Candidate	Votes	%	±%
Whig	Archibald Primrose	418	54.8	−2.5
Radical	John Crawfurd	345	45.2	N/A
Majority		73	9.6	−5.0
Turnout		763	72.0	−17.7
Registered electors		1,060		
Whig hold		Swing	−2.5	

Primrose was appointed as a Civil Lord of the Admiralty, requiring a by-election.

By-election, 5 May 1835: Stirling Burghs
Party	Candidate	Votes	%
Whig	Archibald Primrose	Unopposed	
Whig hold			

General election 1837: Stirling Burghs
Party	Candidate	Votes	%	±%
Whig	Archibald Primrose	455	99.6	+44.8
Radical	Thomas Perronet Thompson	2	0.4	−44.8
Majority		453	99.2	+89.6
Turnout		457	36.8	−35.2
Registered electors		1,241		
Whig hold		Swing	+44.8	

=== Elections in the 1840s ===
General election 1841: Stirling Burghs
Party	Candidate	Votes	%	±%
Whig	Archibald Primrose	438	51.0	−48.6
Radical	James Aytoun	420	49.0	+48.6
Majority		18	2.0	−97.2
Turnout		858	75.2	+38.4
Registered electors		1,141		
Whig hold		Swing	−48.6	

General election 1847: Stirling Burghs
Party	Candidate	Votes	%	±%
Radical	John Benjamin Smith	345	42.4	−6.6
Whig	Alexander Ramsay-Gibson-Maitland	312	38.4	−12.6
Whig	Alexander Alison	156	19.2	N/A
Majority		33	4.0	N/A
Turnout		813	72.3	−2.9
Registered electors		1,125		
Radical gain from Whig		Swing		

=== Elections in the 1850s ===
General election 1852: Stirling Burghs
Party	Candidate	Votes	%	±%
Radical	James Anderson	431	51.2	+8.8
Whig	John Miller	411	48.8	−8.8
Majority		20	2.4	−1.6
Turnout		842	76.8	+4.5
Registered electors		1,097		
Radical hold		Swing	+8.8	

General election 1857: Stirling Burghs
Party	Candidate	Votes	%	±%
Radical	James Anderson	Unopposed		
Registered electors		1,149		
Radical hold				

General election 1859: Stirling Burghs
Party	Candidate	Votes	%	±%
Liberal	James Caird	Unopposed		
Registered electors		1,224		
Liberal hold				

=== Elections in the 1860s ===
General election 1865: Stirling Burghs
Party	Candidate	Votes	%	±%
Liberal	Laurence Oliphant	Unopposed		
Registered electors		1,262		
Liberal hold				

Oliphant resigned, causing a by-election.

By-election, 30 April 1868: Stirling Burghs
Party	Candidate	Votes	%	±%
Liberal	John Ramsay	565	53.4	N/A
Liberal	Henry Campbell-Bannerman	494	46.6	N/A
Majority		71	6.8	N/A
Turnout		1,059	84.2	N/A
Registered electors		1,257		
Liberal hold		Swing	N/A	

General election 1868: Stirling Burghs
Party	Candidate	Votes	%	±%
Liberal	Henry Campbell-Bannerman	2,201	56.7	N/A
Liberal	John Ramsay	1,682	43.3	N/A
Majority		519	13.4	N/A
Turnout		3,883	88.8	N/A
Registered electors		4,372		
Liberal hold		Swing	N/A	

=== Elections in the 1870s ===
General election 1874: Stirling Burghs
Party	Candidate	Votes	%	±%
Liberal	Henry Campbell-Bannerman	Unopposed		
Registered electors		4,779		
Liberal hold				

=== Elections in the 1880s ===
General election 1880: Stirling Burghs
Party	Candidate	Votes	%	±%
Liberal	Henry Campbell-Bannerman	2,906	95.7	N/A
Conservative	James Gibson-Maitland	132	4.3	New
Majority		2,774	91.4	N/A
Turnout		3,038	63.2	N/A
Registered electors		4,807		
Liberal hold		Swing	N/A	

Campbell-Bannerman was appointed Chief Secretary to the Lord Lieutenant of Ireland, requiring a by-election.

By-election, 31 Oct 1884: Stirling Burghs
Party	Candidate	Votes	%	±%
Liberal	Henry Campbell-Bannerman	Unopposed		
Liberal hold				

== Election results 1885-1918 ==
Decades:	1880s; 1890s; 1900s; 1910s

=== Elections in the 1880s ===
General election 1885: Stirling Burghs
Party	Candidate	Votes	%	±%
Liberal	Henry Campbell-Bannerman	Unopposed		
Liberal hold				

A by-election was called after Campbell-Bannerman accepted office as Secretary of State for War as at that time Cabinet Ministers were required on appointment to submit themselves for re-election.

By-election, 10 Feb 1886: Stirling Burghs
Party	Candidate	Votes	%	±%
Liberal	Henry Campbell-Bannerman	Unopposed		
Liberal hold				

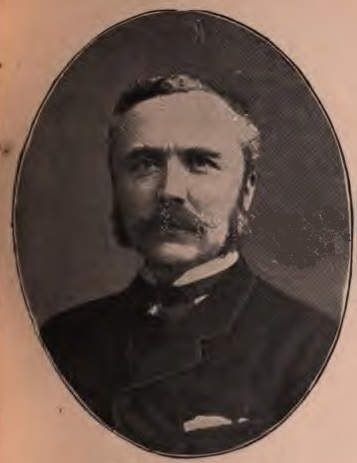
Campbell-Bannerman

General election 1886: Stirling Burghs
Party	Candidate	Votes	%	±%
Liberal	Henry Campbell-Bannerman	2,440	62.4	N/A
Liberal Unionist	John Pender	1,471	37.6	New
Majority		969	24.8	N/A
Turnout		3,911	74.8	N/A
Registered electors		5,228		
Liberal hold		Swing	N/A	

=== Elections in the 1890s ===
General election 1892: Stirling Burghs
Party	Candidate	Votes	%	±%
Liberal	Henry Campbell-Bannerman	2,791	62.2	−0.2
Liberal Unionist	Walter Hughes	1,695	37.8	+0.2
Majority		1,096	24.4	−0.4
Turnout		4,486	80.3	+5.5
Registered electors		5,590		
Liberal hold		Swing	-0.2	

Campbell-Bannerman was appointed Secretary of State for War requiring a by-election.

By-election, 25 Aug 1892: Stirling Burghs
Party	Candidate	Votes	%	±%
Liberal	Henry Campbell-Bannerman	Unopposed		
Liberal hold				

General election 1895: Stirling Burghs
Party	Candidate	Votes	%	±%
Liberal	Henry Campbell-Bannerman	2,783	62.7	+0.5
Conservative	Stuart Cunningham Macaskie	1,656	37.3	−0.5
Majority		1,127	25.4	+1.0
Turnout		4,439	73.9	−6.4
Registered electors		6,007		
Liberal hold		Swing	+0.5	

=== Elections in the 1900s ===
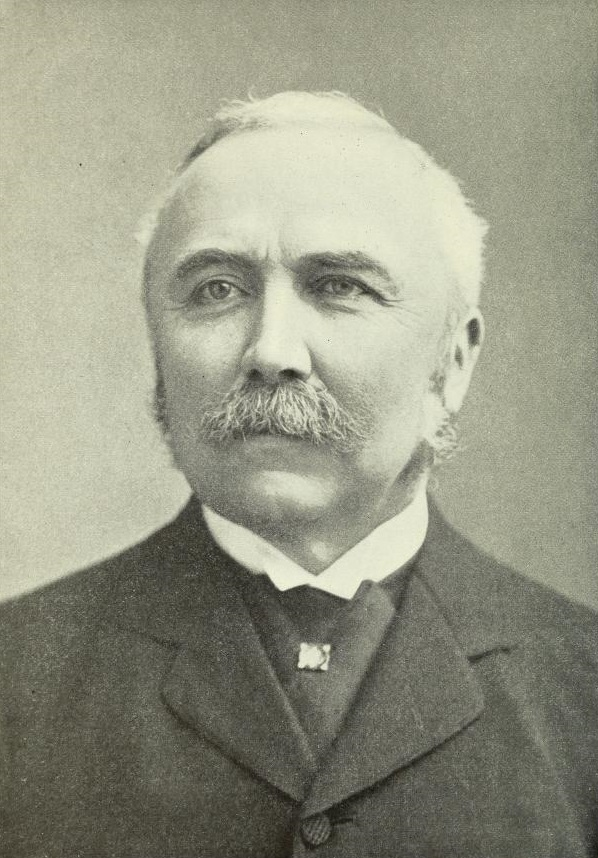
Campbell-Bannerman

General election 1900: Stirling Burghs
Party	Candidate	Votes	%	±%
Liberal	Henry Campbell-Bannerman	2,715	56.6	−6.1
Liberal Unionist	Oliver Thomas Duke	2,085	43.4	+6.1
Majority		630	12.2	−12.2
Turnout		4,800	74.7	+0.8
Registered electors		6,422		
Liberal hold		Swing	-6.1	

General election 1906: Stirling Burghs
Party	Candidate	Votes	%	±%
Liberal	Henry Campbell-Bannerman	Unopposed		
Liberal hold				

Ponsonby

1908 Stirling Burghs by-election
Party	Candidate	Votes	%	±%
Liberal	Arthur Ponsonby	3,873	60.7	N/A
Conservative	William Whitelaw	2,512	39.3	New
Majority		1,361	21.4	N/A
Turnout		6,385	84.5	N/A
Registered electors		7,558		
Liberal hold				

=== Elections in the 1910s ===
General election January 1910: Stirling Burghs
Party	Candidate	Votes	%	±%
Liberal	Arthur Ponsonby	4,471	64.9	+4.2
Conservative	Neil Cochran-Patrick	2,419	35.1	−4.2
Majority		2,052	29.8	+8.4
Turnout		6,890	84.6	+0.1
Registered electors				
Liberal hold		Swing	+4.2	

General election December 1910: Stirling Burghs
Party	Candidate	Votes	%	±%
Liberal	Arthur Ponsonby	Unopposed		
Liberal hold				

== See also ==
- Black Bond
- Stirling (UK Parliament constituency) (created 1983)

== Sources ==
- Leigh Rayment's Historical List of MPs – Constituencies beginning with "S" (part 5)

Parliament of the United Kingdom
Preceded by Manchester East	Constituency represented by the prime minister 1905–1908	Succeeded by Fife East
Preceded by Rutland	Constituency represented by the father of the House; 1907–1908	Succeeded by Honiton
