= Culross (Parliament of Scotland constituency) =

Constituency of the Old Parliament of Scotland

Culross in Perthshire (since 1889 in Fife) was a royal burgh that returned one commissioner to the Parliament of Scotland and to the Convention of Estates.

The Parliament of Scotland ceased to exist with the Act of Union 1707, and the commissioner for Culross, Sir David Dalrymple, was one of those co-opted to represent Scotland in the first Parliament of Great Britain. From the 1708 general election Culross, Dunfermline, Inverkeithing, Stirling, and Queensferry comprised the Stirling district of burghs, electing one Member of Parliament between them.

== List of burgh commissioners ==
- 1661–63, 1669–74, 1678 convention, 1685–1686: Sir Alexander Bruce of Broomhall
- 1665 convention: William Pearson, bailie
- 1667 convention: David Mitchell, bailie
- 1681–1682: George Wilson, dean of guild
- 1689 convention, 1689-1697: William Erskine of Torry (died 1700)
- 1697–1702, 1702-1707: Sir David Dalrymple, 1st Baronet

== See also ==
- List of constituencies in the Parliament of Scotland at the time of the Union
