= Gedge =

Gedge is a surname, and may refer to:

- David Gedge (born 1960), English musician
- David Patrick Gedge (1939–2016), British organist
- Edward Gedge (1895–1991), British modern pentathlete
- Henry Gedge, Scottish rugby union player
- Pauline Gedge (born 1945), Canadian novelist
- Peter Gedge (1910–1993), Scottish rugby union player
- Sydney Gedge (1829–1923), British politician
