= Dunfermline (Parliament of Scotland constituency) =

Constituency of the Parliament of Scotland (to 1707)

Dunfermline in Fife was a royal burgh that returned one commissioner to the Parliament of Scotland and to the Convention of Estates.

After the Acts of Union 1707, Dunfermline, Culross, Inverkeithing, Queensferry and Stirling formed the Stirling district of burghs, returning one member between them to the House of Commons of Great Britain.

== List of burgh commissioners ==
- 1661–63: James Mudie, bailie
- 1665 convention, 1667 convention, 1669–1774: Peter Walker, provost
- 1678 convention: John Anderson, merchant, bailie
- 1681–82: Andrew Belfrage, bailie
- 1685–86: Sir Patrick Murray
- 1689 convention, 1689–97: Sir Charles Halkett of Pitfirrane (died 1697)
- 1697: Sir Patrick Aikenhead (died c.1698)
- 1699–1701: Jomes Hamiltoun
- 1702–05: Sir James Halkett of Pitfirrane (died 1705)
- 1705–07: Sir Peter Halkett of Pitfirrane

== See also ==
- List of constituencies in the Parliament of Scotland at the time of the Union
