= John Short (Scottish politician) =

John Short, of Glenfalloch, was a Scottish politician.

== Biography ==
He was provost of Stirling from 1644 to 1647 and from 1649 to 1652, and represented the burgh in Parliament from 1646 to 1647 and from 1648 to 1651, and at Conventions of Burghs in 1649 and 1650. He died in 1652.
