= Inverkeithing (Parliament of Scotland constituency) =

Constituency of the Old Parliament of Scotland

Inverkeithing in Fife was a royal burgh that returned one commissioner to the Parliament of Scotland and to the Convention of Estates.

After the Acts of Union 1707, Inverkeithing, Culross, Dunfermline, Queensferry and Stirling formed the Stirling district of burghs, returning one member between them to the House of Commons of Great Britain.

== List of burgh commissioners ==
- 1661–63: Thomas Thomson. bailie
- 1665 convention: not represented
- 1667 convention, 1669–74, 1678 convention: Captain James Bennett, merchant
- 1681–82, 1685–86: John Dempster of Pitliver, provost
- 1689 convention, 1689–95: Alexander Spittell of Lewquhat (died c.1696)
- 1696–1701, 1702–07: James Spittell, son of above, provost

== See also ==
- List of constituencies in the Parliament of Scotland at the time of the Union
