= Georgina Gollock =

Irish missionary and writer

Georgina Anne Gollock (1861 – 1940) was an Irish-born missionary, author and editor, "one of the unsung heroes of the ecumenical movement". Gollock became interested in African education after the Phelpes Stokes investigations, and with her friend James Aggrey was committed "to propagating a kind of Christian pan-Africanism".

== Life ==
Georgina Gollock was born at Kinsale, County Cork on 26 May 1861. In 1890 she began working for the Church Missionary Society, working as an editorial assistant to Eugene Stock.

A "woman of vigorous personality, wide knowledge and sound judgement", in 1920 Gollock became associate editor, and in 1921 co-editor with J. H. Oldham, of the quarterly journal International Review of Missions. She continued co-editing the journal until February 1927. "To her is owed much of the credit for what the International Review of Missions became".

Gollock was also Secretary of the Board of Study for the Preparation of Missionaries.

== Works ==
- Candidates-in-waiting : a manual of home preparation for foreign missionary work, 1892
- What's o'clock? : a missionary book for boys and girls, 1893, With a preface by William Walsh, Bishop of Ossory.
- A winter's mails from Ceylon, India and Egypt: being journal letters written home, 1895
- Missionaries at work, 1898
- An introduction to missionary service, 1921
- Sons of Africa, 1928
- Lives of eminent Africans, 1928
- Eugene Stock: a biographical study, 1836 to 1928, 1929
- At the sign of the Flying Angel : a book of the sailor at the coastline, 1930
- Heroes of health, 1930
- Daughters of Africa, 1932
