= Frederick Pennington =

English merchant and politician

Frederick Pennington (7 March 1819 – 11 May 1914) was an English merchant and Liberal politician who sat in the House of Commons from 1874 to 1885.

== Life ==
Pennington was the son of John Pennington, cotton spinner and merchant of Hindley, Lancashire and Elizabeth, daughter of John Hargreaves of Westhoughton. He was educated at Dr Formby's school at Southport and in Paris from 1830 to 1832. After many years working as an East India Company merchant, he retired from business in 1865. He was a J.P. for Surrey.

Pennington was a member of the council of the Anti-Corn Law League which he supported generously. He was an advanced Liberal, part of the relatively radical Liberal group, championing free trade, the end to church-state mixed local administration and mass production.

In 1868, Pennington stood for parliament unsuccessfully at West Surrey. At the 1874 general election he was elected member of parliament for Stockport. He held the seat, through an era of the same representation elections, until standing down for the 1885 election.

Pennington lived at Broome Hall, Holmwood on the southern slopes of the Greensand Ridge, Surrey where the weekend gatherings included many eminent guests from the worlds of politics, art and literature.

Pennington married in 1854 Margaret Landell Sharpe, daughter of Rev. John Sharpe, Vicar of Doncaster. She was heavily involved in the women's movement and a campaigner for emancipation and suffrage. One of Pennington's sisters married Thomas Thomasson. He died, aged 95, survived by his widow at his London home or rental, 17 Hyde Park Terrace. His probate was sworn in 1914 at £197,829 (equivalent to about £19,700,000 in 2025).

Parliament of the United Kingdom
Preceded by William Tipping; John Benjamin Smith	Member of Parliament for Stockport; 1874–1885; With: Charles Henry Hopwood	Succeeded by Louis John Jennings; William Tipping
