= Stirling (Parliament of Scotland constituency) =

Constituency of the Old Parliament of Scotland in Stirling, Scotland

Stirling in Stirlingshire was a royal burgh that returned one commissioner to the Parliament of Scotland and to the Convention of Estates.

The Parliament of Scotland ceased to exist with the Act of Union 1707, and the commissioner for Stirling, John Erskine, was one of those co-opted to represent Scotland in the first Parliament of Great Britain. From the 1708 general election Culross, Dunfermline, Inverkeithing, Stirling and Queensferry comprised the Stirling district of burghs, electing one Member of Parliament between them.

== List of burgh commissioners ==
- 1474: James Shaw of Sauchie
- 1572 convention: James Shaw
- 1612: John Sherar
- 1612, 1617 convention, 1617: John Williamson, town clerk
- 1621: Duncan Paterson
- 1625 convention: John Cowan
- 1628–33, 1630 convention, 1639–41, 1643–44, 1644–46, 1648: Thomas Bruce, provost
- 1646–47, 1648–51: John Shorte, sometime provost
- 1651: John Cowan
- 1661–63, 1665 convention: Duncan Nairn, provost
- 1667 convention: James Steinston
- 1669–74: James Stevenson, provost
- 1678 convention, 1681–82: Robert Russell, provost
- 1685–86: John McCulloch, provost
- 1689 convention, 1689–90: Hugh Kennedy of Schelloch (died c.1690)
- 1693–95: John Dick (expelled 1695 for menaces)
- 1696–97: Patrick Thompson, treasurer of Edinburgh (died 1698)
- 1697–1702: Francis Napier of Craigannet, provost
- 1702–07: John Erskine

== See also ==
- List of constituencies in the Parliament of Scotland at the time of the Union
