= John Benjamin Smith =

English Liberal Party politician

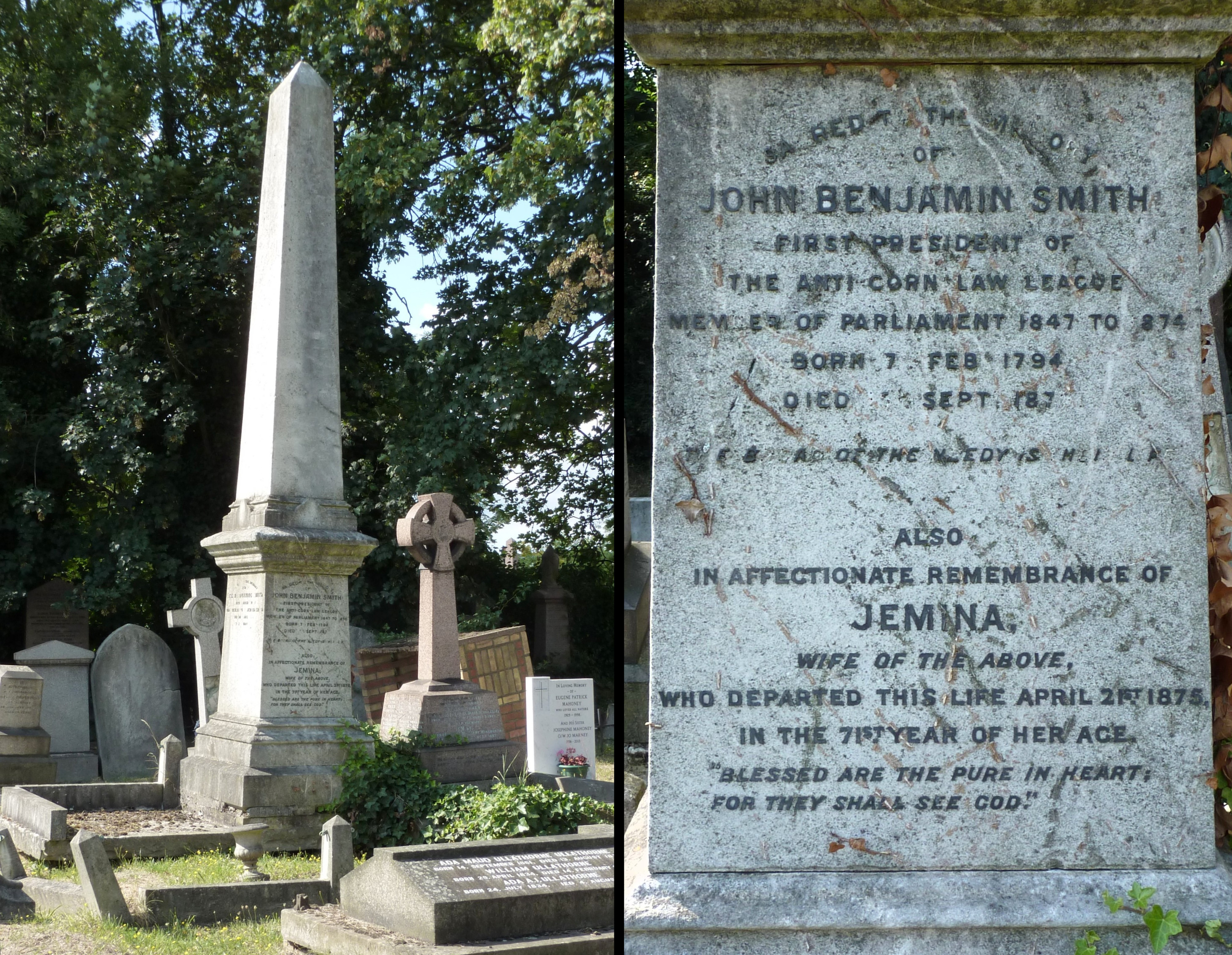
John Benjamin Smith's funerary monument at Kensal Green Cemetery, London, photographed in 2014

John Benjamin Smith (7 February 1794 – 15 September 1879) was an English Liberal Party politician who sat in the House of Commons from 1847 to 1874.

== Life ==
Smith was the son of Benjamin Smith, a merchant of Manchester. He was himself a merchant and was president of the Manchester Chamber of Commerce from 1839 to 1841. He was the first chairman of the Anti-Corn Law League. He was a Justice of the Peace for Lancashire and author of several economics works.

Smith stood unsuccessfully for parliament at Blackburn in 1837, and at Walsall and Dundee in 1841. In 1847 he was elected Member of Parliament for Stirling Burghs and held the seat until July 1852. He was then elected MP for Stockport and held the seat until 1874.

Smith lived at King's Ride, Ascot, Berkshire where he died aged 85.

In 1841 Smith married Jemina Durning, eldest daughter of William Durning, from a wealthy well-established Liverpool family. Before her marriage, she had lived with her sister Emma and her husband George Holt, parents of the merchant of that name.

John Benjamin Smith is buried at Kensal Green Cemetery, London.

== Daughters and legacy ==
The Smiths had two daughters, Jemina and Edith Jane.

Edith Jane Smith married a lawyer named Edwin Lawrence, the Baconian enthusiast, two of whose elder brothers, William and James, both served as Liberal MPs and Lord mayors of London. Edwin changed his name to Edwin Durning-Lawrence before receiving his baronethood. The Lawrence family was closely connected to Unitarianism, for example purchasing land for the move of the Essex Street Chapel.

The other daughter, Jemina Durning Smith, founded the local library, known as the Ascot Durning Library, which (as of 2011) was still supported by the Durning Trust. She also co-founded the Durning Library in Lambeth, south London, with her brother-in-law Edwin as one of the commissioners and another brother-in-law, James, to open it A plaque to her hangs on the wall of the "Arts & Crafts masterpiece" that opened in Kennington in 1889.

== Publications ==
- A reply to the letter of Samuel Jones Lloyd, Esq., on the effect of the administration of the Bank of England 1840 (see Samuel Jones-Loyd, 1st Baron Overstone)
- How to obtain increased supplies of Cotton 1855
- An Inquiry into the causes of Panics and of the frequent Fluctuations in the rate of Discount 1866

Parliament of the United Kingdom
Preceded by Lord Dalmeny	Member of Parliament for Stirling Burghs; 1847–1852	Succeeded by James Anderson
Preceded by James Heald; James Kershaw	Member of Parliament for Stockport; 1852–1874; With: James Kershaw to 1864; Edward William Watkin 1864–1868; William Tipping 1868–1874	Succeeded by Frederick Pennington; Charles Henry Hopwood
