= William Tipping =

English railway magnate and Conservative politician

Member of Parliament for Stockport
- In office 1868–1874
- Preceded by: John Benjamin Smith; Edward Watkin
- Succeeded by: Charles Henry Hopwood; Frederick Pennington
- In office 1885–1886
- Preceded by: Charles Henry Hopwood; Frederick Pennington
- Succeeded by: Louis John Jennings; Sydney Gedge

Personal details
- Born: 1816 Liverpool, Lancashire, England, United Kingdom
- Died: 16 January 1897 (aged 80) Brasted, Kent, England, United Kingdom
- Party: Conservative

William Tipping JP MP JSA (1816 – 16 January 1897) was an English railway magnate and Conservative politician.

Tipping was born in Liverpool to John Tipping, a Quaker corn merchant. William Tipping was educated at a private school in Tottenham. During his twenties he travelled into Palestine making drawings of archaeological sites, some of which were published in Punch; he was elected to the Society of Antiquaries as a result. He became a director of the London and North Western Railway and in 1857 purchased Brasted Park, at Brasted, Kent, where he helped restore dilapidated cottages, paid for the widening of local roads, and supported local community institutions.

He was persuaded by friends to stand for Parliament. At the 1868 general election, Tipping was elected as Member of Parliament (MP) for Stockport with 4,498 votes, but he lost the seat at the 1874 general election. He was re-elected for Stockport in 1885, but did not defend his seat at the 1886 general election.

By 1876 he was director of 13 railway companies; one of his responsibilities was to arrange the travel of the royal family. He was also appointed J. P. for Kent, Lancashire, and West Riding of Yorkshire.

Tipping married Maria Walker, the daughter of a Quaker flax mill owner from Leeds, in 1844. They had four sons: John Walker Tipping (1845-1876), William Fearon Tipping (1847-1911), who became a Colonel in the Royal Welch Fusiliers, a justice of the peace and High Sheriff of Kent, Edward Alexander Tipping (1852-1871), and Henry Avray Tipping (1855-1933), who became a noted writer on country houses and gardens, a garden designer, and Architectural Editor of Country Life magazine for 17 years.

Tipping died at the age of 80 on 16 January 1897 and was buried at the parish church in Brasted.

Parliament of the United Kingdom
Preceded by John Benjamin Smith; Edward Watkin	Member of Parliament for Stockport; 1868–1874; With: John Benjamin Smith	Succeeded by Charles Henry Hopwood; Frederick Pennington
Preceded by Charles Henry Hopwood; Frederick Pennington	Member of Parliament for Stockport; 1885–1886; With: Louis John Jennings	Succeeded by Louis John Jennings; Sydney Gedge
