= Charles Henry Hopwood =

British politician and judge (1829–1904)

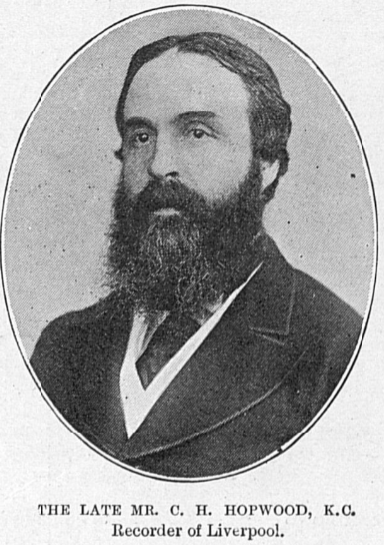
- Born: 20 July 1829; London
- Died: 14 October 1904 (aged 75); Hampstead
- Occupation: Politician

Charles Henry Hopwood KC (20 July 1829 – 14 October 1904) was a British Liberal politician and judge.

== Career ==
Hopwood was born on 20 July 1829. He was educated at King's College School and at King's College London. He was admitted to the Middle Temple on 2 November 1850 and was Called to the Bar on 6 June 1853. He served as Liberal Member of Parliament for Stockport from 1874 to 1885, and as Liberal MP for Middleton from 1892 to 1895.

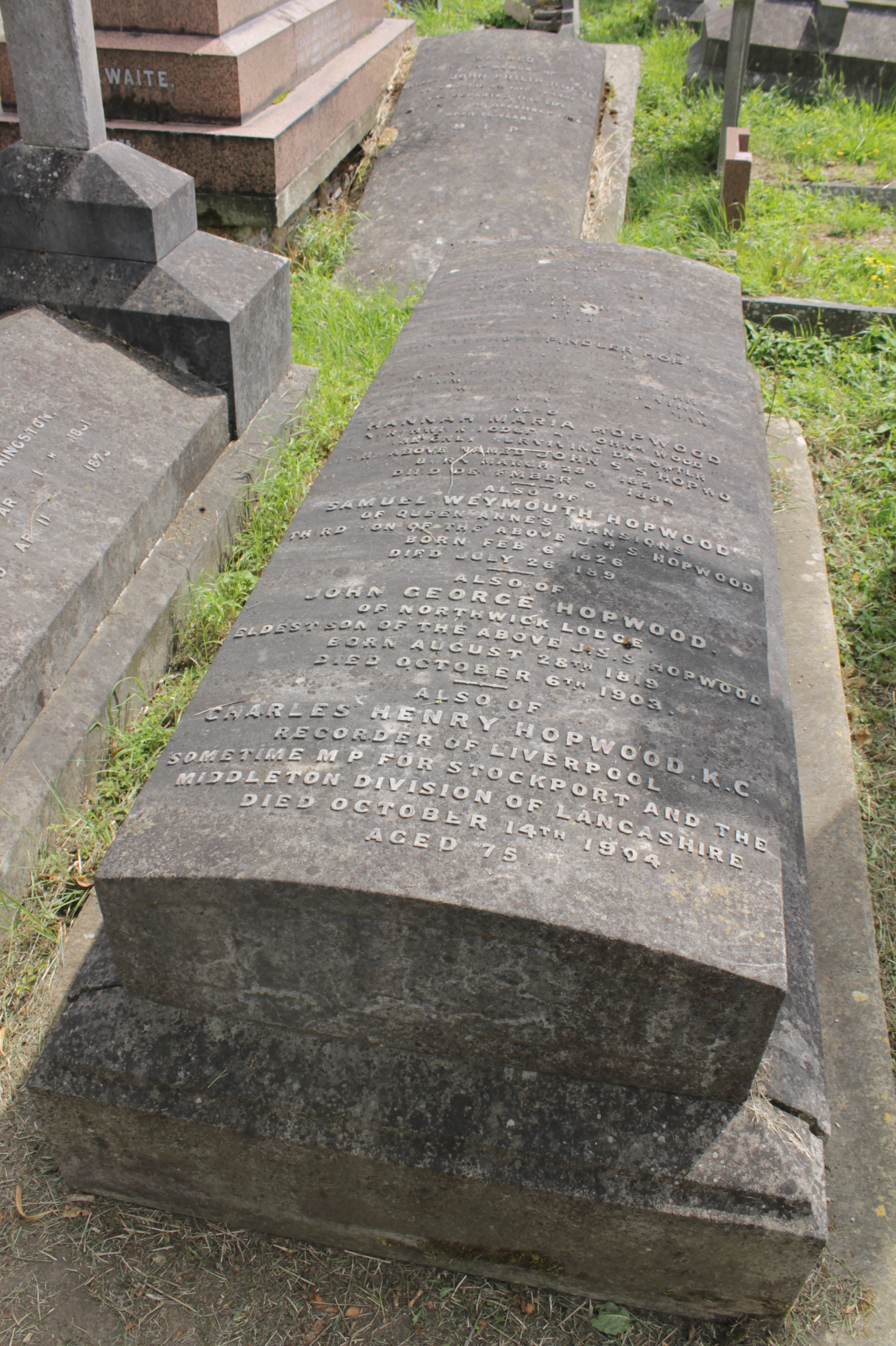
The grave of Charles Henry Hopwood, Kensal Green Cemetery

Hopwood became QC in 1874. He was appointed Recorder of Liverpool in 1886. In politics he supported Irish Home Rule.

Hopwood gave a lecture to the Humanitarian League on prison reform but did not join the League as a member. His lecture was published by the League as A Plea for Mercy to Offenders in 1894. He was an anti-vaccinationist.

Hopwood died at Hampstead. He is buried with other family members in Kensal Green Cemetery. The grave lies on a central path, west of the central building structure.

== Selected publications ==
- Speeches of Mr. P. A. Taylor and Mr. C. H. Hopwood on Vaccination: In the House of Commons (1883)
- A Plea for Mercy to Offenders (Humanitarian League, 1894)

Parliament of the United Kingdom
Preceded by William Tipping; John Benjamin Smith	Member of Parliament for Stockport; 1874–1885; With: Frederick Pennington	Succeeded by Louis John Jennings; William Tipping
Preceded by Thomas Fielden	Member of Parliament for Middleton; 1892–1895	Succeeded by Thomas Fielden
