= James Caird (politician) =

Scottish agriculturist, agricultural writer and politician (1816 – 1892)

The Right Honourable Sir James Caird KCB FRS
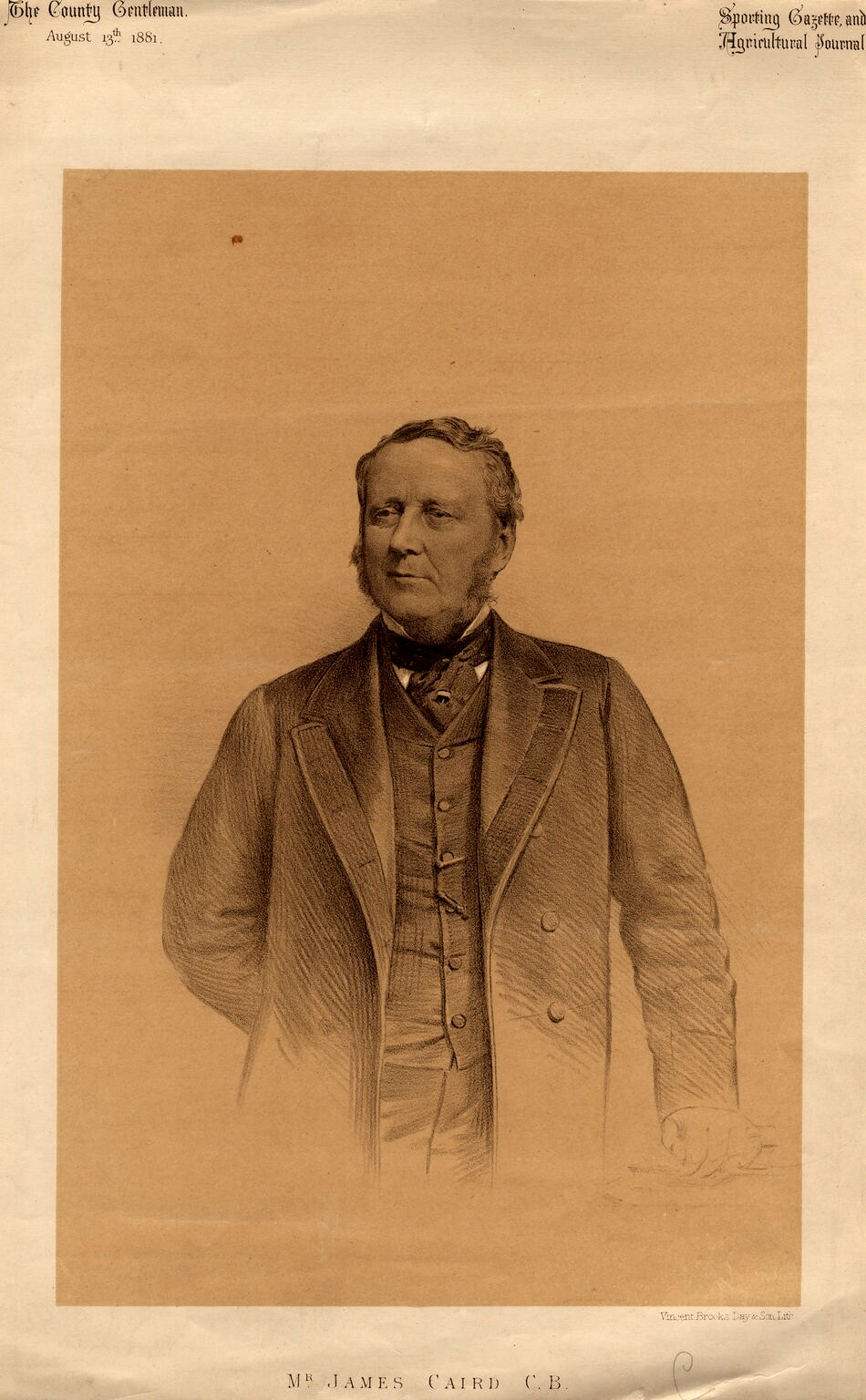
- James Caird
- Born: July 1816
- Died: February 1892 (aged 75)
- Occupation: agriculturist

Sir James Caird KCB PC FRS (10 July 1816 – 9 February 1892) was a Scottish agriculturist, agricultural writer and politician. His views were based on economic liberalism which led to him forming an advisory relationship to Sir Robert Peel and later under Benjamin Disraeli. He examined the Irish famine and still later served on the commission to examine the famines in India.

== Life ==
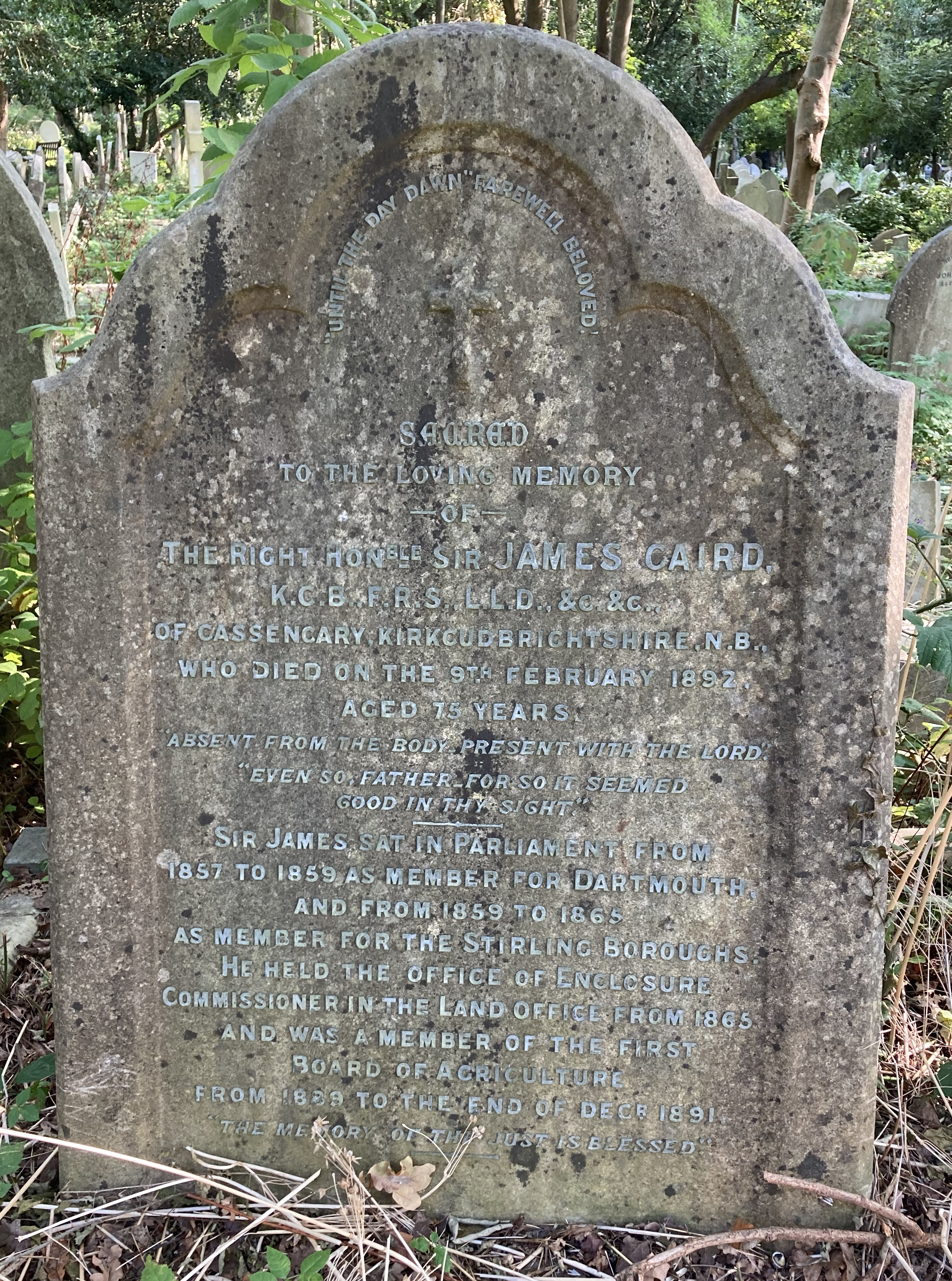
Grave of Sir James Caird in Highgate Cemetery

Born at Stranraer, the son of James Caird and Isabella McNeil, Caird was educated at Edinburgh High School and University of Edinburgh. He was Member of Parliament for Dartmouth from 1857 to 1859 and for Stirling Burghs from 1859 to 1865.

He started as a progressive farmer at Baldoon and then became a land-owner at Kirkcudbrightshire. He grew to become a voice of the free-trade farmer and thus represented economic liberalism of the period. In 1849, he wrote High Farming as the best Substitute for Protection. The work caught the attention of the Conservative Prime Minister, Sir Robert Peel, who saw Caird as a well-informed commentator. Peel invited Caird to examine agriculture and the famine in Ireland. Caird subsequently represented the "Peelite" position on economics and famine relief. In 1850 he wrote The Plantation Scheme: Or, the West of Ireland as a Field of Investment. He toured America, and Canada.

He was appointed a Fellow of the Royal Society in 1865 and President of the Royal Statistical Society in 1880-1882 and was made a Privy Counsellor in 1889. Caird travelled to India from October 1878 to join a commission of famine inspectors. He held opinions that the Indian administrators did not appreciate. He was of the opinion that famine relief should be aimed to save life and was against fitness tests and wage payment against work for Indians. He believed that Indian governance needed fundamental change with peasants receiving payment in kind with handling of harvest variability. He even considered that land revenue superstructure including the Indian Civil Services needed pruning or even abolition. He was senior member of the Land Commission in 1882. He was director of the land department of the Board of Agriculture from 1889 to 1891.

He was appointed a CB in 1869 and promoted to KCB in 1882.

He died on 9 February 1892 and was buried on the eastern side of Highgate Cemetery.

== Family ==
In 1865 he married Elizabeth Jane Dudgeon (1826-1899), daughter of Robert Dudgeon of Hastings. She is buried alongside her husband.

== Works ==
- English Agriculture in 1850-51 (London, 1852)
- The Plantation Scheme; Or, the West of Ireland as a Field of Investment (Edinburgh, 1850)
- Caird, James (1878). The Landed Interest and the Supply of Food (1 ed.). London, Paris & New York: Cassell, Petter & Galpin. via Internet Archive

== Notes ==
Parliament of the United Kingdom
Preceded by Sir Thomas Herbert	Member of Parliament for Dartmouth; 1857–1859	Succeeded by Edward Wyndham Harrington Schenley
Preceded by Sir James Anderson	Member of Parliament for Stirling Burghs; 1859–1865	Succeeded by Laurence Oliphant
