= James Anderson (British politician) =

British politician and manufacturer

Sir James Anderson
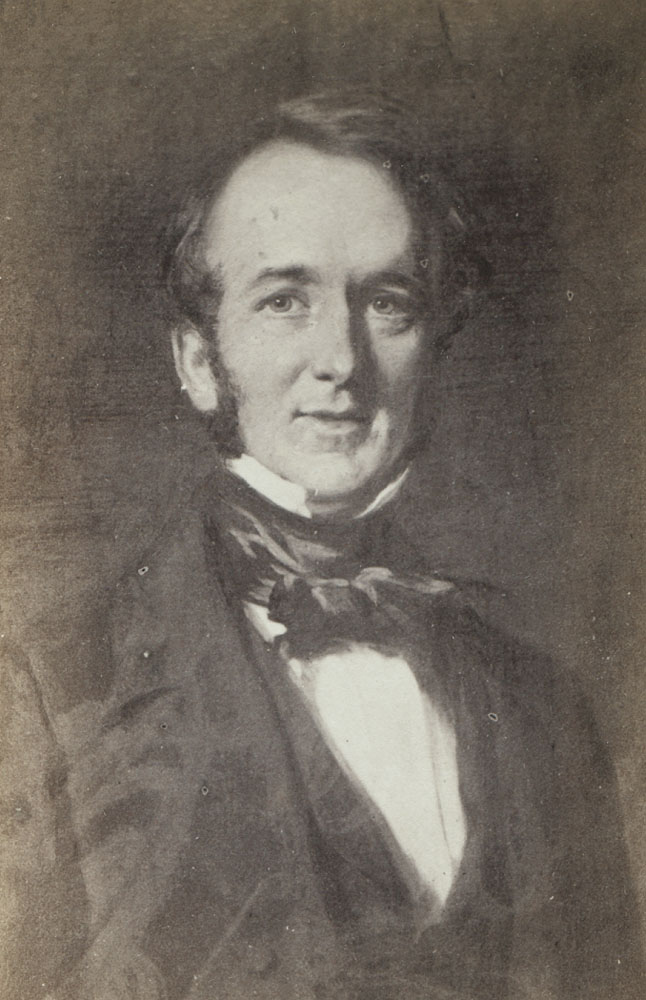

Member of Parliament (United Kingdom)
- Monarch: Queen Victoria

Personal details
- Born: 1800 Stirling
- Died: 1864 (aged 63–64) Blairvadach

Sir James Anderson (28 November 1800 – 8 May 1864) was a British politician and manufacturer.

Born at Stirling, he was the son of the merchant John Anderson and his wife Christian Wright. Aged fifteen, he moved to Glasgow to accompany his older brother David. Working in a manufactory, he rose through the city's civic dignities.

Anderson served as a Councillor from 1841 to 1854 and was appointed Lord Provost of Glasgow in 1848 and was created a Knight Bachelor on Queen Victoria's visit in the following year. He held this post until 1851 and entered the British House of Commons in the next year, sitting for Stirling Burghs until 1859.

In 1850 he was living at 3 Blythswood Square.

He married Janet, the only daughter and heiress of Robert Hood, a fellow Bailie of Glasgow Council. The couple had three sons and a daughter. Anderson died, aged 63, at his mansion in Blairvadack in Dunbartonshire.

Honorary titles
Preceded by Alexander Hastie	Lord Provost of Glasgow; 1848–1851	Succeeded by Robert Stewart
Parliament of the United Kingdom
Preceded by John Benjamin Smith	Member of Parliament for Stirling Burghs; 1852–1859	Succeeded by James Caird
