= Laurence Oliphant (author) =

British politician and writer (1829–1888)

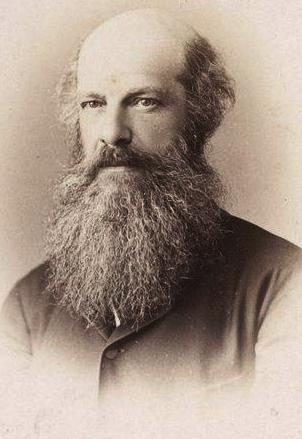
- Born: 3 August 1829; Cape Town, Cape Colony
- Died: 23 December 1888 (aged 59); York House, Twickenham, London, England, United Kingdom
- Occupations: Author; Traveller; Diplomat; Intelligence agent Member of Parliament
- Spouse(s): Alice le Strange Oliphant (1872–1886); Rosamond Oliphant (1888)

Laurence Oliphant (3 August 1829 – 23 December 1888), a Member of Parliament, was a South African-born British author, traveller, diplomat, British intelligence agent, Christian mystic, and Christian Zionist. His best known book in his lifetime was a satirical novel, Piccadilly (1870). More heed has gone since to his plan for Jewish farming communities in the Holy Land, The Land of Gilead. Oliphant was a UK Member of Parliament for Stirling Burghs.

== Early life ==
Laurence Oliphant was born in Cape Town, Cape Colony, the only child of Sir Anthony Oliphant (1793–1859), a member of the Scottish landed gentry, and his wife Maria. At the time of his son's birth Sir Anthony was Attorney General of the Cape Colony, but he was soon appointed Chief Justice in Ceylon. Laurence spent his early childhood in Colombo, where his father purchased a home called Alcove in Captains Gardens, subsequently known as Maha Nuge Gardens. Sir Anthony and his son have been credited with bringing tea to Ceylon and growing 30 tea plants brought over from China on the Oliphant Estate in Nuwara Eliya. In 1848 and 1849, he and his parents toured Europe. In 1851, he accompanied Jung Bahadur from Colombo to Nepal, which provided the material for his first book, A Journey to Katmandu (1852). Oliphant returned to Ceylon and from there went to England to study law. Oliphant left his legal studies to travel in Russia. The outcome of that tour was his book The Russian Shores of the Black Sea (1853).

Oliphant's parents were Christian Zionists.

== Diplomatic and utopian pursuits ==
Between 1853 and 1861 Oliphant was secretary to Lord Elgin during the negotiation of the Canada Reciprocity Treaty in Washington, D.C. and companion to the Duke of Newcastle on a visit to the Circassian coast during the Crimean War.

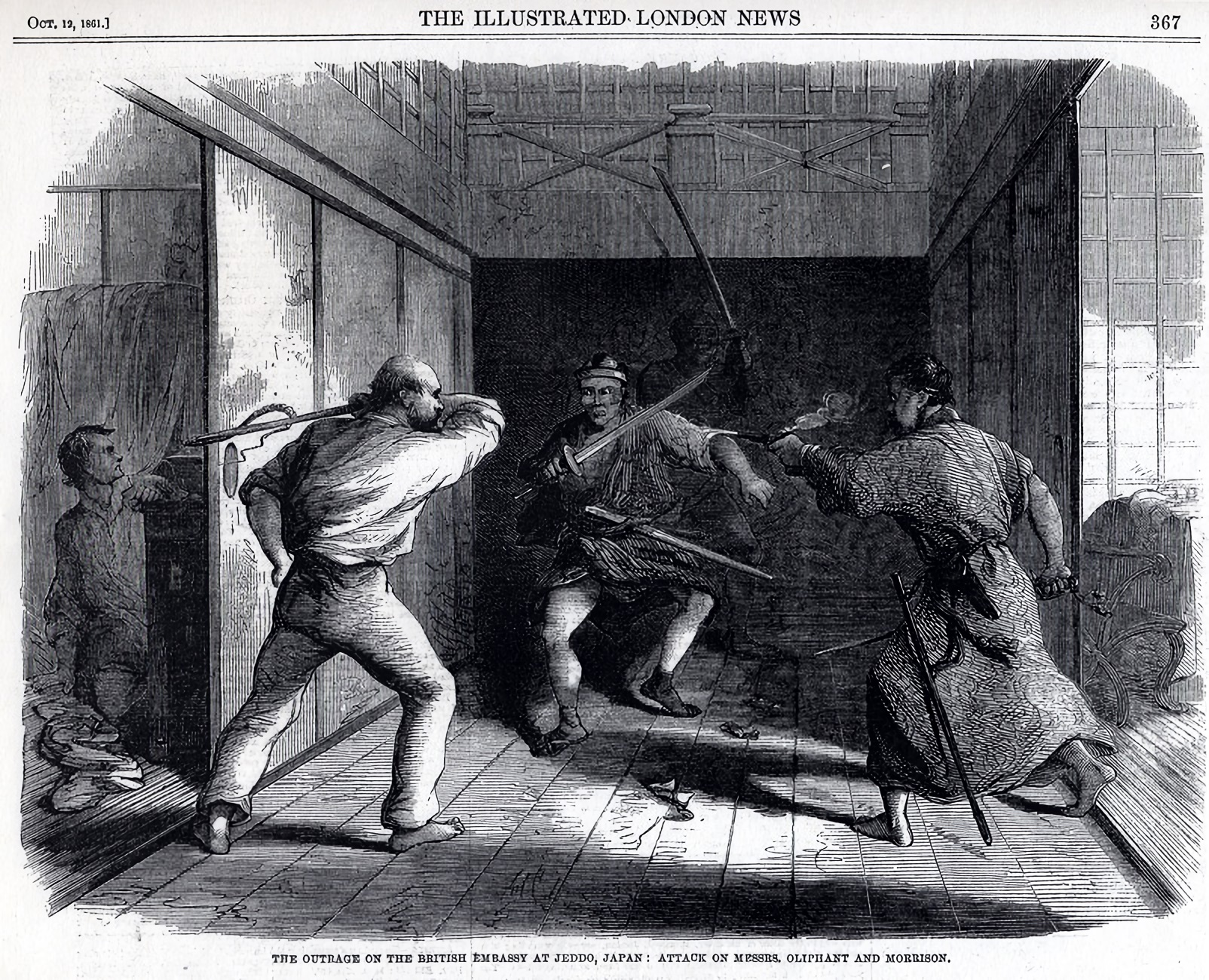
Attack of the British legation in Tōzen-ji, Edo, in 1861

In 1861, Oliphant was appointed First Secretary of the British Legation in Japan under Minister Plenipotentiary (later Sir) Rutherford Alcock. He arrived in Edo at the end of June, but on the evening of 5 July, a night-time attack was made on the legation by xenophobic ronin. His pistols having been locked in their travelling box, Oliphant rushed out with a hunting whip, and was attacked by a ronin with a heavy two-handed sword. A beam, invisible in the darkness, interfered with the blows, but Oliphant was severely wounded and sent on board ship to recover. He had to return to England after a visit to Tsushima Island, where he discovered a Russian force occupying a secluded bay and obtained its withdrawal. The attack on the legation left him with permanent damage to one of his hands.

He was sent to Poland in 1863 as a British observer to report on the January Uprising.

At the end of 1863, Oliphant was a guest of Christian August, Duke of Augustenburg at his castle in Primkenau, Lower Silesia, when news arrived of the death of King Frederick VII of Denmark. Anticipating political tensions, Oliphant then went to Schleswig, where he witnessed the outbreak of the Second Schleswig War and the Battle of Mysunde on February 2, 1864.

Oliphant returned to England, resigned from the Diplomatic Service and was elected to Parliament in 1865 for Stirling Burghs. While he did not show any conspicuous parliamentary ability, he was made a great success by his novel Piccadilly: A Fragment of Contemporary Biography (1870). Oliphant's later novels include Altiora Peto (1883) and Masollam: A Problem of the Period (1886).

He then became connected to the spiritualist prophet Thomas Lake Harris, who, in about 1861, had organised a small Christian utopian community, the Brotherhood of the New Life, which was settled in Brocton, New York, on Lake Erie, and he subsequently moved to Santa Rosa, California.

After initially being refused permission to join Harris in 1867, he was eventually allowed to join his community, and Oliphant caused a scandal by leaving Parliament in 1868 to follow Harris to Brocton. He lived there for several years engaged in what Harris termed the 'Use', manual labour aimed at forwarding his utopian vision. Members of the community were allowed to return to the outside world from time to time to earn money for the community. After three years, Oliphant worked as correspondent for The Times during the Franco-German War, and afterwards spent several years in Paris in the service of the paper. There he met, through his mother, his future wife, Alice le Strange. They married at St George's, Hanover Square, London, on 8 June 1872. In 1873, Oliphant went back to Brocton with his wife and mother.

Later, he and his mother had a falling out with Harris and demanded their money back, which had allegedly been derived mainly from the sale of Lady Maris Oliphant's jewels. That forced Harris to sell the Brocton colony, and his remaining disciples moved to their new colony in Santa Rosa, California.

In 1876 Oliphant returned to England while his wife, Alice, chose to remain with the Brotherhood of the New Life in Brocton.

By 1878 Oliphant, caught up in a wave of Western concern that Russia intended to conquer the Middle East, devised a "Plan for Gilead" under which Britain would plant a Jewish agricultural colony "in the northern and more fertile half of Palestine" and enlisted the approval of Prime Minister Disraeli, a supporter of Zionism; Foreign Minister Salisbury, the Prince of Wales; and the novelist George Eliot. Oliphant, credentialed by the British government, set sail in 1879 to investigate conditions for establishing a Jewish agricultural settlement in Palestine. Oliphant would later come to see Jewish agricultural settlements as a means of alleviating Jewish suffering in Eastern Europe.

In May 1879, Oliphant was in Istanbul in the Ottoman Empire, petitioning the Sublime Porte for permission to establish a Jewish agricultural colony in the Holy Land and settling large numbers of Jews there (this was prior to the first wave of Jewish settlement by Zionists in 1882). He did not see it as an impossible task in view of the large numbers of Christian believers in the United States and England who supported that plan. With financial support from Christadelphians and others in Britain, Oliphant amassed sufficient funding to purchase land and settle Jewish refugees in the Galilee. Rev. Haskett Smith was an able acolyte.

While awaiting an appointment with the Sublime Porte, Oliphant traveled to Romania to discuss his proposed agricultural settlements with the Jewish communities there.

The long-awaited meeting with the Sublime Porte finally took place in April 1880, and Oliphant's plan was dismissed. In the opinion of Henry Layard, British Ambassador to the Sublime Porte at the time of Oliphant's visit, the effort failed because Oliphant spoke about how the return of the Jews to Palestine would bring the second coming of Jesus – language and ideas that the Sultan found uncongenial.

When a wave of pogroms swept the Russian Empire in 1881, most notably the Kiev pogrom, charitable funds were raised in London under the aegis of the Mansion House Committee, a group created for the purpose. When the committee announced that the funds would be used to help the Jewish refugees resettle in America, Oliphant published an article in The Times on 15 February 1881, asserting that Jews who chose to settle in Palestine would have their religion safeguarded; his article met with such enthusiasm among Polish and Russian Jews that the Mansion House Committee appointed him commissioner to Galicia. Oliphant and his wife, Alice, who had reunited in 1882, traveled to Vienna and Galicia, meeting with representatives of Eastern Jews and promising that "as soon as your Christian sympathizers in England are convinced the Jews fleeing from Russia can settle with safety in the land of their ancestors, then they will contribute thousands, I may well say, hundreds of thousands of pounds to promote this great object."

Oliphant had by this point become something of a celebrity among Jews in Eastern Europe. He was spoken of as "another Cyrus" and a "saviour". His settlement plans were published by the early Zionist newspaper Hamagid, written up by Peretz Smolenskin in Ha-Shaḥar, and Moses Lilienblum expressed the hope that Oliphant would be "the Messiah for Israel." According to historian Nathan Michael Gelber, "you could find in the houses of poor Jews a picture of Oliphant. It would be hung right next to the pictures of the great philanthropists Moses Montefiore and Baron Hirsch."

Despite the fact that the Sublime Porte had given no permission for the building of Jewish agricultural settlements, in May 1882 the Oliphants began a journey to Palestine, traveling through Budapest to Moldave, where they paused to meet Rabbi Avrohom Yaakov Friedman whom Oliphant understood to be "the leader of world Jewry", hoping to persuade him to raise sufficient funds to purchase Palestine from the Ottoman Emperor.

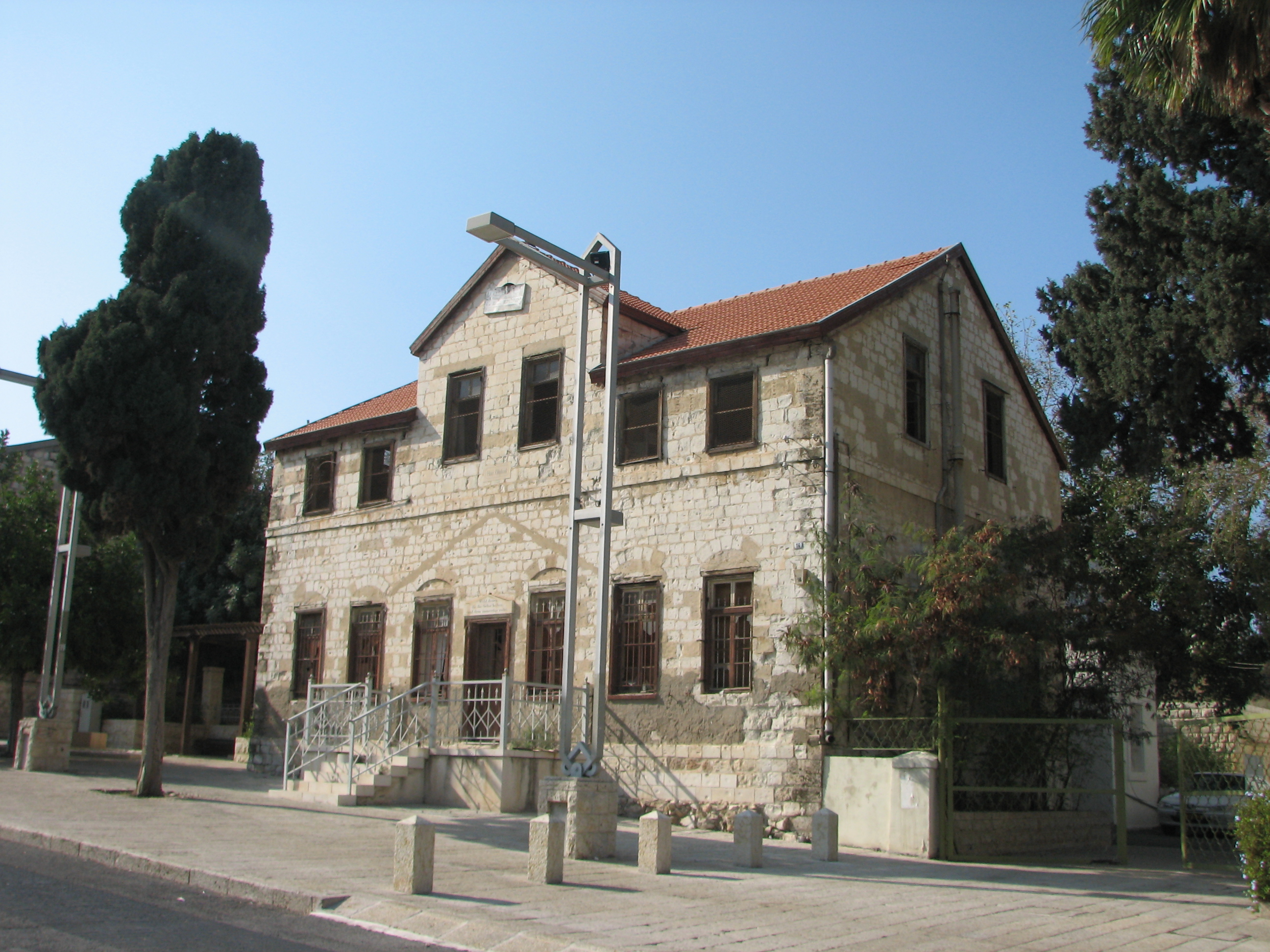
Oliphant House in Haifa

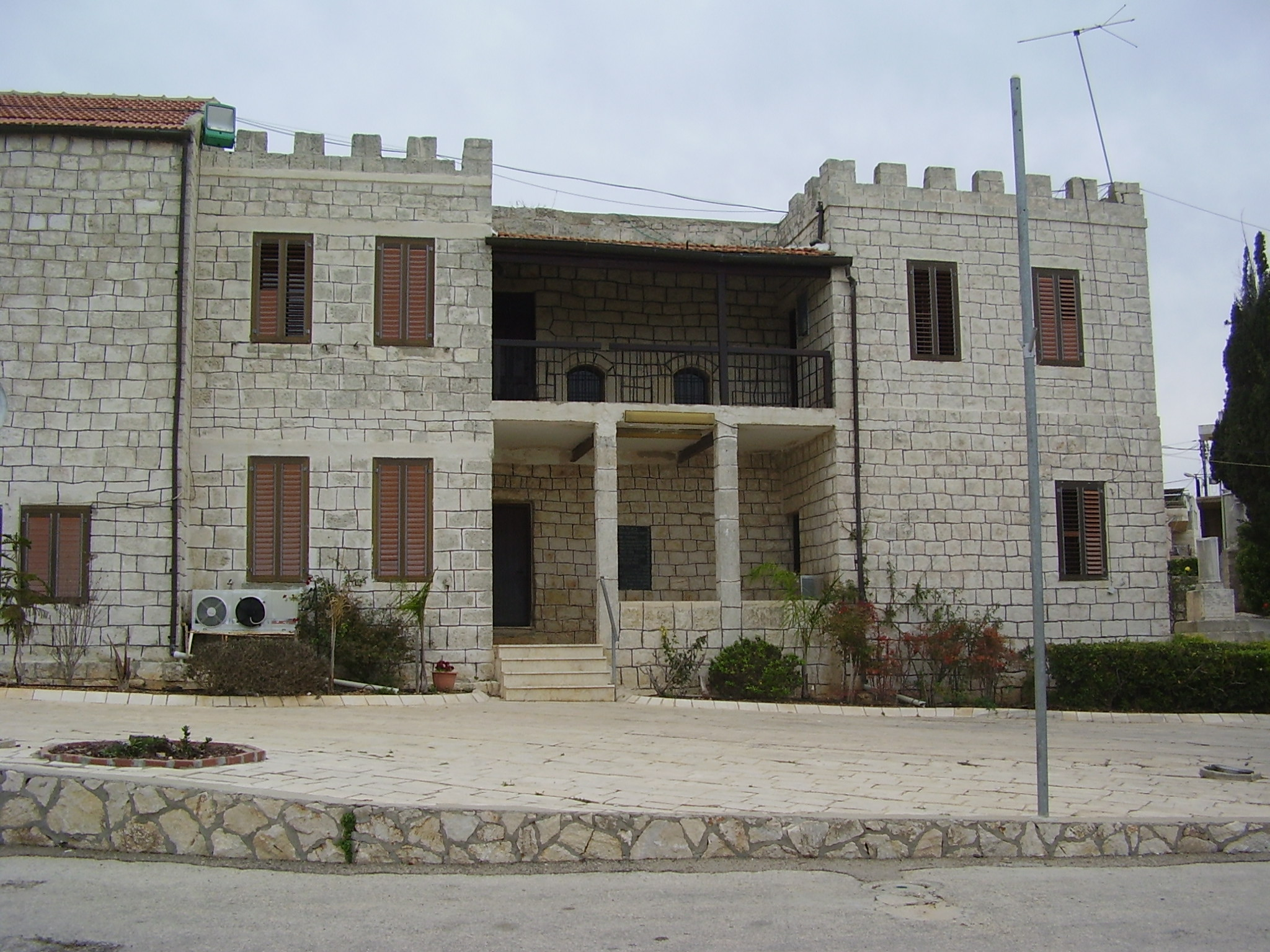
Oliphant House in Daliyat al-Karmel

The Oliphants settled in Palestine, dividing their time between a house in the German Colony in Haifa, and another in the Druze village of Daliyat al-Karmel on Mount Carmel. Oliphant's secretary Naftali Herz Imber, author of the Israeli national anthem, Hatikva, lived with them. In the Holy Land, they were in touch with the Jewish pioneers of the First Aliyah, donating 1,000 roubles to the founding settlers of Yesud HaMa'ala. He is regarded as having been "central" to "the establishment and survival" of Rosh Pinna and Zikhron Ya'akov.

== Esoteric writings ==
Laurence and his wife Alice collaborated on a work of esoteric Christianity, which was published in 1885 as Sympneumata, or Evolutionary Forces Now Active in Man. Influenced by the American mystic Thomas Lake Harris as well as spiritualists Anna Kingsford and Edward Maitland, Sympneumata is founded on an interpretation of the Fall whereby the human soul was originally androgynous but became divided into male and female counterparts upon being encased in physical bodies. In Sympneumata the Oliphants emphasise the need to locate ones physical and spiritual counterparts through a breathing practice, with the aim of unlocking the androgyne within through 'vibratory' motion.

In December 1885, Alice became ill and died on 2 January 1886. Oliphant, also stricken, was too weak to attend her funeral. Oliphant was persuaded that after Alice's death he was in much closer contact with her than when she was still alive, and believed that she inspired him to write Scientific Religion: Or, Higher Possibilities of Life and Practice Through the Operation of Natural Forces, which was published in November 1887.

== Final years ==
In 1888, Oliphant traveled to the United States and married his second wife, Rosamond, a granddaughter of Robert Owen in Malvern. The couple planned to return to Haifa, but Oliphant took sick at York House, Twickenham, England, and died there on 23 December 1888. His obituary in The Times said of him, "Seldom has there been a more romantic or amply filled career; never, perhaps, a stranger or more apparently contradictory personality."

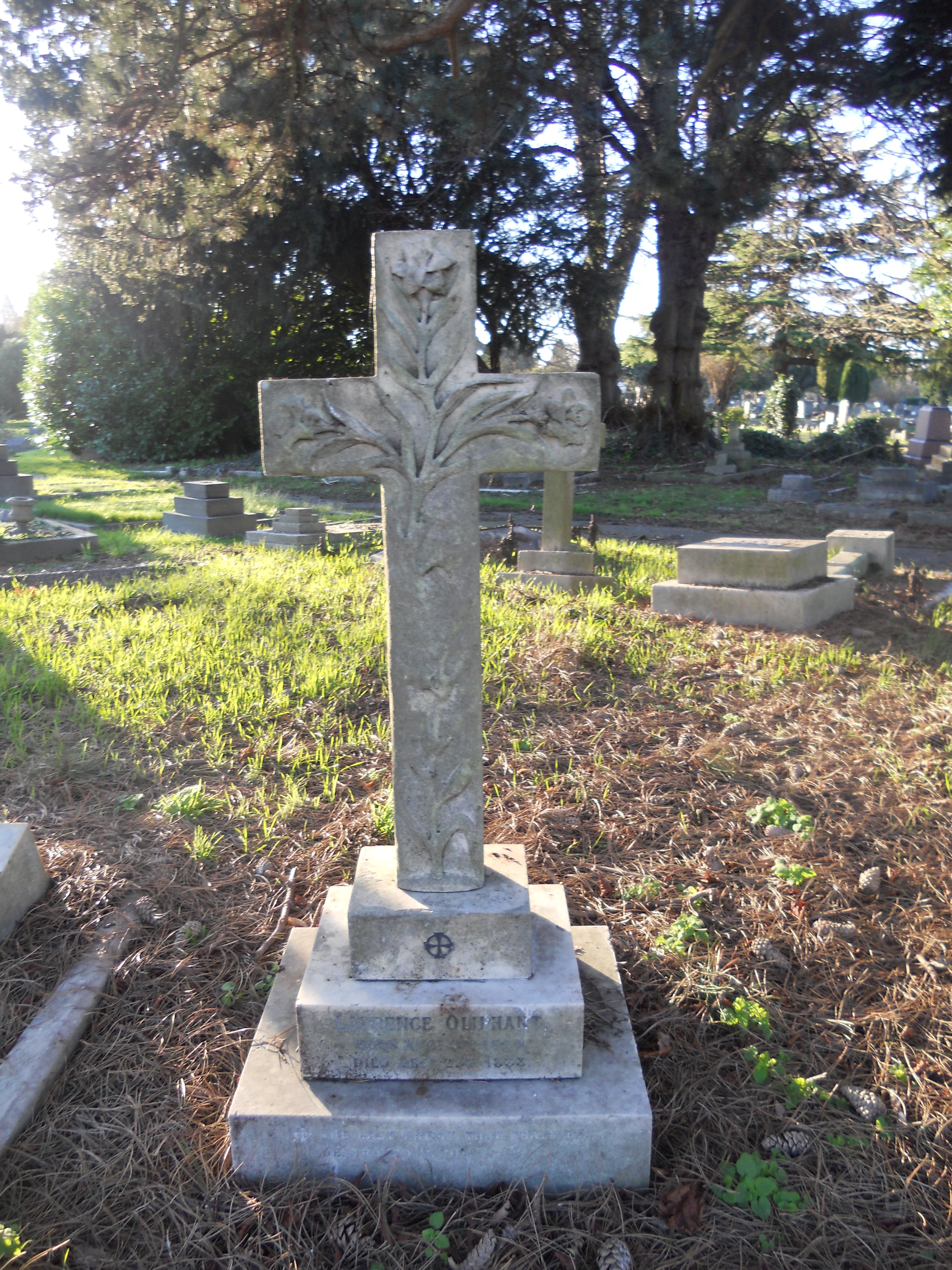
Grave of Oliphant in Twickenham Cemetery in 2014

== Legacy ==
In 2000 Alice Oliphant's watercolours showing Haifa as it was in the late 19th century were shown in a special exhibition entitled "The Drawing Room of Lady Oliphant" at the Israeli National Maritime Museum. Paintings by Alice's sister, Jamesina Waller made during her visit to the Holy Land were also on display. The Jerusalem Post's art critic, Angela Levine, deemed Lady Alice's watercolours, "charming but amateurish."

In 2003, Ticho House in Jerusalem mounted an exhibit of the Holy Land paintings of Alice Oliphant and her sister Jesamine Waller.

== Books ==
- A Journey to Kathmandu (the Capital of Napaul), with The Camp of Jung Bahadoor; including A Sketch of the Nepaulese Ambassador at Home (1852) is a travelogue written in 1852. The book describes the cultural condition of Nepal, however the book is not considered of scientific value. Oliphant then a 21-year-old son of colonial of Colombo joined the team of Jang Bahadur Rana who was returning to Nepal from England with his two younger brothers, Jagat Shamsher and Dhir Shamsher. The team had a stop at Ceylon in December 1850 from where Oliphant accompanied. The book is under public domain since 6 Jul 2005.
- The Russian Shores of the Black Sea in the Autumn of 1852, with a Voyage Down the Volga, and a Tour Through the Country of the Don Cossacks (1853) with a fourth 'enlarged' edition in 1854
- Narrative of the Earl of Elgin's Mission to China and Japan in the Years 1857, '58, '59 (1860)
- Piccadilly: A Fragment of Contemporary Biography (1870)
- Altiora Peto (1883)
- Sympneumata, or Evolutionary Forces Now Active in Man (1885)
- Haifa or Life in Modern Palestine (Jerusalem: Yad Izhak Ben Zvi, 1976 [1885]). Illustrated with watercolors by Lady Alice Oliphant.
- Masollam: A Problem of the Period (1886)
- Scientific Religion: Or, Higher Possibilities of Life and Practice Through the Operation of Natural Forces (1887)
- Episodes in a Life of Adventure: Or, Moss from a rolling Stone (1888)

Parliament of the United Kingdom
| Preceded by James Caird | Member of Parliament for Stirling Burghs; 1865–1868 | Succeeded by John Ramsay |
