= Louis John Jennings =

British politician

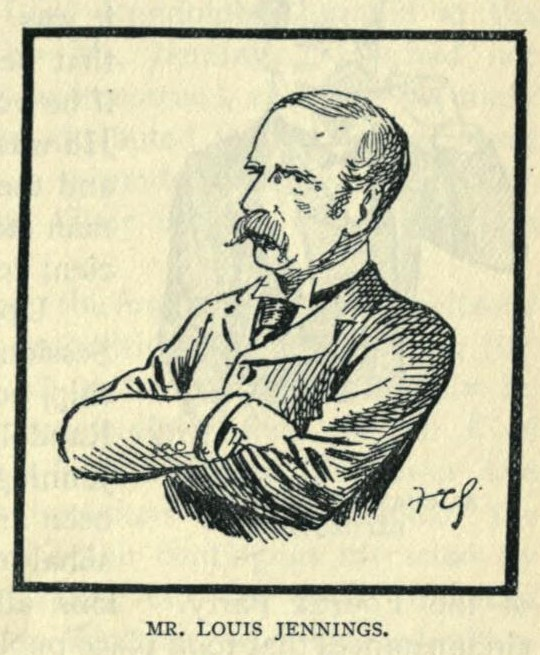
Caricature of Louis Jennings by Francis Carruthers Gould.

Louis John Jennings (12 May 1836 – 9 February 1893) was an English journalist and Conservative politician.

Jennings was born in Walworth, London, the son of John Jennings, a tailor, and his wife Sarah Michel. Following a period with the Saturday Review, he joined The Times newspaper and between 1863 and 1868 was its special correspondent, first in India and, from 1865, the US, where he was successful in mending the paper's relations with the US Government following its support for the South during the Civil War. In 1868 he published his study of Eighty years of republican government in the United States. He then joined The New York Times of which he became editor from 1870 to 1876. As editor he was responsible for the exposure of the Tweed Ring and subsequently received a letter from Chester A. Arthur assuring him that his services to the citizens of New York would not be forgotten.

Jennings returned to London in 1876, following the failure of an attempt to secure financial control of The New York Times, and established a close working relationship with the publisher John Murray, both as book reviewer and author. His initial publications described walks in Sussex, Surrey and the Peak District of Derbyshire. He wrote a novel The Millionaire and in 1885 edited, in three volumes, the papers of John Wilson Croker.

Between 1881 and 1892 he wrote numerous articles for the Quarterly Review, including its regular political article. A strong proponent of the policy of Fair Trade, in 1885 he was elected member of parliament for Stockport. Following the 1886 election he wrote a critical account of William Ewart Gladstone. This was followed by a collection of the speeches of Lord Randolph Churchill, of whom he was for a time a political ally and supporter of Churchill's advocacy of Tory Democracy. However, he later broke with Churchill during the last years of his life. His last work was the novel The Philadelphian.

Jennings died in office as an MP at the age of 55. His first biography, by David Morphet, appeared in 2001.

In 1867 Jennings married Madeline Louise Henriques, daughter of David M Henriques of New York.

His daughter Gertrude E. Jennings (1877–1958) became a notable author of one act theatrical plays in Britain.

== Publications ==
- Eighty years of republican government in the United States- 1868
- Field paths and green lanes; being country walks, chiefly in Surrey and Sussex- 1877
- Rambles among the hills in the Peak of Derbyshire, and the South Downs- 1880
- The Millionaire- 1883
- The Croker papers. The correspondence and diaries of the late Right Honourable John Wilson Croker ... secretary to the Admiralty from 1809 to 1830 by John Wilson Croker (Book)- 1884
- Mr. Gladstone- 1887
- Speeches of the Right Honourable Lord Randolph Churchill, M.P., 1880-1888 by Randolph Henry Spencer Churchill (Book)- 1889
- The Philadelphian- 1891

Parliament of the United Kingdom
Preceded by Charles Henry Hopwood; Frederick Pennington	Member of Parliament for Stockport; 1885–1893; With: William Tipping 1885–1886; Sydney Gedge 1886–1892; Joseph Leigh 1892–1893	Succeeded by George Whiteley; Joseph Leigh
