= Black Bond =

1773 agreement

The Black Bond was a 1773 agreement by three councillors in the Scottish burgh of Stirling to illegally influence the elections of councillors and magistrates and the appointments of council officers. The agreement came to the attention of the authorities and the men were tried at the Court of Session. They were found guilty and the election of Michaelmas of 1773 was annulled and the burgh council dissolved. The burgh also lost its right to elect a Member of Parliament. The rights were restored and a new council elected in 1781.

== Misconduct ==
Three members of the Stirling burgh council, including the Provost of Stirling and a bailie, elected at Michaelmas in 1773, entered into an unlawful agreement. This agreement, which became known as the "Black Bond", was that no person should be selected to sit on the council without the agreement of all three persons, and that each man would support the other during elections. They also agreed that any appointments to council officer positions (such as that of Deacon) should be by agreement of the three men, this being carried out by their vetting of a shortlist of candidates. They agreed to maintain the bond, which effectively gave full control of the council to the three, throughout their lifetimes. Two of the men were elders of the Church of Scotland and one in the Secession Church (Stirling being unusual in having a milder civic oath that permitted the election of Anti-Burghers to public office).

== Court case ==
The three men were brought to trial in the Court of Session in November 1773 on charges of corrupt influence over the matter. All other councillors elected at Michaelmas were also charged with the offence. At court the three men admitted the existence of the agreement, but stated that they had never attempted to influence an election and that the agreement had ended earlier in 1773. The other defendants professed to have no knowledge of the bond. The prosecution called a writer and other witnesses from the town who testified to the existence of the illegal agreement.

The court found that the election was "illegal, unwarrantable and contra bonos mores [against good morals]", and ruled that the results be voided. It was also shown that the election of magistrates had been compromised and this was also voided. The council was dissolved and the burgh was suspended from all corporate privileges including the right to elect a Member of Parliament; the burgh was administered directly by a government commission. The defendants appealed to the House of Lords, but they upheld the original verdict of the Court of Sessions. The agreement was popularly known as the "Black Bond".

Following a petition by the inhabitants to the Crown, the burgh's privileges were restored under a new constitution in 1781 by the King (George III) in council. This allowed for the election of 21 councillors and magistrates at Michaelmas of that year by the burgesses and merchants of the town. The new constitution reduced the influence available to senior council members, with some directly elected officers and others chosen by a wider subset of the council.

== See also ==
- Stirling Burghs (UK Parliament constituency)
