= Houses of Laymen =

The Houses of Laymen are deliberative assemblies of the laity of the Church of England, one for the province of Canterbury, and the other for the province of York. Canterbury's assembly was formed in 1886, and that of York shortly afterwards.

They are merely consultative bodies, and the primary intention of their foundation was to associate the laity in the deliberations of convocation. They have no legal status. The members are elected by the various diocesan conferences, which are in turn elected by the laity of their respective parishes or rural deaneries.

Ten members are appointed for the diocese of London, six for each of the dioceses of Winchester, Rochester, Lichfield and Worcester; and four for each of the remaining dioceses.

The president of each house has the discretionary power of appointing additional laymen, not exceeding ten in number.
