= 1955 Stockport South by-election =

UK Parliamentary by-election

The 1955 Stockport South by-election was held on 3 February 1955. It was held due to the elevation to a hereditary peerage of the incumbent Conservative MP, Arnold Gridley. It was retained by the Conservative candidate, Harold Macdonald Steward.

== Result ==
By-election 1955: Stockport South
Party	Candidate	Votes	%	±%
Conservative	Harold Steward	16,321	54.26	+0.09
Labour	H Davies	13,758	45.73	−0.09
Majority		2,563	8.53	+0.19
Turnout		30,079		
Conservative hold		Swing	+0.09	
