= Commission on Race and Ethnic Disparities =

2020–2021 UK government commission

Front cover of the 31 March 2021 report of the Commission on Race and Ethnic Disparities

The Commission on Race and Ethnic Disparities (CRED) was a UK Government commission supported by the Race Disparity Unit of the Cabinet Office. It was established in 2020 in the wake of Black Lives Matter protests following the murder of George Floyd. Boris Johnson gave it the brief of investigating race and ethnic disparities in the UK. Johnson argued that the UK needed to consider important questions about race relations and disparities and that a thorough examination of why so many disparities persist and what needed to be done to work out to eliminate or mitigate them.

Commission members were recruited by political adviser Munira Mirza, who has previously denied the existence of structural and institutional racism. The members were Tony Sewell (who was appointed in July 2020 to lead the Commission), Maggie Aderin-Pocock, Aftab Chughtai, Keith Fraser, Ajay Kakkar, Naureen Khalid, Dambisa Moyo, Mercy Muroki, Martyn Oliver, Samir Shah and Kunle Olulode. The Observer reported that the members did not write all of the report, nor was it made available in full to them prior to publication.

The commission published its report in March 2021, the content of which caused considerable controversy. The report concluded that the "claim the country is still institutionally racist is not borne out by the evidence", but some experts complained that the report misrepresented evidence, and that recommendations from ethnic minority business leaders who contributed were ignored. Seun Matiluko has written that CRED "would become one of the most controversial government commissions of the 21st century". Additionally, a section on the Caribbean slave trade was amended, following widespread criticism that it glorified the practice and downplayed its negative effects.

== Members ==
Commission members were recruited by political adviser Munira Mirza, who has previously denied the existence of structural and institutional racism.

- Tony Sewell, who led the Commission was running the charity Generating Genius and had previously worked with Boris Johnson during his mayorship of London. The BBC described him as a "longstanding commentator on racial issues and education" who had attracted criticism for some of some comments including that lessons were too "feminised", Afro-Caribbean culture was "anti-intellectual" and that "much of the supposed evidence of institutional racism is flimsy".
- Maggie Aderin-Pocock, a space scientist and presenter of the BBC programme The Sky at Night.
- Aftab Chughtai, the owner of a Birmingham department store and cofounder of the pro-Brexit group Muslims for Britain.
- Keith Fraser, a former police officer and chair of the Youth Justice Board for England and Wales.
- Ajay Kakkar, a Professor of Surgery at University College London.
- Naureen Khalid, a co-founder of UkGovChat, an online forum for school governors.
- Dambisa Moyo, an economist and author.
- Mercy Muroki, a researcher at the Centre for Social Justice think tank.
- Martyn Oliver, CEO of the Outwood Grange Academies Trust.
- Samir Shah, a former journalist and former chair of The Runnymede Trust.
- Kunle Olulode, an anti-racism activist and director of the charity Voice4Change.

== Reactions ==
=== Political ===
Keir Starmer, leader of the Labour Party, said that he was "disappointed" by the Commission's report.

Isabelle Parasram, vice president of the Liberal Democrats, issued a statement that the Commission had "missed the opportunity to make a clear, bold statement on the state of race equality in this country". Parasram said that the "evidence and impact of racism in the UK is overwhelming" and that "whilst some of recommendations made in the report are helpful, they fall far short of what could have been achieved".

The Green Party of England and Wales issued a statement condemning the summary of the report as "a deliberate attempt to whitewash institutional racism" and that "Institutional racism in the UK does exist".

In March 2022, the government announced a series of policy measures intended to address racial disparities, informed by the report. The action plan is called Inclusive Britain.

=== Other ===
Rose Hudson-Wilkin, the Bishop of Dover, described the report as "deeply disturbing"; she said the “lived experience” of the people “tells a different story to that being shared by this report”.

The historian David Olusoga accused the report's authors of appearing to prefer "history to be swept under the carpet" and compared it to the Trump-era 1776 Commission.

A Guardian editorial quoted Boris Johnson's intent to "change the narrative so we stop the sense of victimisation and discrimination" when setting up the commission, and as evidence of the reality of racial inequality listed five recent government reports on different aspects:

- the criminal justice system (the David Lammy review of 2017);
- schools, courts, and the workplace (the Theresa May race audit of 2017);
- pay (the Ruby McGregor-Smith review of 2017);
- deaths in police custody (the Elish Angiolini report of 2017);
- the Windrush scandal (the Wendy Williams review of 2020).

David Goodhart from the right-wing think tank Policy Exchange welcomed the report as "a game-changer for how Britain talks about race".

In an article analysing the report in the journal Ethnicities, Leon Tikly, the UNESCO Chair in Good Quality Education at the University of Bristol, focused on the report's "spurious claims to objectivity, the erasure of racism and the inadequacy of its recommendations". Tikly wrote that "[t]hrough advocating a 'colourblind' approach to education policy and the selective appropriation of multicultural discourse", the report "needs to be understood as part of a wider effort to reconfigure the nationalist project in response to crisis". Tikly did, however, argue that "despite its many flaws, the Sewell report poses challenges for those who have traditionally been aligned to multiculturalism and antiracism in education".

In a response to the report published in BMJ Opinion, medical scholars Mohammad S. Razai, Azeem Majeed and Aneez Esmail argued that "the report’s conclusions, recommendations, and cherry-picked data to support a particular narrative shows why it should have been externally peer reviewed by independent health experts and scientists", and noted the absence of any health experts or biomedical scientists among its authors. Razai, Majeed and Esmail argued that the report's conclusions were reached by ignoring evidence identifying systemic racism as a cause of ethnic differences in socioeconomic status, and characterised the report's claims about COVID-19 as unsupported, and its claims about life expectancy as false and contradictory. The authors concluded that the report was "more suitable as a political manifesto rather than an authoritative expert report."

Several individuals and institutions identified by the report's authors as having conducted research for the report, including The King's Fund and the historians Stephen Bourne and S. I. Martin, said after its publication that they had not conducted research specifically for the commission. Bourne said he had been identified as a "stakeholder" after identifying a roundtable discussion, and had not known the purpose of the event or that the report was being compiled.

The UN Working Group of Experts on People of African Descent issued a statement categorically rejecting and condemning the analysis and findings of the report.
