= Tony Sewell =

British educational consultant (born 1959)

The Lord Sewell of Sanderstead CBE
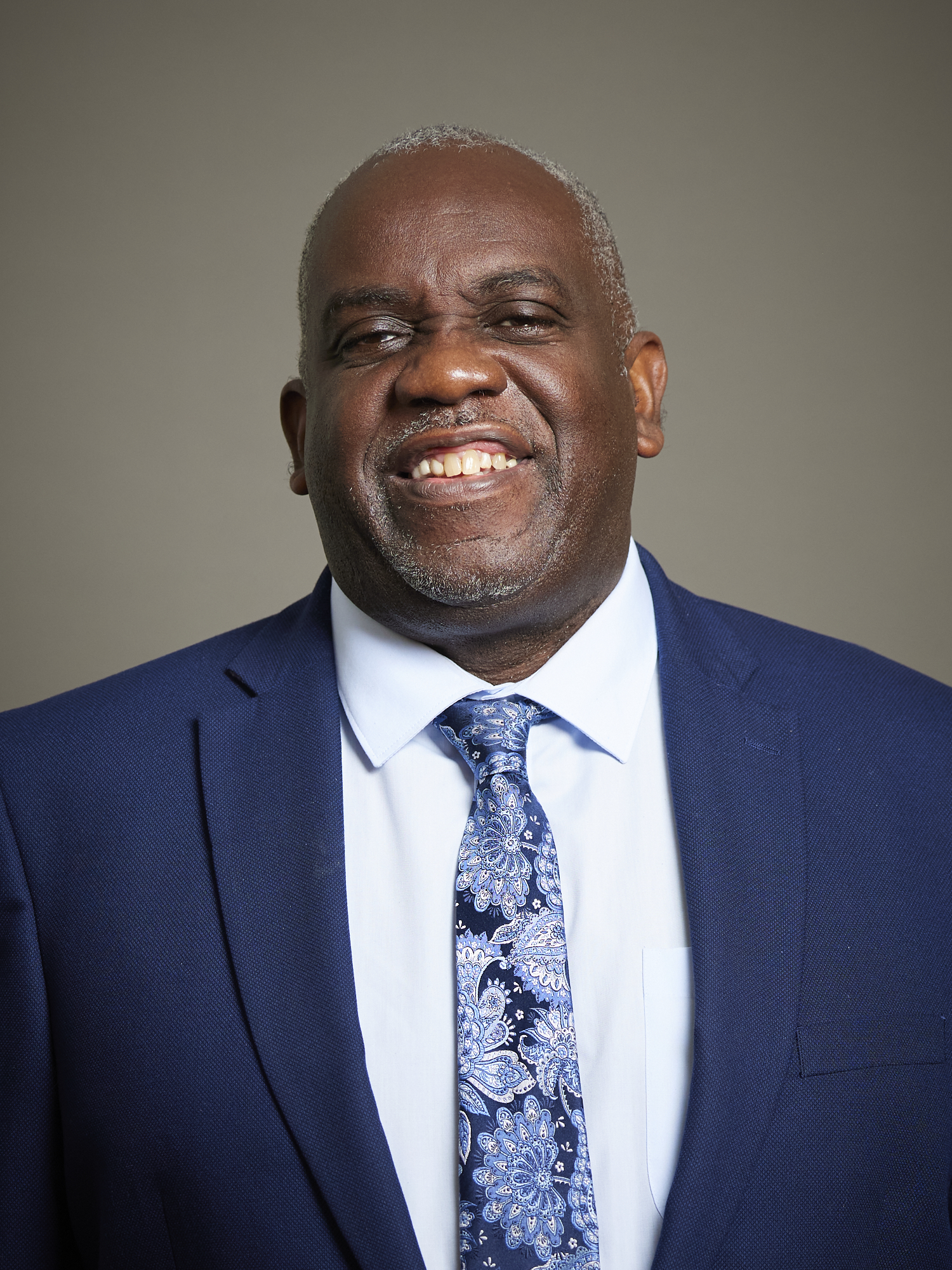
- Official portrait, 2024

Member of the House of Lords
- Lord Temporal
- Life peerage 16 December 2022

Chair of the Commission on Race and Ethnic Disparities
- In office July 2020 – 28 April 2021
- Prime Minister: Boris Johnson

Personal details
- Born: Cleveland Anthony Sewell; 6 August 1959 (age 67) Brixton, England
- Party: Conservative
- Education: University of Essex (BA); University of Nottingham (PhD)
- Occupation: Educational consultant

Cleveland Anthony Sewell, Baron Sewell of Sanderstead, CBE (born 6 August 1959) is a British educational consultant and the founder and chair of the educational charity Generating Genius. In July 2020, Sewell was appointed chair of the Commission on Race and Ethnic Disparities, tasked with investigating racial disparities in the United Kingdom. Since 2022, Sewell has sat in the House of Lords as a life peer. Sewell has also been described as an admirer of the Black conservative scholar Thomas Sowell.

== Early life and education ==
Tony Sewell was born in Brixton, London, on 6 August 1959 and grew up in Penge, a suburb in south-east London. Sewell's parents arrived in the United Kingdom from Jamaica in the 1950s. During his childhood, Sewell was a member of the Scouts and spent much of his adolescence participating in church youth group activities in and around Sydenham, a district of south-east London.

In 1981, Sewell graduated from the University of Essex with a Bachelor of Arts in English Literature. He later earned a PhD in education from the University of Nottingham in 1995, with a thesis on "The relationship between African-Caribbean boys' subculture and schooling".

== Career ==
After graduating from university, Sewell was employed as a schoolteacher in Brent. Sewell left this role to teach in Jamaica for two years.

During the late 1980s and early 1990s, he wrote a weekly social commentary column for The Voice titled "Live and Kicking". In July 2020, The Guardian reported that in a 1990 column in The Voice newspaper, Sewell had written: "We heteros are sick and tired of tortured queens playing hide and seek around their closets. Homosexuals are the greatest queer-bashers around. No other group of people are so preoccupied with making their own sexuality look dirty". In response, Sewell apologised and said that his comments were "wrong and offensive". Sewell also hosted a weekly talk show programme on Choice FM.

After gaining his doctorate in 1995, Sewell worked as a university lecturer at Kingston University in south-west London and later at the University of Leeds.

In 2006, Sewell stated that boys were being failed by schools because lessons had become too "feminised". John Dunford, general secretary of the Association of School and College Leaders, described Sewell as making "sweeping generalisations" and argued that "schools have put an immense amount of effort into raising boys' achievement in recent years, just as they did for girls in the previous years".

Sewell served as an international consultant in education for the World Bank and Commonwealth Secretariat.

In 2012, Sewell was appointed by the then Mayor of London, Boris Johnson, to chair an inquiry into the challenges faced by primary and secondary schools in London. The findings of the inquiry led to the government agreeing to provide around £25 million to improve teachers' subject knowledge as part of the London Schools Excellence Fund.

In October 2015, Sewell was appointed as a member of the Youth Justice Board for England and Wales.

=== Commission on Race and Ethnic Disparities ===
In July 2020, Sewell was appointed chair of a Government commission tasked with examining race disparity in the UK. His appointment was criticized by the Muslim Council of Britain, which stated that Sewell was "keen on downplaying race disparities". On 31 March 2021, the 258-page report of the Commission on Race and Ethnic Disparities led by Sewell, was published. It concluded that while racism exists in the UK, the UK was not institutionally racist. The report was praised by writer and former Social Mobility commissioner David Goodhart and by The Times, which described it as a "nuanced and practical document". Trevor Phillips, the former chairman of the Equality and Human Rights Commission who supported the report, criticised the "white establishment" for not defending Sewell from criticism. In March 2022, the Government's formal response to the Commission's Report, the Inclusive Britain report, was published, which accepted all the recommendations made by Sewell's report.

Following the report's publication, Sewell received a considerable amount of online criticism, including from Labour MP Clive Lewis, who tweeted a picture of a Ku Klux Klan member, and from Cambridge post-colonial studies academic Priyamvada Gopal, who questioned if Sewell had a real doctorate and then compared him to Joseph Goebbels. Commentators on race, education, health, and economics criticized the report's findings for downplaying the extent of racism in Britain. The Runnymede Trust, a race equality think tank, stated that the report was a "let down" that denied the existence of institutional racism. A further study on racial disparity, led by Nissa Finney, a professor of human geography at the University of St Andrews, was published in April 2023. It asserted that the Sewell Report downplayed the existence and impact of structural and institutional racism and concluded that "Britain is not close to being a racially just society". Its findings were not recognised by the government.

=== Peerage ===
It was announced on 14 October 2022, as part of the 2022 Special Honours, that Sewell would be appointed a life peer. On 16 December 2022, he was created Baron Sewell of Sanderstead, of Sanderstead in the County of Surrey.

== Honours and awards ==
- In the 2016 Birthday Honours, appointed Commander of the Order of the British Empire (CBE) for services to education.
- 2017, received an Honorary LLD degree from the University of Exeter.
- 2018, named an Honorary Fellow of University College London.
- 2019, awarded an Honorary LLD degree from the University of Essex.
- 2019, received an Honorary Degree from the University of Nottingham. In 2022 the institution withdrew the degree after Sewell became "the subject of political controversy".
- 2022, received an Honorary Doctorate from the University of Buckingham.

== Publications ==
- Garvey's children: the legacy of Marcus Garvey. London: Voice Communications, 1987.
- Jamaica Inc. London: The X Press, 1993.
- Keep on Moving: The Windrush Legacy - The Black Experience in Britain from 1948. London: Voice Enterprises, 1998.
- Black Masculinities and Schooling: How Black Boys Survive Modern Schooling. Stoke-on-Trent: Trentham Books Ltd, 1996.
- Generating Genius: Black Boys in Love, Ritual and Schooling. Stoke-on-Trent: Trentham, 2006.
- Black Success: The Surprising Truth. Swift Press, 2024.

Orders of precedence in the United Kingdom
Preceded by The Lord Watson of Wyre Forest	Gentlemen; Baron Sewell of Sanderstead	Followed by The Lord Young of Old Windsor
