= Baron Gridley =

Title in the Peerage of the United Kingdom

Baron Gridley, of Stockport in the County Palatine of Chester, is a title in the Peerage of the United Kingdom. It was created on 10 January 1955 for the Conservative politician Sir Arnold Gridley, who had earlier represented Stockport and Stockport South in the House of Commons. As of 2010 the title is held by his grandson, the third Baron, who succeeded his father in 1996.

Richard, the present Lord Gridley, is married to Marie, Lady Gridley. They live in Waterlooville, Hampshire.

== Barons Gridley (1955) ==
- Arnold Babb Gridley, 1st Baron Gridley (1878–1965)
- Arnold Hudson Gridley, 2nd Baron Gridley (1906–1996)
- Richard David Arnold Gridley, 3rd Baron Gridley (born 1956)

The heir presumptive is the present holder's first cousin Peter Arnold Charles Gridley (born 1940).

=== Line of Succession ===
- Arnold Babb Gridley, 1st Baron Gridley (1878—1965)
  - Arnold Hudson Gridley, 2nd Baron Gridley (1906—1996)
    - Richard David Arnold Gridley, 3rd Baron Gridley (born 1956)
      - Hon. Carl Richard Gridley (b. 1981)
  - Eric Howard Gridley (1911—1946)
    - (1) Peter Arnold Charles Gridley (b. 1940)
    - (2)Howard Eric Gridley (b. 1945)

Coat of arms of Baron Gridley
| Crest A wyvern Azure semee of lozenges Or, resting the dexter claw on a grid iron Gules. Escutcheon Gules three bendlets enhanced and in base a portcullis chained Or. Supporters On the dexter a wyvern Azure semee of lozenges Or on the sinister a lion Gules semee of grid irons Gold. Motto Devant Si Je Puis |
