= Tom McNally, Baron McNally =

British politician (born 1943)

The Right Honourable The Lord McNally PC
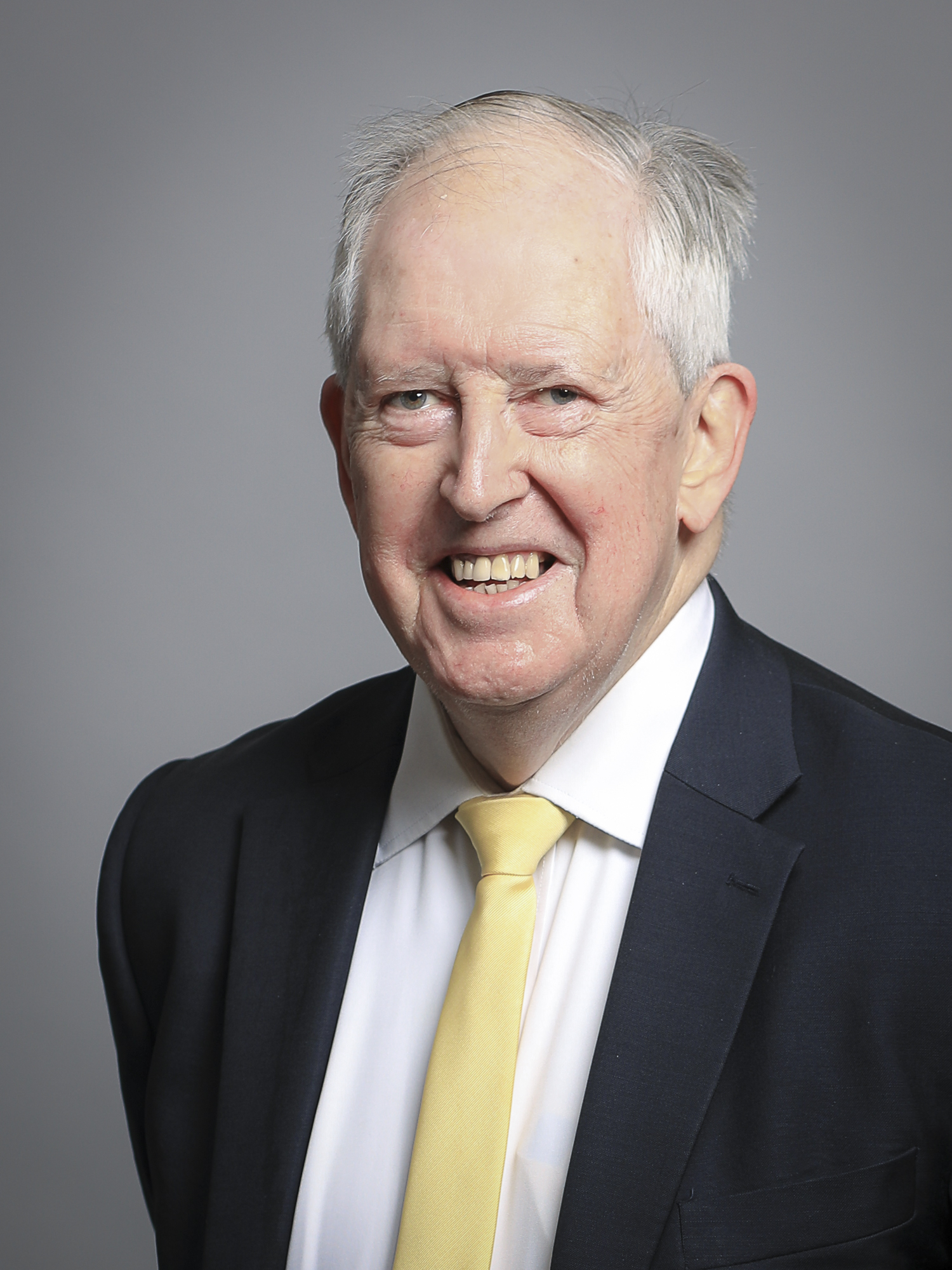
- Official portrait, 2020

Chairman of the Youth Justice Board
- In office March 2014 – March 2017
- Appointed by: Chris Grayling
- Preceded by: Frances Done
- Succeeded by: Charlie Taylor

Deputy Leader of the House of Lords
- In office 13 May 2010 – 15 October 2013
- Prime Minister: David Cameron
- Leader: The Lord Strathclyde; The Lord Hill of Oareford
- Preceded by: Lord Hunt of Kings Heath
- Succeeded by: Lord Wallace of Tankerness

Minister of State for Justice
- In office 13 May 2010 – 18 December 2013
- Prime Minister: David Cameron
- Preceded by: Michael Wills
- Succeeded by: Simon Hughes

Leader of the Liberal Democrats in the House of Lords
- In office 24 November 2004 – 15 October 2013
- Leader: Charles Kennedy; Menzies Campbell; Vince Cable (acting); Nick Clegg
- Preceded by: The Baroness Williams of Crosby
- Succeeded by: Lord Wallace of Tankerness

Member of the House of Lords
- Lord Temporal
- Life peerage 20 December 1995

Member of Parliament for Stockport South
- In office 3 May 1979 – 13 May 1983
- Preceded by: Maurice Orbach
- Succeeded by: Constituency abolished

Political Secretary to the Prime Minister of the United Kingdom
- In office 1976–1979
- Prime Minister: James Callaghan
- Preceded by: Marcia Falkender
- Succeeded by: Richard Ryder

Personal details
- Born: 20 February 1943 (age 83)
- Party: Liberal Democrats (1988–present)
- Other political affiliations: SDP (1981–1988); Labour (until 1981)
- Education: University College London

Thomas McNally, Baron McNally (born 20 February 1943) is a British politician and a former Leader of the Liberal Democrats in the House of Lords.

== Early life ==
McNally was born in Blackpool. A Catholic of Irish descent, he attended St Joseph's College, Blackpool. He later attended University College London, where he was elected president of the Debating Society as well as Students' Union President.

== Professional career ==
He later worked for the Fabian Society, and then as a full-time employee of the Labour Party, becoming its international secretary. He served as a political advisor to Foreign Secretary James Callaghan during the conflict in Cyprus in the 1970s, before becoming head of the Prime Minister's political office at Downing Street in 1976 when Callaghan succeeded Harold Wilson.

== Political career ==
Elected to the House of Commons in 1979 as a member of the Labour Party for the constituency of Stockport South, in 1981 he was one of the later defectors to the new Social Democratic Party (SDP). Following constituency boundary changes for the 1983 general election McNally was the SDP candidate for the new constituency of Stockport, but finished in third place behind Labour and the Conservative victor, Anthony Favell.

From 1993 he was Head of Public Affairs at Shandwick Consultants, and later non-executive vice-chairman of its successor Weber Shandwick.

On 18 November 1995 it was announced McNally would receive a life peerage. The Letters Patent were issued on 20 December and he took the title Baron McNally, of Blackpool in the County of Lancashire.

After being elected unopposed to succeed Baroness Williams of Crosby, he took office as Leader of the Liberal Democrats in the House of Lords at the beginning of the 2004/05 session of Parliament.

In January 2006, McNally was linked to the resignation of Charles Kennedy as leader of the Liberal Democrats, with critical comments regarding Kennedy's leadership of the party, and the effect that infighting was having on their electoral prospects in the upcoming local elections in May. McNally criticised Kennedy, suggesting that his style and content were lacklustre. Also in January 2006, McNally revealed in an interview that he had himself been alcohol dependent in the 1980s. He said, "I don't think the passing of a more boozy, ill-disciplined, ill-researched type of politics is to be regretted at all."

In May 2010, following the formation of the Conservative-Liberal Democrat Coalition Government, Lord McNally was appointed Minister of State at the Ministry of Justice, under Kenneth Clarke.

In 2012 McNally justified the absence of an official pardon of mathematician Alan Turing on indecency charges, saying that Turing was rightly prosecuted under the UK's 1950s laws.

On 2 October 2013, Lord McNally announced he would be stepping down as leader of the Liberal Democrats in the House of Lords, saying it had been "an enormous privilege to serve as Leader of a Group which, by its discipline and cohesiveness has constantly punched above its weight".

Lord McNally resigned as Minister of State for Justice on 18 December 2013 following his appointment as Chair of the Youth Justice Board. He is a vice-president of the Debating Group.

== Family ==
Lord McNally is married with two sons and one daughter.

== See also ==
- Liberal Democrat frontbench team

Government offices
Preceded by Marcia Falkender	Political Secretary to the Prime Minister; 1976–1979	Succeeded by Richard Ryder
Parliament of the United Kingdom
Preceded by Maurice Orbach	Member of Parliament for Stockport South; 1979–1983	Constituency abolished
Political offices
Preceded by The Lord Hunt of Kings Heath	Deputy Leader of the House of Lords; 2010–2013	Succeeded by The Lord Wallace of Tankerness
Party political offices
Preceded by Gwyn Morgan	Secretary of the International Department of the Labour Party; 1969–1974	Succeeded by Jenny Little
Preceded by Shirley Williams	Leader of the Liberal Democrats in the House of Lords; 2004–2013	Succeeded by Jim Wallace
Orders of precedence in the United Kingdom
Preceded by The Lord Wallace of Saltaire	Gentlemen; Baron McNally	Followed by The Lord Sewel
