= List of United Kingdom Whig and allied party leaders, 1801–1859 =

This article provides a list of United Kingdom Whig and allied party leaders from 1801 to 1859. During the 19th century, the Whigs, Radicals and Peelites gradually evolved into the Liberal Party. The Liberal Party was formally established in 1859 and continued to exist until it merged with the Social Democratic Party in 1988 to create the Liberal Democrats.

== End of the age of factions ==
Whig and allied party leaders

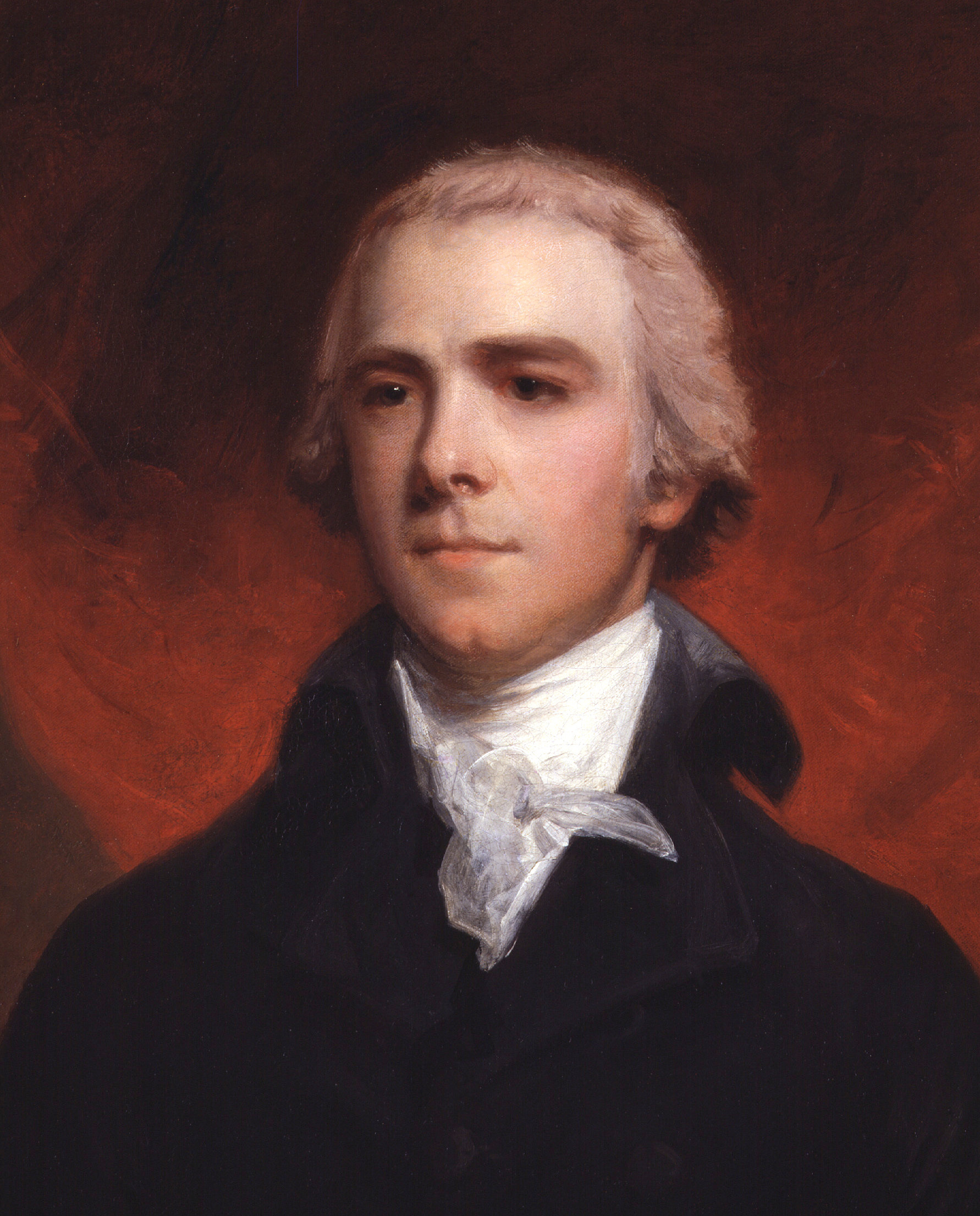
The Lord Grenville
1806–1807

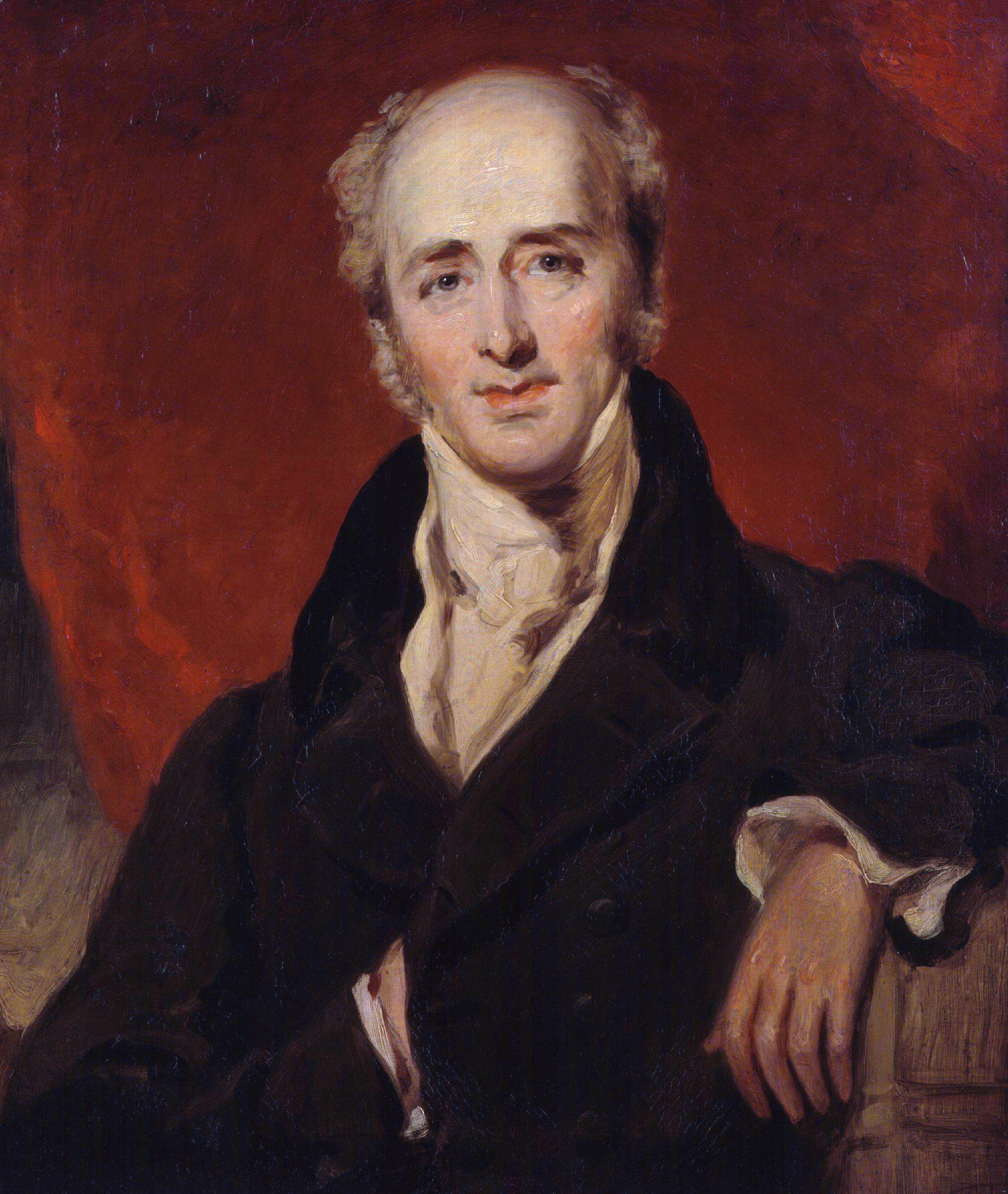
The Earl Grey
1830–1834

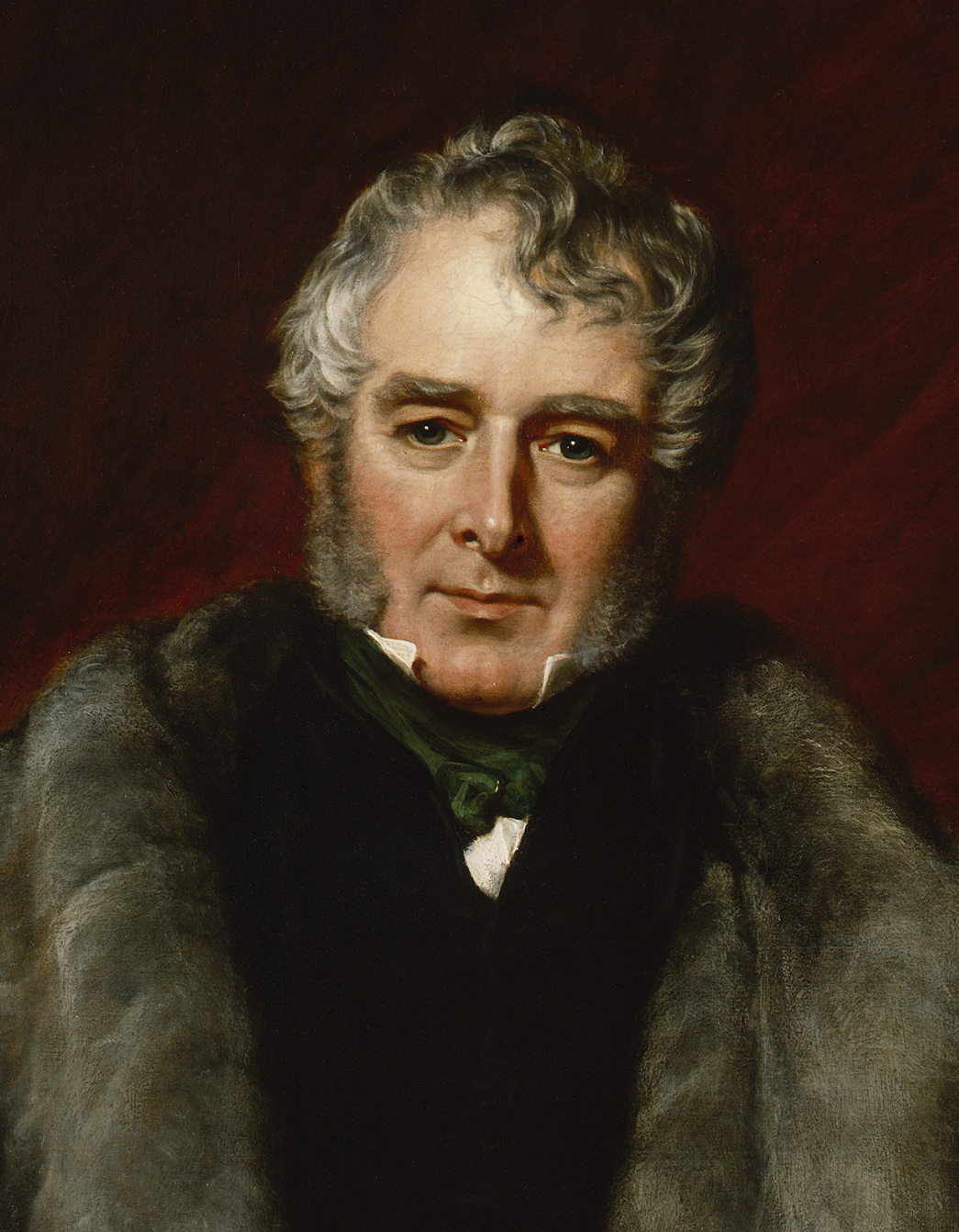
The Viscount Melbourne
1834–1842

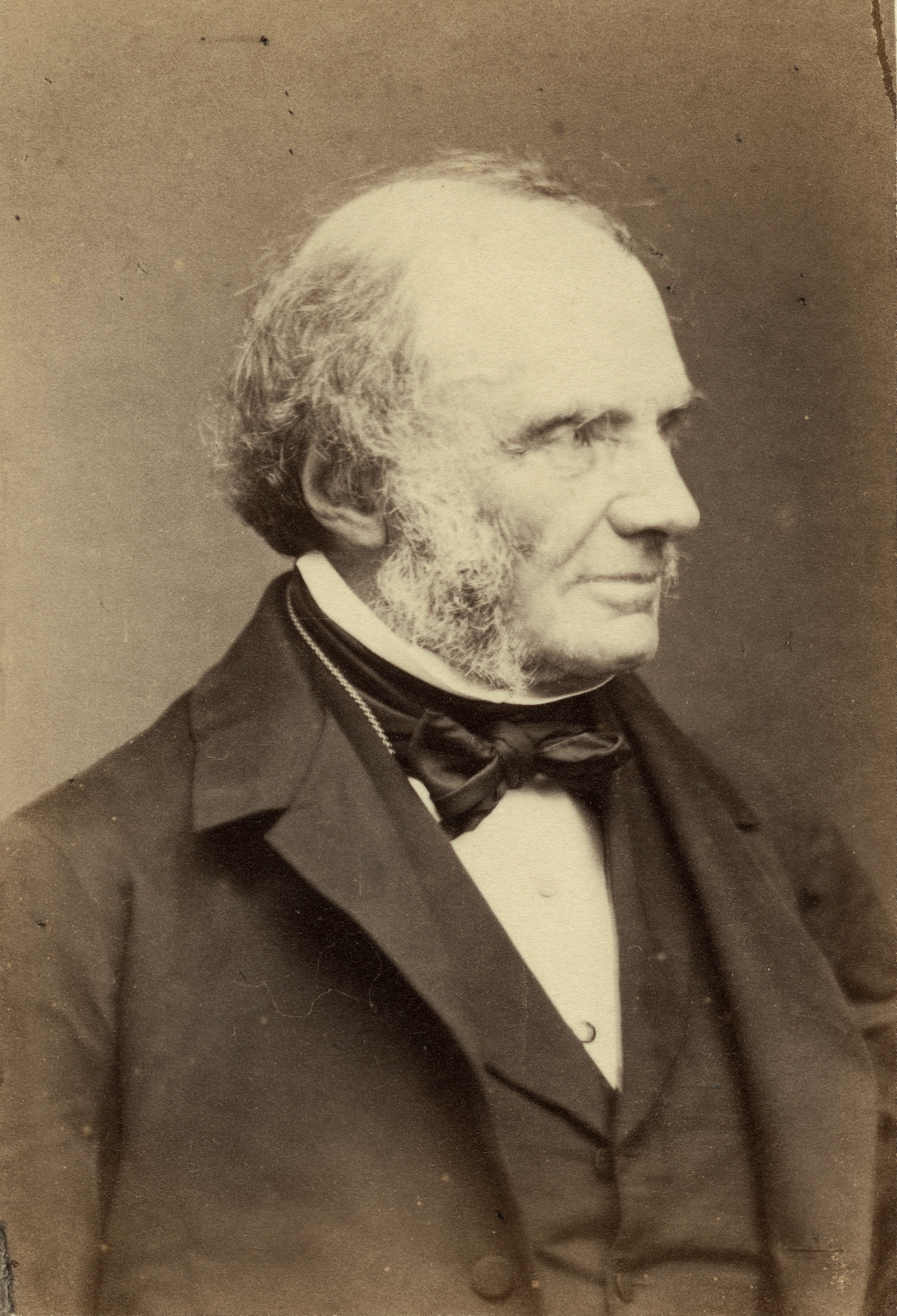
Lord John Russell
1846–1852

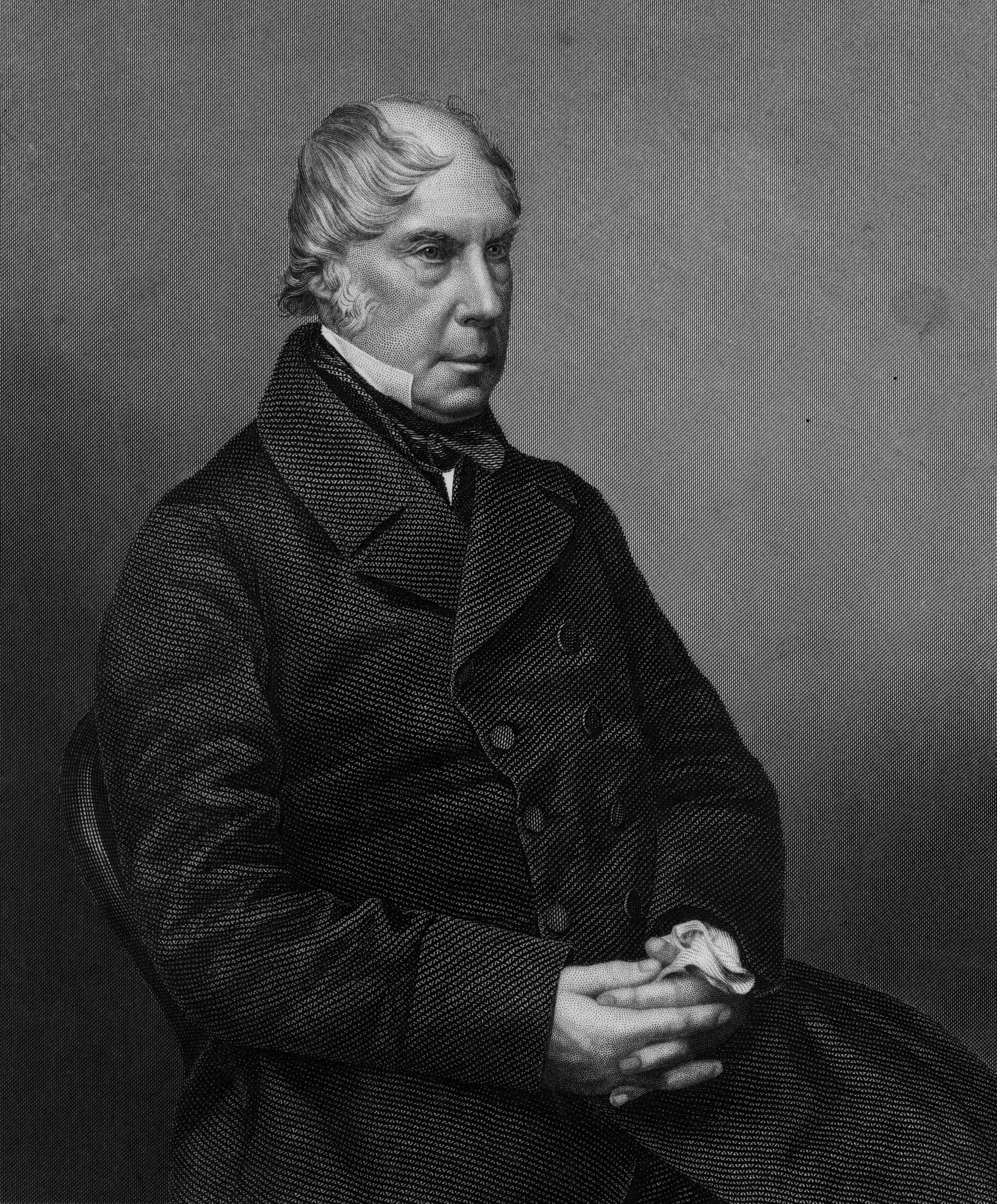
The Earl of Aberdeen
1852–1855

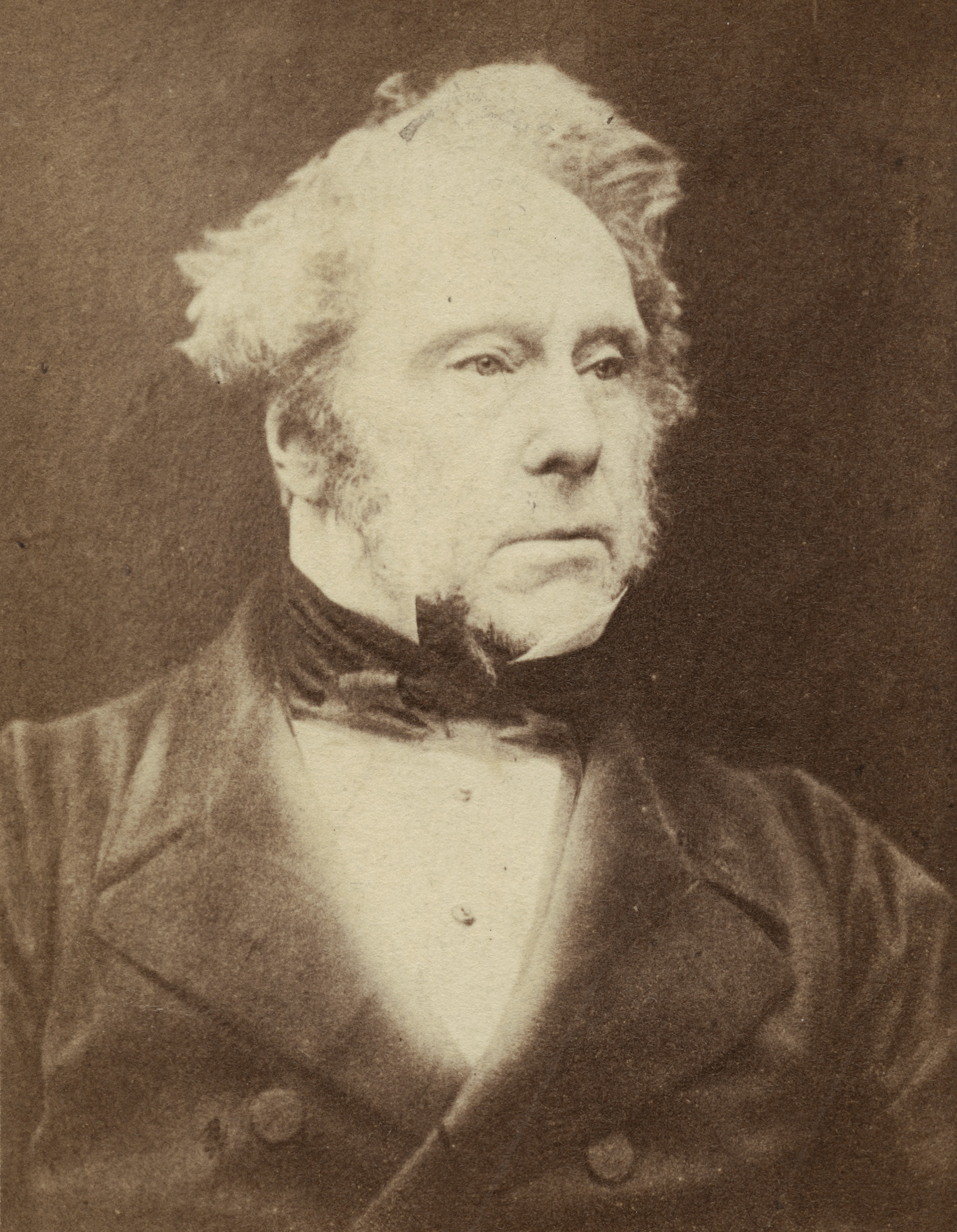
The Viscount Palmerston
1852–1855

When the United Kingdom came into existence, on 1 January 1801, the era of disciplined mass parties had not yet begun. Although individuals and families regarded themselves as belonging to a Whig or Tory tradition, actual political allegiance tended to be to family connections and to factions grouped behind a prominent political leader. Most of these loose associations of politicians, after the disappearance of almost any party bonds by about 1760 and the accession of George III, contained members from both Whig and Tory traditions.

In the first decade of the 19th century most politicians realigned themselves into fairly cohesive Whig and Tory parties. Thereafter individuals and groups might move between the two parties, but they both maintained a continuous existence (through a number of mergers and name changes). These two groups were the direct ancestors of the 21st-century Liberal Democrat and Conservative parties.

There were several stages in the consolidation of the parties:

Until 1801
Prime Minister William Pitt the Younger commanded the support of most of the House of Commons. The Pittite coalition of Tories and pro-government Whigs had supported Pitt through the Revolutionary Wars with France. His principal opposition was the relatively weak faction of Whigs, led by Charles James Fox. For four years after 1797 opposition attendance at Westminster had been sporadic as Fox pursued a strategy of secession from Parliament. Only a small group, led by George Tierney, had attended frequently to oppose the ministers. As Foord observes "only once did the minority reach seventy-five, and it was often less than ten".
1801–1804
The King shattered the Pittite coalition when he forced Pitt to resign over Catholic emancipation. The former followers of Pitt divided into three groups: the supporters of the new Prime Minister Henry Addington, a Pittite faction which supported Addington but would not join his government, and the Grenvillite Whigs who joined the Foxites in opposition.
1804–1806
Pitt returned to power and it was the turn of Addington's faction to be semi-detached from the ministry. Fox and Grenville continued in outright opposition. Pitt died in 1806, but his supporters could not form a new administration.
1806–1807
Lord Grenville formed the Ministry of All the Talents, combining the Grenvillite, Foxite and Addingtonian factions. The Pittites were in opposition. However Fox died during 1806 and that weakened the government. The hostility of the King made this a short-lived ministry. It did however reinforce the tendency of the two Whig factions to work together.
1807 onwards
In government after 1807 the ex-Pittite and (from 1812) the Addingtonian factions increasingly began to call themselves the Tory Party. In opposition, the leading Whig in the House of Commons was Fox's political heir Viscount Howick. However, when he became the 2nd Earl Grey in 1807, he and Grenville agreed to propose a leader to the Whigs in the Commons. This person was the first MP to be recognised as Leader of the Opposition, rather than leader of an opposition. From this time almost all of the politicians who called themselves Whigs, were supporters of an organised Whig Party. The few remaining veterans on the government side who still called themselves Whigs (notably the Prime Minister, the Duke of Portland) gradually left the political scene, so something resembling a two party system developed.

== Leadership selection ==
There was only a leader of the Whig Party as a whole, when a party member (or the leader of an allied group like the Peelites) was Prime Minister or (from 1830) was the most recent Prime Minister from the party and was still in active politics. At other times the leaders in the House of Lords and House of Commons were of equal status and in theory jointly led the party.

When a new leader was required, with the party in government, the monarch selected him by appointing someone as First Lord of the Treasury.

When no overall party leader was a member of a House and a new leader was required in opposition, a leader emerged and was approved by party members in that House. Before 1807 faction leaders were not necessarily followed by all opposition Whigs. However, by 1807 the party in the House of Commons, as opposed to a faction or factions within it, had acquired recognised leaders.

== Lists of Whig Party leaders ==
=== Leaders of the Whig Party ===
No.	Name	Constituency / Title	Took office	Left office
—	No recognised leader	—	1801	1806
1	William Grenville	1st Baron Grenville	11 February 1806	31 March 1807
—	No recognised leader	—	1807	1830
2	Charles Grey	2nd Earl Grey	22 November 1830	16 July 1834
3	William Lamb	2nd Viscount Melbourne	16 July 1834	October 1842
—	No recognised leader	—	1842	1846
4	Lord John Russell	City of London	30 June 1846	19 December 1852
5	George Hamilton-Gordon (Note: Aberdeen was a Peelite (or more formally a Liberal Conservative) ally of the Whigs.)	4th Earl of Aberdeen	19 December 1852	6 February 1855
6	The Viscount Palmerston (Note: Palmerston was an Irish peer.)	Tiverton	6 February 1855	12 June 1859

==== In the House of Commons ====
Charles James Fox and Viscount Howick, as unofficial leaders of the party in the House of Commons from 1801 to 1807, led the largest of the anti-Pittite Whig groups. They were the successive government leaders of the House of Commons during the Ministry of All the Talents. Howick continued as a faction leader in opposition during 1807, until he inherited his peerage. From the appointment of George Ponsonby in 1808 the leaders were official.

No.	Name	Constituency	Took office	Left office
1	Charles James Fox (Note: Fox was an unofficial leader of the party, as he led its largest faction.)	Westminster	1801	1806
2	Viscount Howick (Note: Howick was an unofficial leader of the party, as he led its largest faction. He had a courtesy title, as the heir of the Earl Grey.)	Northumberland (1806–1807); Appleby (May–July 1807); Tavistock (July 1807)	1806	1807
3	George Ponsonby	Tavistock (1808–1812); Peterborough (1812–1816); Wicklow (1816–1817)	1808	1817
4	George Tierney	Appleby (1817–1818); Knaresborough (1818–1821)	1818	1821
—	No recognised leader	—	1821	1830
5	Viscount Althorp (Note: Althorp had a courtesy title, as the heir of the Earl Spencer.)	Northamptonshire	1830	1834
6	Lord John Russell	South Devon (1834–1835); Stroud (1835–1841); City of London (1841–1855)	1834	1855
7	The Viscount Palmerston	Tiverton	1855	1859

==== In the House of Lords ====
No attempt is made to include a leader in the House of Lords in the table below before 1830, except during the Ministry of All the Talents. Earl Grey was probably the leading Whig in the House from 1807, particularly once Lord Grenville retired in 1817.

No.	Name	Title	Took office	Left office
—	No recognised leader	—	1801	1806
1	William Grenville	1st Baron Grenville	11 February 1806	31 March 1807
—	No recognised leader	—	1807	1830
2	Charles Grey	2nd Earl Grey	22 November 1830	16 July 1834
3	William Lamb	2nd Viscount Melbourne	16 July 1834	October 1842
4	Henry Petty-Fitzmaurice	3rd Marquess of Lansdowne	October 1842	19 December 1852
5	George Hamilton-Gordon	4th Earl of Aberdeen	19 December 1852	6 February 1855
6	Granville Leveson-Gower	2nd Earl Granville	1855	1859

== See also ==
- Liberalism in the United Kingdom
- Leader of the Liberal Democrats
- Leader of the Liberal Democrats in the House of Lords
- Leader of the Liberal Party (UK)
