= Harold Steward =

British consulting engineer and politician

Sir Harold Macdonald Steward (8 September 1904 – 3 March 1977) was a British consulting engineer and Conservative Party politician. He was the Member of Parliament (MP) for Stockport South for nine years, and later became Leader of Liverpool City Council.

== Engineering training ==
Steward was born in Rainhill, near St Helens. He went to the local secondary school and to Cowley School in St Helens. He went into business at the age of 14, continuing to train in engineering at the St Helens Municipal Technical College. Steward later became a production engineering manager, and later, still a development engineer; he worked for the same company all through. During the Second World War, he was seconded to work on radar research, and after the end of the war, served on an inter-services mission to former enemy countries.

== Involvement in politics ==
Already interested in politics (he had won a Conservative Party prize for public speaking before the war), Steward was appointed a Justice of the Peace for Lancashire in 1951 and fought Liverpool Edge Hill at the general election later that year. This was a near marginal constituency, although in the result, Labour improved its majority in the constituency against the national trend. Steward was elected to Liverpool City Council in 1953.

== Byelection candidate ==
In January 1955, Steward was selected from 60 applicants to be Conservative candidate for Stockport South where a byelection was pending after Sir Arnold Gridley was given a peerage. In a straight fight with a Labour candidate, Steward won with a majority of 2,563, which was almost the same as at the previous election (making allowances for the reduced turnout).

== Parliament ==
Steward made his maiden speech on the 1955 Finance Bill, on 27 April 1955. He concentrated on the budget effects on industry, and he gave his opinion that the use of strikes in industry was becoming obsolete, because more and more problems would be solved by negotiation. Unlike most other councillors who became MPs, Steward did not give up his seat on Liverpool council and continued to be an active councillor. This activity inevitably restricted the time he had for Parliamentary activity. He was a very early supporter of a British application to join the European Communities.

== Liverpool ==
Loyal to the government over the Suez Crisis, Steward was a low-profile Member. He was part of a Parliamentary delegation to Jordan in 1958. In 1959, Steward made a speech on Liverpool Council urging the establishment of a development board to regenerate Merseyside which attracted national publicity; the Labour majority on the council were sceptical of the position and instead called on the United Kingdom government to provide additional aid. In 1960, as Deputy Leader of the Conservative group, he strongly opposed a motion by the Labour majority on the council to boycott goods from South Africa in protest at apartheid. He was elected as an Alderman in 1961; in the same year he chaired a conference on the effect of British membership of the Common Market on the North West economy.

Steward was chairman of the Planning Committee of Liverpool City Council in 1962. In January 1963, he was identified in a piece broadcast on BBC TV's That Was the Week That Was which named 13 MPs who had not spoken in the House of Commons since the previous general election. As with his constituency neighbour, Sir Norman Hulbert, he pleaded that making speeches was not the beginning and end of Parliamentary activity and he sought re-election in the 1964 general election; however, his marginal constituency fell to Labour.

== Council leadership ==
After being chosen as Leader of the Conservative group on Liverpool City Council in 1964, Steward became Chairman of Liverpool Conservatives in 1966. He planned the Conservatives' election campaigns based on opposing rent and rate rises imposed by the Labour-controlled council. Although failing to make advances in the 1966 general election, the Conservatives did win a majority on Liverpool Council in 1967. Steward became Leader of the Council. From 1969 to 1972 he was Chairman of Merseyside Passenger Transport Authority, responsible for running the Mersey Ferry, and campaigning for a new Mersey tunnel.

In the 1972 New Year Honours, Steward was given a Knighthood. He stood down from the City Council in 1974 when it was reorganised.

Parliament of the United Kingdom
Preceded by Sir Arnold Gridley	Member of Parliament for Stockport South; 1955–1964	Succeeded by Maurice Orbach

Preceded by Bill Sefton	Leader of Liverpool City Council; 1967-72	Succeeded by Bill Sefton
