= Maurice Orbach =

20th-century British Labour politician

Maurice Orbach MP

Member of Parliament for Stockport South
- In office 15 October 1964 – 7 April 1979
- Preceded by: Harold Steward
- Succeeded by: Tom McNally

Member of Parliament for Willesden East
- In office 5 July 1945 – 18 September 1959
- Preceded by: Samuel Hammersley
- Succeeded by: Trevor Skeet

Personal details
- Born: 13 July 1902 Cardiff, Wales
- Died: 24 April 1979 (aged 76)
- Party: Labour
- Spouse: Ruth Hubsch (m. 1935)
- Children: 2, including Susie
- Education: Columbia University

Maurice Orbach (13 July 1902 – 24 April 1979) was a British Labour Party politician, who at different times was the Member of Parliament for the Willesden East and Stockport South constituencies.

== Background ==
Born to a Jewish family, Orbach was educated at technical college in Wales and as an extramural student at New York University.

== Career ==
=== Public service ===
Orbach was a lifelong member of Poale Zion (Great Britain).

He was general secretary of the Jewish Trades Advisory Council ("a committee of the Board of Deputies of British Jews, aimed at countering anti-Semitism in business life" during World War II) from 1940 and remained its secretary until his death.

He was chairman of Central Middlesex Group hospital management committee.

He was active in the World Jewish Congress (WJC). In 1954, on behalf of both the WJC and Winston Churchill, he went to Cairo to help save the lives of Jews sentenced to death as part of the Lavon Affair. Later, he said that Egypt's President, Gamal Abdel Nasser, had agreed to spare their lives but then reneged to balance their deaths with members of Muslim Brotherhood.

=== Political service ===
Orbach contested Huntingdonshire in the 1931 election and Willesden East in 1935 and in a 1938 by-election. In 1937 he was elected to the London County Council, representing St Pancras South West.

Orbach was elected Member of Parliament for Willesden East in 1945, until his defeat in 1959, and for Stockport South from 1964 until Parliament dissolved for the 1979 general election; he died two weeks later, nine days before polling day. His successor was Thomas McNally.

== Personal life and death ==
In 1935, Orbach married Ruth Hubsch, an American, who later taught English to refugees from Nazi Germany. She was chairman of Pioneer Women (later renamed British Na'amat). She died in 1983.

Maurice Orbach died age 76 on 24 April 1979.

Daughter Susie is a psychotherapist, writer and co-founder of The Women's Therapy Centre in London. Son Laurence taught history at Columbia University, New York, before founding Quarto Publishing in London in 1976 and was chairman and CEO of The Quarto Group, Inc.

== Legacy ==
At his death in 1979, the Jewish Telegraphic Agency called him a "prominent leader of Anglo Jewry" and stated "a stalwart Zionist, he was a founder of the Labour Friends of Israel."

In 2010 The Guardian referred to him as "a self-proclaimed Labour Zionist who had conspicuously failed to support Israel during the Suez Crisis."

== Collections ==
Orbach collected much of the material found in the Trades Advisory Council Archive, deposited at University College London. The archive contains papers relating to the activities of the Council and additional material relating to concerns the organisation responded to, particularly antisemitic and antifacist literature.

== Work ==
Books

- Austria, 1946 (1946)

Parliament of the United Kingdom
Preceded by Samuel Hammersley	Member of Parliament for Willesden East; 1945–1959	Succeeded by Trevor Skeet
Preceded by Harold Macdonald Steward	Member of Parliament for Stockport South; 1964–1979	Succeeded by Tom McNally
