= Leader of the Liberal Party (UK) =

Political position in the Liberal Party of the UK (1859–1988)

The Liberal Party was formally established in 1859 and existed until merging with the Social Democratic Party in 1988 to create the Liberal Democrats.

== Leadership selection 1859–1969 ==
Before the adoption of the 1969 constitution of the party, the party was led by the prime minister or the most recent politically active prime minister from the party. In the absence of one of these, the leaders in the House of Lords and House of Commons were of equal status and jointly led the party.

When a new leader was required, with the party in government, the monarch selected him by appointing someone as prime minister. However, in 1916 David Lloyd George, with the support of a minority of the Liberal MPs, formed a coalition government. H. H. Asquith, the former prime minister, remained as Liberal Party leader. Asquith retained the leadership until his health failed in 1926, including periods when he was not in the Commons or was a peer. He was the last leader of the whole party under the original arrangements for leadership.

When no overall party leader was a member of a House and a new leader was required in opposition, a leader emerged and was approved by party members in that House. From 1919 onward, the Chairman of the Liberal Parliamentary Party, elected by MPs, functioned as the leader in the House of Commons. This required all the leaders after Asquith to retain their seat in order to continue as leader. After 1926 the leader in the House of Commons was clearly pre-eminent over the leader in the House of Lords.

In 1931 Lloyd George was leader in the House of Commons, but he was ill when negotiations led to the formation of the National Government. Sir Herbert Samuel, who had been the deputy leader, was effectively the leader of the mainstream party from the time when he entered the government. This was made formal after the 1931 general election.

== Leadership selection 1969–1988 ==
Under the original provisions of the 1969 party constitution, the MPs elected one of their number to be Leader of the Liberal Party. This was the same system as that used for the last MP only contested leadership election in 1967, when Jeremy Thorpe became leader after a vote split between three candidates of 6-3-3.

As the number of Liberal MPs was very small (between 6 and 14 during the period the MPs retained the sole power of election) party members argued for a wider franchise. Prior to the leadership election of 1976, all members were given a vote in an electoral college based on allocating electoral votes to constituency associations (which were then divided proportionately to the votes of the members of the association). The candidates were required to be members of the House of Commons, nominated by a quarter of the MPs. The electoral college system was only used once, when David Steel was elected leader.

== Lists of Liberal Party leaders ==
=== Leaders of the Liberal Party ===
Name	Portrait	Constituency/Title	Took office	Left office	Prime Minister
Henry John Temple, 3rd Viscount Palmerston		Tiverton	12 June 1859	18 October 1865	himself
John Russell, 1st Earl Russell		1st Earl Russell	29 October 1865	25 December 1867	himself 1865–66
John Russell, 1st Earl Russell		1st Earl Russell	29 October 1865	25 December 1867	Earl of Derby 1866–68
William Ewart Gladstone		Greenwich	25 December 1867	3 February 1875	Earl of Derby 1866–68
William Ewart Gladstone		Greenwich	25 December 1867	3 February 1875	Benjamin Disraeli 1868
William Ewart Gladstone		Greenwich	25 December 1867	3 February 1875	himself 1868–74
William Ewart Gladstone		Greenwich	25 December 1867	3 February 1875	Benjamin Disraeli 1874–80
Vacant; Leader of Lords 2nd Earl Granville; Leader of Commons Marquess of Hartington			3 February 1875	23 April 1880	Benjamin Disraeli 1874–80
William Ewart Gladstone		Midlothian	23 April 1880	2 March 1894	himself 1880–85
William Ewart Gladstone		Midlothian	23 April 1880	2 March 1894	Marquess of Salisbury 1885–86
William Ewart Gladstone		Midlothian	23 April 1880	2 March 1894	himself 1886
William Ewart Gladstone		Midlothian	23 April 1880	2 March 1894	Marquess of Salisbury 1886–92
William Ewart Gladstone		Midlothian	23 April 1880	2 March 1894	himself 1892–94
Archibald Primrose, 5th Earl of Rosebery		5th Earl of Rosebery	5 March 1894	6 October 1896	himself 1894–95
Archibald Primrose, 5th Earl of Rosebery		5th Earl of Rosebery	5 March 1894	6 October 1896	Marquess of Salisbury 1895–1902
Vacant; Leader of Lords 1st Earl of Kimberley 1897–1902; 5th Earl Spencer 1902–05; Leader of Commons William Vernon Harcourt 1896–98; Sir Henry Campbell-Bannerman 1898–1905			6 October 1896	3 December 1905	Marquess of Salisbury 1895–1902
Vacant; Leader of Lords 1st Earl of Kimberley 1897–1902; 5th Earl Spencer 1902–05; Leader of Commons William Vernon Harcourt 1896–98; Sir Henry Campbell-Bannerman 1898–1905			6 October 1896	3 December 1905	Arthur Balfour 1902–05
Sir Henry Campbell-Bannerman		Stirling Burghs	5 December 1905	3 April 1908	himself
H. H. Asquith		East Fife	5 April 1908	25 November 1918	himself 1908–16
H. H. Asquith		East Fife	5 April 1908	25 November 1918	David Lloyd George 1916–22
Sir Donald Maclean (interim leader)		Peebles and South Midlothian	3 February 1919	12 February 1920	David Lloyd George 1916–22
H. H. Asquith		Paisley (1920–1924); 1st Earl of Oxford and Asquith (1925–1926)	12 February 1920	15 October 1926	David Lloyd George 1916–22
H. H. Asquith		Paisley (1920–1924); 1st Earl of Oxford and Asquith (1925–1926)	12 February 1920	15 October 1926	Bonar Law 1922–23
H. H. Asquith		Paisley (1920–1924); 1st Earl of Oxford and Asquith (1925–1926)	12 February 1920	15 October 1926	Stanley Baldwin 1923–24
H. H. Asquith		Paisley (1920–1924); 1st Earl of Oxford and Asquith (1925–1926)	12 February 1920	15 October 1926	Ramsay MacDonald 1924
H. H. Asquith		Paisley (1920–1924); 1st Earl of Oxford and Asquith (1925–1926)	12 February 1920	15 October 1926	Stanley Baldwin 1924–29
Leaders of the Liberal Party in the House of Commons					Stanley Baldwin 1924–29
David Lloyd George		Caernarvon Boroughs	2 December 1924	7 October 1931	Stanley Baldwin 1924–29
David Lloyd George		Caernarvon Boroughs	2 December 1924	7 October 1931	Ramsay MacDonald 1929–35
Sir Herbert Samuel		Darwen	4 November 1931	25 October 1935	Ramsay MacDonald 1929–35
Sir Archibald Sinclair, Bt		Caithness and Sutherland	26 November 1935	26 July 1945	Stanley Baldwin 1935–37
Sir Archibald Sinclair, Bt		Caithness and Sutherland	26 November 1935	26 July 1945	Neville Chamberlain 1937–40
Sir Archibald Sinclair, Bt		Caithness and Sutherland	26 November 1935	26 July 1945	Winston Churchill 1940–45
Clement Davies		Montgomeryshire	2 August 1945	5 November 1956	Clement Attlee 1945–51
Clement Davies		Montgomeryshire	2 August 1945	5 November 1956	Winston Churchill 1951–55
Clement Davies		Montgomeryshire	2 August 1945	5 November 1956	Anthony Eden 1955–57
Jo Grimond		Orkney and Shetland	5 November 1956	17 January 1967	Anthony Eden 1955–57
Jo Grimond		Orkney and Shetland	5 November 1956	17 January 1967	Harold Macmillan 1957–63
Jo Grimond		Orkney and Shetland	5 November 1956	17 January 1967	Alec Douglas-Home 1963–64
Jo Grimond		Orkney and Shetland	5 November 1956	17 January 1967	Harold Wilson 1964–70
Jeremy Thorpe		North Devon	18 January 1967	1969	Harold Wilson 1964–70
Leaders of the Liberal Party elected under the 1969 Constitution					Harold Wilson 1964–70
Jeremy Thorpe		North Devon	1969	10 May 1976	Harold Wilson 1964–70
Jeremy Thorpe		North Devon	1969	10 May 1976	Edward Heath 1970–74
Jeremy Thorpe		North Devon	1969	10 May 1976	Harold Wilson 1974–76
Jo Grimond (interim leader)		Orkney and Shetland	12 May 1976	7 July 1976	James Callaghan 1976–79
David Steel		Roxburgh, Selkirk and Peebles (1967–1983); Tweeddale, Ettrick and Lauderdale (1983–1988)	7 July 1976	3 March 1988	James Callaghan 1976–79
David Steel		Roxburgh, Selkirk and Peebles (1967–1983); Tweeddale, Ettrick and Lauderdale (1983–1988)	7 July 1976	3 March 1988	Margaret Thatcher 1979–90

=== Leaders of the Liberal Party in the House of Commons ===
Name	Constituency	Took office	Left office
Henry John Temple, 3rd Viscount Palmerston	Tiverton	12 June 1859	18 October 1865
William Ewart Gladstone	Greenwich	29 October 1865	3 February 1875
Spencer Cavendish, Marquess of Hartington	Radnor	3 February 1875	23 April 1880
William Ewart Gladstone	Midlothian	23 April 1880	2 March 1894
Sir William Harcourt	Derby (1894–1895); West Monmouthshire (1895–1898)	5 March 1894	14 December 1898
Sir Henry Campbell-Bannerman	Stirling Burghs	6 February 1899	3 April 1908
H. H. Asquith	East Fife	5 April 1908	25 November 1918
Sir Donald Maclean	Peebles and South Midlothian	3 February 1919	12 February 1920
H. H. Asquith	Paisley	12 February 1920	9 October 1924
David Lloyd George	Caernarvon Boroughs	2 December 1924	7 October 1931
Sir Herbert Samuel	Darwen	4 November 1931	25 October 1935
Sir Archibald Sinclair, 4th Baronet	Caithness and Sutherland	26 November 1935	15 June 1945
Clement Davies	Montgomeryshire	2 August 1945	5 November 1956
Jo Grimond	Orkney and Shetland	5 November 1956	17 January 1967
Jeremy Thorpe	North Devon	18 January 1967	10 May 1976
Jo Grimond	Orkney and Shetland	12 May 1976	7 July 1976
David Steel	Roxburgh, Selkirk and Peebles (1967–1983); Tweeddale, Ettrick and Lauderdale (1983–1988)	7 July 1976	3 March 1988

=== Leaders of the Liberal Party in the House of Lords ===
Name	Took office	Left office
Granville Leveson-Gower, 2nd Earl Granville	1859	1865
John Russell, 1st Earl Russell	1865	1868
Granville George Leveson-Gower, 2nd Earl Granville	1868	1891
John Wodehouse, 1st Earl of Kimberley	1891	1894
Archibald Primrose, 5th Earl of Rosebery	1894	1896
John Wodehouse, 1st Earl of Kimberley	1897	1902
John Spencer, 5th Earl Spencer	1902	1905
George Robinson, 1st Marquess of Ripon	1905	1908
Robert Crewe-Milnes, 1st Earl of Crewe (Marquess of Crewe from 1911)	1908	1923
Edward Grey, 1st Viscount Grey of Fallodon	1923	1924
William Lygon, 7th Earl Beauchamp	1924	1931
Rufus Isaacs, 1st Marquess of Reading	1931	1935
Robert Crewe-Milnes, 1st Marquess of Crewe	1936	1944
Herbert Samuel, 1st Viscount Samuel	1944	1955
Philip Rea, 2nd Baron Rea	1955	1967
Frank Byers, Baron Byers	1967	1984
Nancy Seear, Baroness Seear	1984	1988

== See also ==
- List of United Kingdom Whig and allied party leaders, 1801–1859
- Leader of the Liberal Democrats
- Leader of the Liberal Democrats in the House of Lords
- Liberalism in the United Kingdom
- Politics of the United Kingdom
