= Keith Fraser (police officer) =

British senior police officer (born 1965)

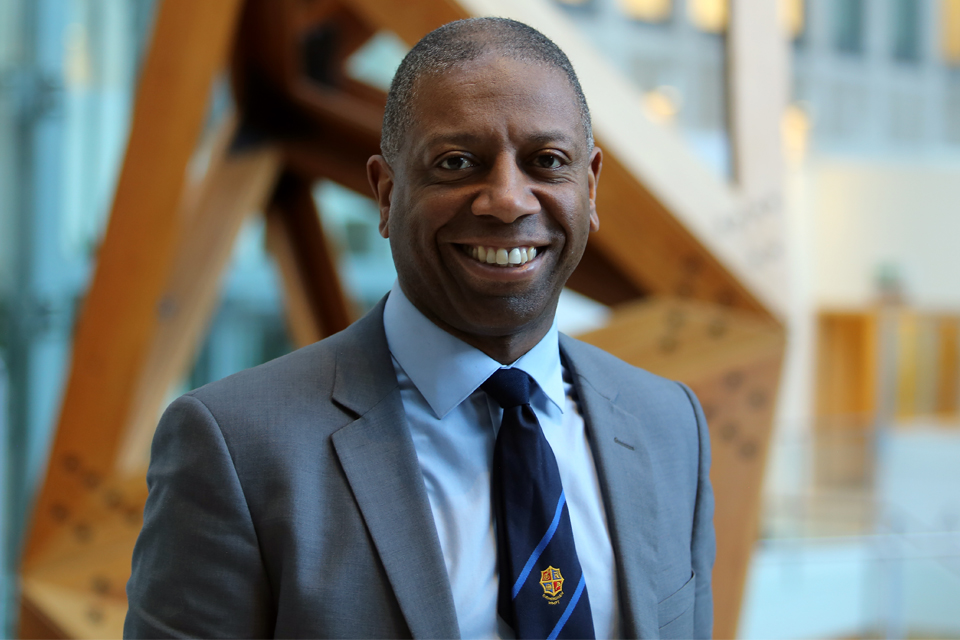
- Fraser in 2020

Chair of the Youth Justice Board
- In office April 2020 – January 2026
- Appointed by: Robert Buckland
- Preceded by: Charlie Taylor
- Succeeded by: Phil Bowen

Personal details
- Born: Birmingham, England

Keith Fraser is a former British police officer, with a career spanning more than 30 years. He was Chair of the Youth Justice Board from 2020 until 2026.

== Background ==
Fraser was born in Birmingham, England, the son of a bus driver and a secretary who migrated to Britain from Jamaica in the 1960s.

== Career ==
Fraser began working for the Metropolitan Police in 1985 and in 2005 joined West Midlands Police, where he rose through the ranks to become by the time of his retirement in 2017 the only serving black Superintendent in the force.

Fraser was appointed Chair of the Youth Justice Board (YJB) on 14 April 2020 by the Lord Chancellor and Secretary of State for Justice, Robert Buckland.

In 2020-21 he served as a commissioner on the UK Government's Commission on Race and Ethnic Disparities.
