= Leader of the Liberal Democrats in the House of Lords =

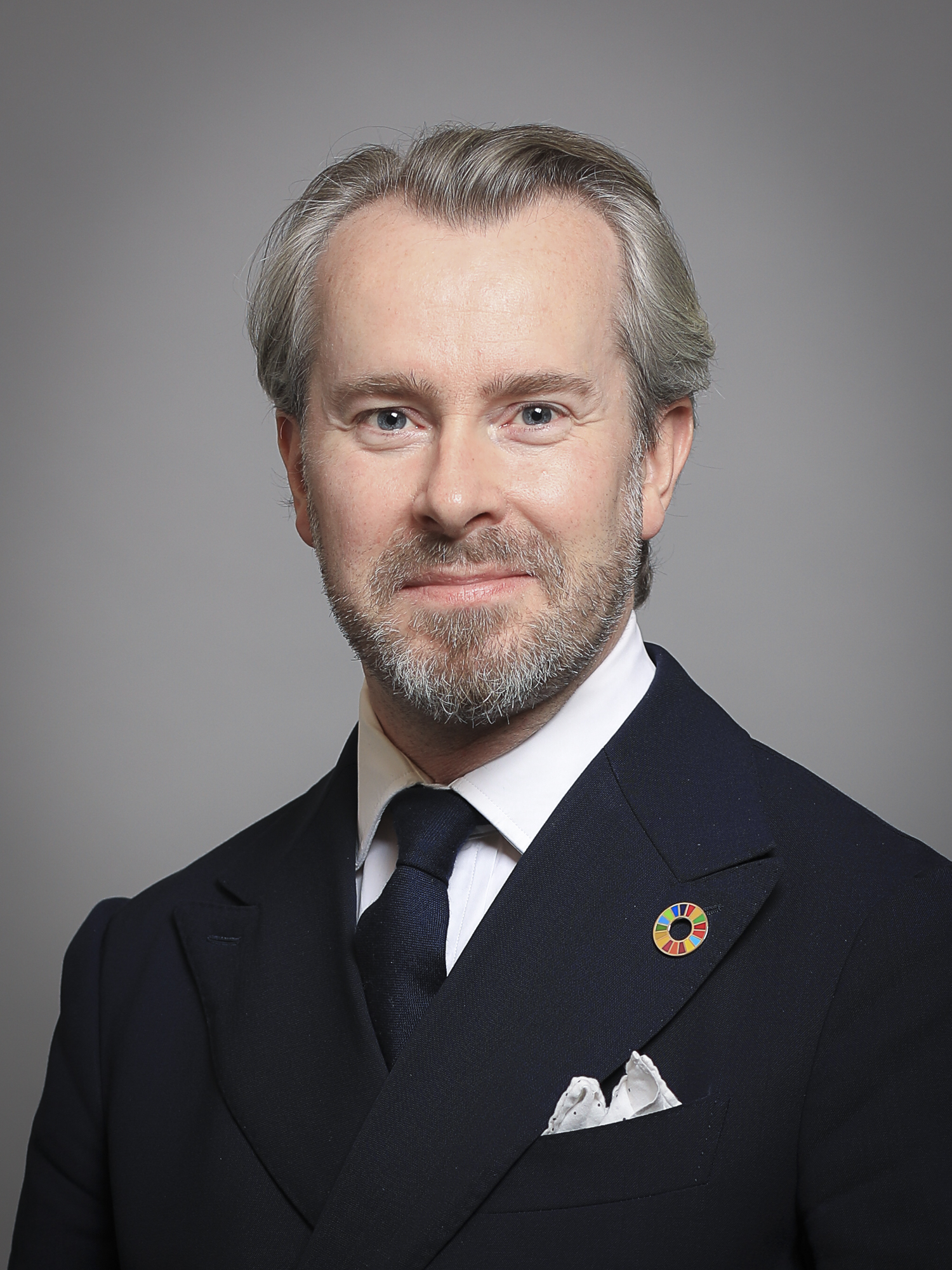
- Incumbent; The Lord Purvis of Tweed since 25 July 2025
- Inaugural holder: The Lord Jenkins of Hillhead
- Formation: 3 March 1988

The Liberal Democrat peers elect the Leader of the Liberal Democrats in the House of Lords. Until the election of Lord Wallace of Tankerness in October 2013, all previous leaders had been members of the Labour Party who left to form the Social Democratic Party in 1981 before merging with the Liberal Party in 1988.

== List of Liberal Democrat Leaders in the House of Lords ==
Leader in the House of Lords
#	Leader	Took office	Left office	Party Leader
1	The Lord Jenkins of Hillhead (Roy Jenkins)	16 July 1988	19 December 1997	Paddy Ashdown
2	The Lord Rodgers of Quarry Bank (William Rodgers)	19 December 1997	7 June 2001	Paddy Ashdown
2	The Lord Rodgers of Quarry Bank (William Rodgers)	19 December 1997	7 June 2001	Charles Kennedy
3	The Baroness Williams of Crosby (Shirley Williams)	7 June 2001	24 November 2004	Charles Kennedy
4	The Lord McNally (Tom McNally)	24 November 2004	15 October 2013	Charles Kennedy
4	The Lord McNally (Tom McNally)	24 November 2004	15 October 2013	Menzies Campbell; Vince Cable (acting)
4	The Lord McNally (Tom McNally)	24 November 2004	15 October 2013	Nick Clegg
5	The Lord Wallace of Tankerness (Jim Wallace)	15 October 2013	13 September 2016	Nick Clegg
5	The Lord Wallace of Tankerness (Jim Wallace)	15 October 2013	13 September 2016	Tim Farron
6	The Lord Newby (Dick Newby)	13 September 2016	24 July 2025	Tim Farron
6	The Lord Newby (Dick Newby)	13 September 2016	24 July 2025	Vince Cable; Jo Swinson
6	The Lord Newby (Dick Newby)	13 September 2016	24 July 2025	Ed Davey
7	The Lord Purvis of Tweed (Jeremy Purvis)	25 July 2025	Incumbent	Ed Davey

== See also ==
- List of United Kingdom Whig and allied party leaders, 1801–1859
- Leader of the Liberal Party (UK)
- Leader of the Liberal Democrats
