= Frances Done =

British public administrator

Chair of the Youth Justice Board
- In office February 2008 – March 2014
- Appointed by: Jack Straw
- Preceded by: Graham Robb (Interim)
- Succeeded by: Lord McNally

Personal details
- Born: May 6, 1950 (age 76) Bristol, England
- Education: University of Manchester

Frances Winifred Done, CBE, FCA (née Bishop; born 6 May 1950) is a British public administrator, accountant and former local politician.

== Early life ==
She was born in Bristol on 6 May 1950, one of the four daughters of the Labour politician Edward Stanley Bishop, Baron Bishopston, PC, JP (1920–1984), and his wife, Winifred Mary, née Bryant, JP.

== Career ==
Done was educated at the University of Manchester, graduating with a Bachelor of Arts degree (BA) in economics in 1971; she then began training as an accountant at KPMG. In 1976, she was appointed a Fellow of the Institute of Chartered Accountants in England and Wales. In 1988, she returned to KPMG as a senior manager in their public sector department, but in 1991 became Treasurer of the Rochdale Metropolitan Borough Council, serving until 1998 when she became Chief Executive. In 2000, she became Chief Executive of Manchester 2002, which was responsible for organising that city's Commonwealth Games. When that role expired in 2003, she became managing director for Local Government, Housing and Criminal Justice at the Audit Commission (2003–06), which made her ultimately responsible for the commission's inspections of local government organisations. She then spent a year as Interim Director-General of the Royal British Legion for the year 2006–07. She was then Chairman of the Youth Justice Board from 2008 to 2014, and has served as a Trustee of the Canal and River Trust (formerly the Waterways Trust) since 2003. In 2015, the Department for Communities and Local Government appointed her vice-chairman of the Birmingham Improvement Panel.

General election 1983: Manchester Withington
Party	Candidate	Votes	%	±%
Conservative	Fred Silvester	18,329	39.2	−8.1
Labour	Frances Done	15,956	34.2	−4.7
SDP	Bernard L. Lever	12,231	26.2	New
Independent	Michael Gibson	184	0.4	0.0
Majority		2,373	5.0	−3.4
Turnout		46,700	72.3	−2.4
Conservative hold		Swing	−3.4	

=== Honours ===
In the 2003 New Year Honours, Done was appointed a Commander of the Order of the British Empire "for services to the XVII Commonwealth Games".

== Personal life ==
In 1981, she married the political broadcaster Jim Hancock and has two sons.
