= Arnold Gridley, 1st Baron Gridley =

British Conservative politician

Arnold Babb Gridley, 1st Baron Gridley, KBE (16 July 1878 – 27 July 1965) was a British Conservative politician.

== Biography ==
Gridley was the son of Edward Gridley of Abbey Dore in Herefordshire. He worked as a consulting engineer but later turned to politics. In 1935 he was elected to the House of Commons for Stockport, a seat he held until the constituency was abolished in 1950, and then represented Stockport South from 1950 to 1955. The latter year he was raised to the peerage as Baron Gridley, of Stockport in the County Palatine of Chester.

Lord Gridley married Mabel, daughter of Oliver Hudson, in 1905. He died in July 1965, aged 87, and was succeeded in the barony by his eldest son Arnold.

== Arms ==
Coat of arms of Arnold Gridley, 1st Baron Gridley
Crest A wyvern Azure semee of lozenges Or, resting the dexter claw on a grid iron Gules. Escutcheon Gules three bendlets enhanced and in base a portcullis chained Or. Supporters On the dexter a wyvern Azure semee of lozenges Or on the sinister a lion Gules semee of grid irons Gold. Motto Devant Si Je Puis

Parliament of the United Kingdom
Preceded by Samuel Hammersley; Alan Dower	Member of Parliament for Stockport; 1935–1950; Served alongside: Norman Hulbert	Constituency abolished
New constituency	Member of Parliament for Stockport South; 1950–1955	Succeeded by Harold Steward
Peerage of the United Kingdom
New creation	Baron Gridley; 1955–1965	Succeeded by Arnold Hudson Gridley
