= Stockport South =

Parliamentary constituency in the United Kingdom, 1950–1983

- Former borough constituency for the House of Commons
- Boundary of Stockport South in Cheshire, boundaries 1974-83
- County: Cheshire

1950–1983
- Seats: one
- Created from: Stockport
- Replaced by: Stockport, Hazel Grove, Denton & Reddish

Stockport South was a borough constituency which returned one Member of Parliament (MP) to the House of Commons of the Parliament of the United Kingdom from 1950 until 1983.

== History ==
Under the Representation of the People Act 1948, which came into effect for the 1950 general election, the two-member parliamentary borough of Stockport was abolished and replaced by the single-member borough constituencies of Stockport North and Stockport South.

Further to the Third Periodic Review of Westminster constituencies, which followed the local government reorganisation implemented on 1 April 1974, the constituency was abolished for the 1983 general election, with most of the electorate going to form part of the new single-member Stockport constituency.

== Boundaries ==
1950-1955: The County Borough of Stockport wards of Cale Green, Davenport, Heaviley, Hempshaw Lane, Portwood, St Mary's, St Thomas's, Shaw Heath, and Vernon.

1955-1974: As above except the part of Bredbury ward added to the County Borough of Stockport by the Stockport (Extension) Order 1952, which was transferred from Cheadle (Statutory Instrument 1953–742).

1974-1983: The County Borough of Stockport wards of Adswood, Brinnington, Cale Green, Davenport, Heaviley, Little Moor, Manor, Offerton, and Vernon.

Boundaries adjusted to take account of revision of local authority wards.

From 1 April 1974 until the constituency was abolished for the 1983 general election, the constituency comprised parts of the Metropolitan Borough of Stockport in Greater Manchester, but its boundaries were unchanged.

On abolition, the majority of the constituency was re-combined with the majority of Stockport North to form the re-established constituency of Stockport. Northern-most parts (Brinnington) were included in the new constituency of Denton and Reddish, while eastern-most parts (Offerton) were transferred to Hazel Grove.

== Members of Parliament ==
Election	Member	Party	Notes
1950	Arnold Gridley	Conservative	Resigned January 1955 on being raised to the peerage
1955 by-election	Harold Steward	Conservative	
1964	Maurice Orbach	Labour	Announced retirement at 1979 general election, died 24 April
1979	Tom McNally	Labour	
1981	Tom McNally	SDP	
1983	constituency abolished: see Stockport & Denton and Reddish		

== Election results ==
=== Elections in the 1950s ===
General election 1950: Stockport South
Party	Candidate	Votes	%	±%
Conservative	Arnold Gridley	19,079	45.69	
Labour	H Ponsonby	16,897	40.47	
Liberal	Reginald Hewitt	5,778	13.84	
Majority		2,182	5.22	
Turnout		41,754	86.93	
Registered electors		48,032		
Conservative win (new seat)				

General election 1951: Stockport South
Party	Candidate	Votes	%	±%
Conservative	Arnold Gridley	22,075	54.17	+8.48
Labour	Frank Bibby	18,675	45.83	+5.36
Majority		3,400	8.34	+3.12
Turnout		40,750	84.17	−2.76
Registered electors		48,413		
Conservative hold		Swing	+1.56	

1955 Stockport South by-election: Stockport South
Party	Candidate	Votes	%	±%
Conservative	Harold Steward	16,321	54.26	+0.09
Labour	H Davies	13,758	45.73	−0.09
Majority		2,563	8.53	+0.19
Turnout		30,079		
Conservative hold		Swing	+0.09	

General election 1955: Stockport South
Party	Candidate	Votes	%	±%
Conservative	Harold Steward	20,698	55.48	+1.31
Labour	Ernie Roberts	16,612	44.52	−1.31
Majority		4,086	10.96	+2.63
Turnout		37,310	78.96	−5.21
Registered electors		47,251		
Conservative hold		Swing	+1.31	

General election 1959: Stockport South
Party	Candidate	Votes	%	±%
Conservative	Harold Steward	20,522	53.30	−2.18
Labour	Stan Orme	17,982	46.70	+2.18
Majority		2,540	6.60	−4.35
Turnout		38,504	81.46	+2.50
Registered electors		47,265		
Conservative hold		Swing	−2.18	

=== Elections in the 1960s ===
General election 1964: Stockport South
Party	Candidate	Votes	%	±%
Labour	Maurice Orbach	16,755	44.58	−2.12
Conservative	Harold Steward	13,718	35.50	−16.80
Liberal	Donald F Kerr	7,107	18.91	New
Majority		3,037	8.08	N/A
Turnout		37,580	81.78	+0.32
Registered electors		45,955		
Labour gain from Conservative		Swing	-2.12	

General election 1966: Stockport South
Party	Candidate	Votes	%	±%
Labour	Maurice Orbach	19,456	55.84	+11.26
Conservative	Clive Howson	15,387	44.16	+7.66
Majority		4,069	11.68	+3.60
Turnout		34,843	76.74	−5.04
Registered electors		45,406		
Labour hold		Swing	+1.80	

=== Elections in the 1970s ===
General election 1970: Stockport South
Party	Candidate	Votes	%	±%
Labour	Maurice Orbach	16,747	46.47	−9.37
Conservative	Clive Howson	14,679	40.73	−3.45
Liberal	Trevor Jones	4,613	12.80	New
Majority		2,068	5.74	−5.94
Turnout		36,039	73.29	−3.45
Registered electors		49,173		
Labour hold		Swing	-9.37	

General election February 1974: Stockport South
Party	Candidate	Votes	%	±%
Labour	Maurice Orbach	15,722	41.89	−4.58
Conservative	David Edwards	12,624	33.64	−7.09
Liberal	Christopher Carter	9,182	24.47	+11.67
Majority		3,098	8.25	+2.51
Turnout		37,528	79.24	+8.26
Registered electors		47,360		
Labour hold		Swing	-4.58	

General election October 1974: Stockport South
Party	Candidate	Votes	%	±%
Labour	Maurice Orbach	16,281	45.86	+3.97
Conservative	William Legge	12,061	33.97	+0.33
Liberal	Christopher Carter	7,160	20.17	−4.30
Majority		4,220	11.89	+3.63
Turnout		35,502	74.30	−4.94
Registered electors		47,782		
Labour hold		Swing	+1.82	

General election 1979: Stockport South
Party	Candidate	Votes	%	±%
Labour	Tom McNally	16,910	45.06	−0.80
Conservative	Frederic Skidmore	15,785	42.06	+8.09
Liberal	John Quayle	4,458	11.88	−8.29
National Front	Robert Murphy	374	1.00	New
Majority		1,125	3.00	−8.89
Turnout		37,527	77.35	+3.05
Registered electors		48,513		
Labour hold		Swing	-4.44	

== See also ==
- History of parliamentary constituencies and boundaries in Cheshire
