= Youth Justice Board =

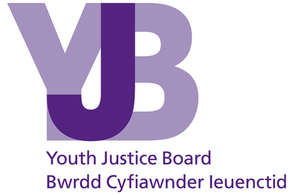
- Formation: 30 September 1998; 27 years ago
- Legal status: Non-departmental public body
- Headquarters: London
- Region served: England and Wales
- CEO: Steph Roberts-Bibby
- Chairman: Phil Bowen
- Website: www.gov.uk/government/organisations/youth-justice-board-for-england-and-wales

The Youth Justice Board for England and Wales (YJB) (Welsh: Bwrdd Cyfiawnder Ieuenctid) is a non-departmental public body created by the Crime and Disorder Act 1998 to oversee the youth justice system for England and Wales. Its purposes are set out in section 41 of that Act.

It is sponsored by the Ministry of Justice, and its board members are appointed by the Secretary of State for Justice. A key function of the Board is to set policy on youth offending and oversee and the Youth Offending Teams.

== Functions ==
The YJB's primary function is to monitor the operation of the youth justice system and the provision of youth justice services. Within England and Wales it is responsible for:

- using information and evidence to form an expert view of how to get the best outcomes for children who offend and for victims of crime
- advising the Secretary of State for Justice and those working in youth justice services about how well the system is operating, and how improvements can be made
- identifying and sharing best practice
- promoting the voice of the child
- commissioning research and publishing information in connection with good practice
- monitoring the youth justice system and the provision of youth justice services
- making grants, with the approval of the Secretary of State, for the purposes of the operation of the youth justice system and services
- providing information technology related assistance for the operation of the youth justice system and services. The main vehicle for this is the Youth Justice Application Framework (YJAF) which is a case management system collecting data utilised by the YJB for its Business Intelligence & Insights function, and information exchange between Youth Justice Services and the Secure Estate regarding children.

== Board members ==
Members of the YJB's Board are appointed by the Secretary of State for Justice. The following people are current YJB Board Members:

- Phil Bowen (chair)
- Jacob Sakil
- Karin Phillips MBE
- Martin Pratt CBE
- Robert Sullivan
- Susannah Hancock

The YJB's current Chief Executive is Stephanie Roberts-Bibby. The organisation has about 100 staff.

== Retired chairs ==
- September 1998–June 2003: Lord Norman Warner
- June 2003–April 2004: Sir Charles Pollard (Acting)
- April 2004–January 2007: Rod Morgan
- February 2007–February 2008: Graham Robb (Interim)
- February 2008–March 2014: Frances Done
- March 2014–February 2017: Lord Tom McNally
- March 2017–April 2020: Charlie Taylor
- April 2020–January 2026: Keith Fraser
