= Thyssen =

Thyssen is a Low Frankish and Dutch patronymic surname. It is derived from the common given name Thijs, a short form of Mathijs (Matthew). The Dutch digraph ij and the y ("ij" without dots) were used interchangeably until the surname spelling fixations around 1810. While Thijssen is the more common form in the Netherlands, "Thyssen" prevails elsewhere. It may refer to:

== People ==
- Craig Thyssen (born 1984), South African cricketer
- Greta Thyssen (1933–2018), Danish film actress and model
- Ingrid Thyssen (born 1956), German javelin thrower
- Marianne Thyssen (born 1956), Belgian politician and EU Commissioner
- Nicole Thyssen (born 1988), Dutch tennis player
- Ole Thyssen (born 1944), Danish philosopher and sociologist
- Thyssen family, an industrialist family originating in Aachen, with many notable members including:
  - Friedrich Thyssen (1804–1877), German banker
  - August Thyssen (1842–1926), German founder of the Thyssen steel company, son of Friedrich
  - Joseph Thyssen (1844–1915), German industrialist, son of Friedrich
  - Fritz Thyssen (1873–1951), head of the Thyssen mining and steelmaking company, son of August
  - Heinrich Thyssen later Heinrich Freiherr Thyssen-Bornemisza (1875–1947), German-Hungarian entrepreneur and art collector, son of August
  - Margit Thyssen, baroness Batthyány (1911–1989), daughter of Heinrich, associated with the Massacre of Rechnitz
  - Baron Hans Heinrich Thyssen-Bornemisza (1921–2002), founder of the Thyssen-Bornemisza Museum, son of Heinrich
  - Francesca Thyssen-Bornemisza (born 1958), Swiss art collector and by marriage Francesca von Habsburg, daughter of Hans Heinrich
  - Tita Thyssen née Carmen Cervera (born 1943), Spanish model and art collector, fifth wife of Hans Heinrich
  - Bodo Thyssen (1918–2004), German industrialist and medical doctor, grandson of Joseph

Thysse

- Andre Thysse (1968–2021), South African heavyweight boxer

Thyssens

- Germaine Thyssens-Valentin (1902–1987), Dutch-born French pianist

== Other ==
- Thyssen AG, steel company founded by August Thyssen, with successors and subsidiaries including:
  - ThyssenKrupp, one of the world's largest steel producers, formed by merger of the Thyssen and Krupp steel companies

== See also ==
- Thissen
- Thiessen (disambiguation)
- Thijssen
- Thys
