= Bank voor Handel en Scheepvaart =

Bank voor Handel en Scheepvaart N.V. was a Dutch bank that provided financial services for the House of Orange-Nassau and German industrialist and financier of Adolf Hitler, Fritz Thyssen. It was founded in 1916 by August Thyssen. One of its subsidiaries was the American bank Union Banking Corporation. The funds for Hitler's Brown House were routed through Bank voor Handel en Scheepvaart and Union Banking Corporation. Thyssen also routed funds meant for South America through Bank voor Handel en Scheepvaart and then Union Banking Corporation. In August 1946, the clandestine Operation Juliana was organised to re-appropriate the Orange-Nassau stock portfolio that had been transferred to Berlin. Prior to the Second World War, Thyssen used Bank voor Handel en Scheepvaart to route iron imports destined for Vereingte Stahlwerke AG into Germany. The bank was later converted into TBG AG by heir Hans Heinrich Thyssen-Bornemisza.

== See also ==
- List of banks in the Netherlands
