= Union Banking Corporation =

Former US-based investment bank

- Industry: Banking
- Founder: Prescott Bush

The Union Banking Corporation (UBC) was a New York investment bank incorporated in 1924 in the United States. During World War II, under the U.S. Trading with the Enemy Act, the United States government seized the bank's assets pending investigation of the bank's business involving a former party member of the Nazi government in Germany, Fritz Thyssen. The now-former U.S. Senator Prescott Bush was a founding member and is included among its seven directors whose entire collective shareholdings in Union Banking Corp. were shares wholly owned by, and held on behalf of, the Thyssen empire's Bank voor Handel en Scheepvaart in Rotterdam.

== Seizure ==
According to an October 5, 1942 report from the Office of Alien Property Custodian, Union Banking was owned by Bank voor Handel en Scheepvaart N.V., a Dutch bank. The memo from August 18, 1941, states "My investigation produced no evidence as to the ownership of this Dutch bank."

The Dutch bank was alleged to be affiliated with United Steel Works, a German company. Fritz Thyssen and his brother, Heinrich Thyssen-Bornemisza, had the Dutch bank and the steel firm as part of their business and financial empire according to the government agency. Fritz Thyssen resigned from the Council of State after November 9, 1938 Kristallnacht, was arrested in 1940, and spent the remainder of the war in a sanatorium and in concentration camps. The APC documents say "Whether any or all part of the funds held by Union Banking Corporation, or companies associated with it, belong to Fritz Thyssen could not be established in this investigation." The assets were held by the government for the duration of the war, then returned afterward; UBC dissolved in the 1950s.

== See also ==
- War seizures of Nazi assets
