= Dießl =

Dießl or Diessl is a German language surname. Like the related Diesel it belongs to the group of family names derived from given names – in this case either from the name of Semitic origin Matthias (cf. Thyssen, Thiessen, Thijssen) or from several compound names of Germanic origin with the beginning element theudo (e. g. Dietrich, Dietmar, Dieter) – and may refer to:

- Gustav Diessl (1899–1948), Austrian film and stage actor
- Matthias Dießl (born 1975), German politician
- Walter Dießl (born 1943), Austrian athlete

== See also ==
- Diesel (disambiguation)
