= Bodo Thyssen =

German industrialist and medical doctor

Bodo Thyssen (1918–2004) was a German industrialist and medical doctor, son of Hans Thyssen and grandson of Josef Thyssen, the younger brother of August Thyssen.

His businesses included Telefonbau & Normalzeit, Thyssen-Heizkessel and Melderwerke.

In 1969 he married Renate Thyssen-Henne (née Kerkhoff), whom he later divorced, without issue, though his stepdaughter Gabriele and stepson Joachim had taken his surname. At the beginning of the 1970s, Bodo Thyssen and his wife Renate Thyssen established the "Thyssen Privatklinik" in Prien by the Chiemsee lake.

Thyssen died in 2004.

== See also ==
- Thyssen
- Thyssen family
