= Heinrich Thyssen =

German-Hungarian entrepreneur and art collector

Heinrich Thyssen (31 October 1875 – 26 June 1947), after 22 June 1907 Heinrich, Baron Thyssen-Bornemisza de Kászon et Impérfalva, was a Hungarian-German entrepreneur and art collector.

== Biography ==
Thyssen was born in Mülheim an der Ruhr, the second son of German industrialist August Thyssen. Heinrich Thyssen had abandoned Germany as a young man and, after studying chemistry at the University of Heidelberg and philosophy at the University of London and obtaining a doctorate, he settled in Hungary in 1905 and married Baroness Margit Bornemisza de Kászon et Impérfalva (Csetény, Veszprém, 23 July 1887 – Locarno, 17 April 1971) in Vienna or Budapest on 4 January 1906 and became a citizen of Austria-Hungary.

In Vienna on 22 June 1907 he was adopted by his father-in-law, Gábor, Baron Bornemisza de Kászon et Impérfalva (Kolozsvár, 20 April 1859 – Budapest, 21 April 1915), the King's chamberlain who, having no sons of his own, adopted Heinrich. Franz Joseph I of Austria, King-Emperor of Austria-Hungary granted him the hereditary title and rank of a baron in the Hungarian nobility in 1907. His mother-in-law was English American Mathilde Louise Price (Wilmington, New Castle County, Delaware, 14 March 1865 – Locarno, 19 January 1959 and married at Vienna on 16 May 1883), who was a sister of Anne Hollingsworth Price (wife of Friedrich Wilhelm, Prince of Ardeck) and they were descendants of the Winthrop family, and related to Daniel M. Frost and John Kerry.

The couple lived at the castle of Rohonc until after World War I and the uprising of Béla Kun, when they fled and moved to The Hague in the Netherlands from where they directed some of the Thyssen commercial and industrial interests, including the Bank voor Handel en Scheepvaart. In 1926 he had refused to participate in the Vereinigte Stahlwerke AG, founded by his elder brother Fritz Thyssen, although becoming a board member, but kept his own inherited wealth, including his father's foreign investments and some German companies apart from the Thyssen steelworks, in a separate organization, the August Thyssensche Unternehmungen des In- und Auslandes, GmbH, today Thyssen-Bornemisza Group Holdings N.V. (TBG).

In 1932, he moved to Lugano and started to enlarge his art collection, to which he had already been adding new items since the 1920s. His preference was for classic and modern painting, although he disliked 20th-century painting. Among other works, he bought from the estate of the American banker Otto Hermann Kahn, Maecenas of the Metropolitan Opera of New York, in 1935, the painting Portrait of a Knight by Vittore Carpaccio, which currently remains in the collection. In Europe he bought from many famous collections other famous paintings such as the portrait of Henry VIII of England by Hans Holbein the Younger from the Spencer collection.

Thyssen divorced his first wife on 17 March 1932 and married Else Zarske, known as Maud (born in Thorn on 17 April 1909), at Brussels on 29 August 1932. Maud was maintaining an affair with Georgian polo player Alexis Mdivani which was revealed in 1935 following her car accident in which Mdivani died. They divorced in 1937 without issue. He married his third wife, Gunhild von Fabrice (born in Magdeburg on 5 March 1908) in Berlin on 15 November 1937. He died in Lugano in 1947.

== Children ==
His children by first marriage were:

- Henrik Gábor István Ágost Freiherr Thyssen-Bornemisza de Kászon et Impérfalva (Rechnitz (Rohonc), 26 July 1907 – New York, New York County, New York, 23 January 1981), married firstly in Corpus Christi, Nueces County, Texas, 27 April 1929 Elisabeth Clarkson, without issue, married secondly in Budapest, 24 May 1932 Ilona Kugler (Pilismarót, 20 March 1905 – Munich, 26 September 1992), without issue, married thirdly Ingeborg Muller, one step-daughter Birgit.
- Margit Gabriella Lujza Freiin Thyssen-Bornemisza de Kászon et Impérfalva (Rechnitz (Rohonc), 21/22 June 1911 – Lugano-Castagnola, 15 September 1989), "The Killer Countess", married in Gandria, Ticino, 17 June 1933 Count Johann Maria Josef Ladislaus Batthyány von Németújvár (Kittsee (Köpcsény), 21 April 1910 – Lugano-Castagnola, 16 July 1985), third son of László, 7th Prince of Batthyany-Strattmann. During the final days of World War II, on 24 March 1945, she hosted a party for SS officers, Gestapo leaders, Nazi Youth, and local collaborators at the Thyssens' castle at Rechnitz during which 200 Jews were murdered. They had:
  - Johann (Iván) Ladislaus Heinrich Maria Graf Batthyány-Strattmann de Német-Ujvar (Vienna, 16 May 1934 – Pressbaum, 26 August 1967), unmarried and without issue.
  - Robert Christof Heinrich Maria Graf Batthyány-Strattmann de Német-Ujvar (Vienna, 12 July 1935 –), married at Hamburg, 18 August 1966 Christine Riechert (Nordhausen, 6 February 1938 –), daughter of Hans Joachim Riechert and wife Elfriede Brodthage, and had:
    - Tatiana Christina Maria Gräfin Batthyány-Strattmann de Német-Ujvar (Hamburg, 26 June 1968 –), married civilly at Lütjenburg, Holstein, 28 May 1993 and religiously at Rechnitz, Burgenland, 26 June 1993 Konrad Graf von Waldersee (b. Waterneverstorf, 27 March 1957), sixth grandson in male line of Leopold III, Duke of Anhalt-Dessau, and had:
      - Henry Graf von Waldersee
      - Laura Gräfin von Waldersee (29 January 1998 –)
      - László Graf von Waldersee (London, 16 February 2000 –)
    - Iván Christof Graf Batthyány-Strattmann de Német-Ujvar (Hamburg, 2 March 1979 –)
- Gabriella Vilma Hedvig Mária Freiin Thyssen-Bornemisza de Kászon et Impérfalva (Rechnitz (Rohonc), 20 December 1915 – 1999), married in Gandria, Ticino, 1 September 1938 Adolf Willem Carel Baron Bentinck (Ede, 3 September 1905 – Paris, 7 March 1970), and had:
  - Henriette Louise Maria Baronesse Bentinck (London, 30 January 1949 – 29 November 2010), married firstly at London, 13 June 1967 and divorced in 1973 Spencer Compton, 7th Marquess of Northampton (2 April 1946 –) and had issue, married secondly and divorced Richard Thompson, and married thirdly in Paris, 1 July 1978 Serge Boissevain (Neuilly, 10 July 1947 – 3 January 2011)
  - Carel Johannes Baron Bentinck (1957 –), married firstly and divorced in 1996 Nora Picciotto, without issue, and married secondly and divorced Lisa Hogan, and had issue.
- Hans Henrik (Hans Heinrich "Heini") Ágost Gábor Tasso Freiherr Thyssen-Bornemisza de Kászon et Impérfalva (1921–2002), who continued his collection before he sold it in 1993 to the Spanish government for $350 million.

== See also ==
- Thyssen
- Thyssen family
- Thyssen-Bornemisza Museum
- Isle of the Dead (painting)
