= Renate Thyssen-Henne =

German entrepreneur (born 1939)

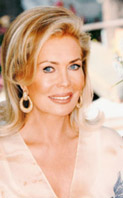
- Born: Renate Kerkhoff; 20 June 1939 (age 87); Bottrop, Nazi Germany
- Children: Inaara Aga Khan

Renate Thyssen-Henne (née Kerkhoff; born 20 June 1939 in Bottrop) is a German entrepreneur.

== Life ==
Thyssen-Henne descends from the Westphalian Kerkhoff family of entrepreneurs (wood sawmill, gravel pits, textile and clothing company), founded by her grandfather Hermann Kerkhoff. After completing her secondary school education, Renate Kerkhoff completed an internship at a Bottrop travel agency. At 18, she was hired as a secretary by the Frankfurt branch of the US-based Honeywell Corporation. She also took courses in business English, business administration, and management and worked as a model.

== Work ==
At the age of 20, Kerkhoff founded her first company, which four years later already employed 150 people. At 25, she founded the restaurant chain "Zum Gumpelmann" with 12 branches in Aachen, Frankfurt, Düsseldorf, Cologne, Heidelberg, and other German cities.

In the early 1970s, with her third husband, Bodo Thyssen of the prominent Thyssen family, she founded the now-defunct "Thyssen Private Clinic" in Prien am Chiemsee in Bavaria. At the end of the 1970s, she concentrated her business activities on building a property. She also owned numerous properties.

=== Vienna Woods Affair ===
At the end of June 1986, Renate Thyssen acquired the then-struggling restaurant group "Wienerwald" from the Bayerische Landesbank, the Dresdner Bank, and two Swiss banks for 12 million Swiss francs instead of the originally estimated 40 million German marks. Thyssen acted as a front for the insolvent owner, Friedrich Jahn, as an option provided for a later takeover by Jahn. Jahn was a customer of both the freshness wipes produced by her first company and of the restaurant chain.

A political affair arose because Thyssen's financial advisor Dieter Krautzig represented the interests of both the Bayerische Landesbank and the Thyssen family in the collecting society. This was made worse as Thyssen at the time had an affair with Landesbank President Ludwig Huber. Jahn gave her his shares free of charge and was employed by "Wienerwald" in return. A few weeks later, Jahn bought the German Wienerwald restaurants for 2.5 million DM. After selling other loss-making subsidiaries in France, Sweden and Egypt, Thyssen concentrated on its core business in Austria with its 54 restaurants, 10 motorway service stations, 5 hotels and 1,500 employees. This clashed with an option for Jahn to purchase the profitable Austrian Wienerwald restaurants for 25 million DM plus taxes by 31 August 1987. Jahn wanted to exercise this option at the end of January 1987. A legal dispute began, culminating in public insults. Jahn was ultimately unable to raise the necessary funds for the option at the end of August.

The affair became public when it was revealed that bank president Huber had joined the supervisory board of "Wienerwald Austria" in June. The Bayerische Landesbank was not informed of this, and so Huber was forced to resign as president of the Bayerische Landesbank in 1988. Under the leadership of Renate Thyssen, "Wienerwald" rose to become the largest catering company in Austria. In 1988, the Austrian business magazine "Erfolg" named her Manager of the Year. At the end of the 1980s, she sold the company to the City of Vienna. Jahn was forced to sell the 230 German Wienerwald restaurants to the British spirits manufacturer Grand Metropolitan in 1988.

== Social engagement ==
In 2002, Renate Thyssen-Henne, along with her husband and daughter Gabriele, founded the Munich-based aid organization SOS Projects for People and Animals. The organization does not have the Deutsches Zentralinstitut für soziale Fragen (DZI) seal of approval.

== Private life ==
Renate Thyssen-Henne was married five times. After a first marriage, which lasted only three months, she married Helmut Homey, the son of an Essen entrepreneur, in 1962. With him she had two children: Gabriele Princess zu Leiningen and a son. In 1969 she married the German industrialist and physician Bodo Thyssen, a grandson of Joseph Thyssen, who adopted both children. She was married to her divorce lawyer Detlef Wunderlich, later the husband of the violinist Anne-Sophie Mutter, for seven years. Her fifth husband was the entrepreneur Ernst Theodor Henne, son of the racing driver Ernst Henne, with whom she was married until his death in 2018.
