= Hans Heinrich Thyssen-Bornemisza =

Dutch-born Swiss industrialist and art collector (1921–2002)

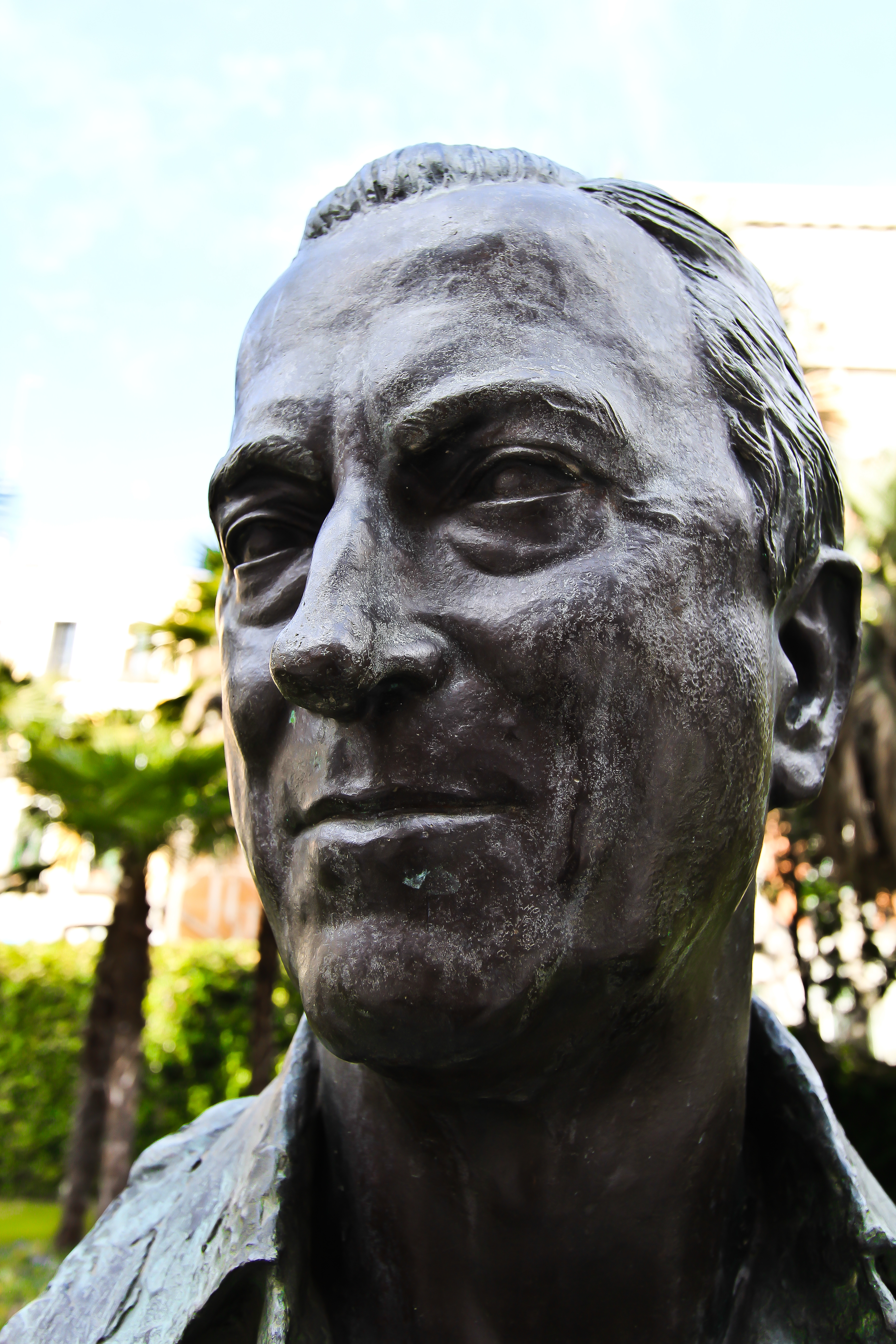
- Bust of Thyssen-Bornemisza at the Thyssen-Bornemisza Museum in Madrid, Spain
- Born: Hans Heinrich August Gábor Tasso Thyssen-Bornemisza de Kászon; 13 April 1921; Scheveningen, Netherlands
- Died: 27 April 2002 (aged 81); Sant Feliu de Guíxols, Spain
- Spouse(s): Princess Teresa of Lippe-Weissenfeld (m. 1946; div. 1954) Nina Dyer (m. 1954; div. 1956) Fiona Campbell-Walter (m. 1956; div. 1965) Denise Shorto (m. 1967; div. 1984) Carmen Cervera (m. 1985)
- Children: 4, including Francesca Thyssen-Bornemisza
- Parent(s): Heinrich, Baron Thyssen-Bornemisza de Kászon; Margit, Baroness Bornemisza de Kászon
- Relatives: August Thyssen (paternal grandfather)

Hans Heinrich August Gábor Tasso Thyssen-Bornemisza de Kászon, Baron Thyssen-Bornemisza (13 April 1921 – 27 April 2002), was a Dutch-born Swiss industrialist and art collector. A member of the Thyssen family, he had a Hungarian title and was heir to a German fortune.

He was born to a German father and a Hungarian mother. His paternal grandfather was August Thyssen.

Thyssen lived in Lugano for most of his adult life. His fifth and last wife, Carmen "Tita" Cervera, is a former Miss Spain.

== Early life ==
Thyssen-Bornemisza was born in Scheveningen, Netherlands, the son of Heinrich, Baron Thyssen-Bornemisza de Kászon de Impérfalva (Mülheim an der Ruhr, Germany, 1875–Lugano, Switzerland, 1947) and his first wife, Margaret (Margit), Baroness Bornemisza de Kászon (Csetény, Veszprém, Hungary, 1887–Locarno, Switzerland, 1971). The Thyssen family's fortune was built upon a steel empire. Heinrich Thyssen, after studying chemistry in Berlin, Bonn and Heidelberg, and living for some years in London, where he possibly sought to enter the diplomatic career, settled in Hungary in 1905. In Budapest, he married the daughter of the king's Hungarian chamberlain Gábor Bornemisza de Kászon et Impérfalva (Cluj-Napoca, Hungary (today Romania), 1859–Budapest, 1915) who, having no sons of his own, adopted Heinrich, the Emperor Franz Joseph I of Austria-Hungary extending his father-in-law's baronial title in the Hungarian nobility to Heinrich and his male-line descendants in 1907. Baroness Margit Bornemisza's mother was Mathilde Louise Price (Wilmington, Delaware, 1865–Locarno, 1959) and her paternal grandparents were the Baron Albert Bornemisza de Kászon (1832–1899) and the Countess Gabriella Kornis de Gönczruszka (1834–1902).

== Career ==
With his father's death in 1947, Thyssen-Bornemisza inherited TBG (Thyssen-Bornemisza Group) Holdings N.V., a business empire that included banking, naval construction (Bremer Vulkan) and large parts of Rotterdam harbor, as well as a major art collection with hundreds of paintings of European masters from between the 14th and the 19th centuries.

He bought more old masters, from Duccio to Francisco Goya; and fifteen years after his father's death, he bought his first piece of modern art, a watercolor painting by Emil Nolde dated from between 1931 and 1935, starting the entry of 20th century's paintings in the collection (including Pablo Picasso, Piet Mondrian, Edward Hopper, Jackson Pollock, Francis Bacon and Lucian Freud). His preference however went to German Expressionism, and he soon became a real expert in painting.

=== Assets dispute ===
As part of an attempt to dissolve a trust, thereby acquiring control of her third husband's assets, Tita cast doubt on the paternity of Baron Georg Heinrich Thyssen-Bornemisza, alleging that his father was actually Count Iván Batthyány de Német-Ujvár (1910–1985), the husband of Thyssen's sister, Countess Margit Batthyány (1911–1989). However, a settlement was reached between the parties before the baron's death, which brought to a "peaceable" conclusion the wrangling over control of the vast Thyssen art collection, which is to remain in Spain, his father Heinrich having been the founder of the Thyssen-Bornemisza Museum in Madrid.

One of the paintings in the museum, Rue Saint-Honoré in the Afternoon. Effect of Rain by Camille Pissarro, belonged to a Jewish couple who were forced to give it to the German government in exchange for an exit visa to the United Kingdom shortly after Kristallnacht in 1939. By 2015, their descendants had filed a lawsuit against the museum, on the grounds that it was stolen by the Nazis. Nevertheless, in 2019 the District Court of the State of California ruled that the law applicable to this case is Spanish law and, accordingly, the Thyssen-Bornemisza Collection Foundation in Madrid is the rightful owner of the painting, a ruling that was ratified by the Ninth Circuit court in January 2024.

On September 16, 2024, Governor Gavin Newsom signed a bill which “mandates that California law must apply in lawsuits involving the theft of art or other personal property looted during the Holocaust or due to other acts of political persecution”. On March 10, 2025, the U.S. Supreme Court filed an order vacating the 2024 judgment and returning the case to the Ninth Circuit Court.

== Personal life ==
He first married at Castagnola-Cassarate, 1 August 1946, Austrian Princess Teresa Amalia Franziska Elisabeth Maria of Lippe-Weissenfeld (21 July 1925 – 16 July 2008), daughter of Prince Alfred of Lippe-Weissenfeld (1896–1970) and Countess Franziska of Schönborn-Buchheim (1902–1987). She belonged to the cadet branch of House of Lippe who had been reigning princes until the fall of the German Empire in 1918 (following their divorce on 14 May 1954, she married secondly in 1960 Prince Friedrich Maximilian zu Fürstenberg (1926–1969), by whom she had further issue). Their only son was:

- Baron Georg Heinrich Thyssen-Bornemisza de Kászon (b. Lugano-Castagnola, 19 March 1950 - d. Zürich, 30 September 2022), chairman of TBG (Thyssen-Bornemisza Group) Holdings N.V., who has one son (born out of wedlock) by Countess Catharina Eleonore von Meran, former wife of Alexander Kahane and daughter of Count Maximilian von Meran (born 1930) and his wife, Princess Colienne zu Schwarzenberg (born 1937):
  - Simon Thyssen-Bornemisza de Kászon (b. Vienna, 1 December 2001)

=== Second marriage ===
Coat of arms of Hans Heinrich Thyssen-Bornemisza

His second marriage was in Colombo, Ceylon, or Paris, 23 June 1954, Anglo-Indian to fashion model Nina Sheila Dyer (1930–1965), an heiress to properties in Ceylon; they had no children and divorced on 4 July 1956, pursuant to the settlement of which she received a château in France. She later married and divorced Prince Sadruddin Aga Khan and committed suicide in 1965.

=== Third marriage ===
He married for the third time at Lugano-Castagnola on 17 September 1956 New Zealand-born British photographic and fashion model Fiona Frances Elaine Campbell-Walter (b. Takapuna, New Zealand, 25 June 1932). They divorced on 20 January 1965, and she went on to have a well-publicized relationship with Greek shipping heir Alexander Onassis, the only son of Aristotle Onassis. She was a daughter of Rear Admiral Keith McNeil Walter (later Campbell-Walter) (1904–1976), aide de camp of King George VI and his wife, Frances Henriette Campbell (born in 1904), a maternal granddaughter of Sir Edward Campbell, 1st Baronet. Their children were:

- Baroness Francesca Thyssen-Bornemisza (born Lausanne, 7 June 1958), married at Mariazell, 31 January 1993 to Karl Habsburg-Lothringen (divorced in 2017), heir to the defunct Austro-Hungarian imperial throne, and had issue.
- Baron Lorne Thyssen-Bornemisza de Kászon (born 15 June 1963), who converted to Islam; he is the producer and director of the 2003 film, "Labyrinth" and executive produced "The Garden of Eden" in 2008. He is the Chairman of Thyssen Petroleum and founder of the Kallos Gallery in London. He married in 2005 Alexandra Wright; they have one daughter.

=== Fourth marriage ===
He married for the fourth time at Lugano-Castagnola, 13 December 1967, Lilian Denise Shorto (b. Recife, 23 December 1942), a Brazilian banker's daughter, from whom he was divorced 29 November 1984. They had one son:

- Baron Wilfrid "Alexander" August Thyssen-Bornemisza de Kászon (born Zurich 1974), unmarried and without issue.

=== Fifth marriage ===
His fifth and final marriage was in Daylesford, Gloucestershire, on 16 August 1985, María del Carmen Rosario Soledad Cervera y Fernández de la Guerra, popularly known as Carmen "Tita" Cervera, (born Sitges, Barcelona, 23 April 1943), who was Miss Spain in 1961. They had no children, but Hans Heinrich adopted her son, Alejandro Borja (born Madrid, 1980, son of Manuel Segura), who married at Barcelona, 11 October 2007 Blanca María Cuesta Unkhoff and had two children: Sacha Thyssen-Bornemisza de Kászon on 31 January 2008 and Eric Thyssen-Bornemisza de Kászon on 5 August 2010. His widow has also adopted two baby girls, twins, called Guadalupe Sabina and María del Carmen in July 2006.

=== Death ===
Hans Henrich died in Sant Feliu de Guíxols, Spain. He is buried in the family burial vault of Schloss Landsberg in the Ruhr valley near Essen, Germany.

== Ancestry ==
Ancestors of Hans Heinrich Thyssen-Bornemisza

8. Johann Friedrich Thyssen
4. August Thyssen
9. Katharina Thyssen
2. Heinrich Thyssen
10. Johann-Heinrich Pelzer
5. Hedwig Pelzer
11. Hedwig Troost
1. Hans Henrik (Hans Heinrich "Heini") Ágost Gábor Tasso, Baron Thyssen-Bornemisza de Kászon
12. Baron Albert Bornemisza de Kászon et Impérfalvá
6. Baron Gábor Bornemisza de Kászon et Impérfalvá
13. Countess Gabrielle Kornis de Göncz-Ruszka
3. Baroness Margit Bornemisza de Kászon et Impérfalvá
14. James Price
7. Mathilde Louise Price
15. Sarah M. Harlan

== See also ==
- Thyssen family
- Thyssen-Bornemisza Museum - museum link
- Exame - Negócios em Revista, April, 1989, Ano 1, N.º 1
