= Diesel =

Diesel may refer to:

- Diesel engine, an internal combustion engine where ignition is caused by compression
- Diesel fuel, a liquid fuel used in diesel engines
- Diesel locomotive, a railway locomotive in which the prime mover is a diesel engine

== Arts and entertainment ==
- Diesel (band), a Dutch pop/rock group
- Diesel (1942 film), a German film about Rudolf Diesel
- Diesel (game engine), a computer gaming technology
- Diesel, a former name of Brazilian rock band Udora
- Diesel (2025 film), an Indian action thriller film

== People ==
=== Surname ===
- Nathanael Diesel (1692–1745), Danish composer, violinist and lutenist
- Rudolf Diesel (1858–1913), German inventor and mechanical engineer
- Vin Diesel (Mark Sinclair, born 1967), American actor, producer and director

=== Nickname or ring name ===
- Diesel (musician) (Mark Lizotte, born 1966), American-Australian rock singer-songwriter
- Zach Banner (born 1993), once known as The Diesel, American football player
- Diesel Dahl (born 1959), drummer of TNT
- Fazal-ur-Rehman (politician, born 1953) famously known as Diesel or Maulana Diesel
- Noah Davis (baseball) (nicknamed Diesel; born 1997), American baseball player
- Kane (wrestler) (Glenn Jacobs, born 1967), American wrestler, former ring name fake "Diesel", imitating Kevin Nash's gimmick
- David S. LaForce or Diesel, American artist
- Kevin Nash (born 1959) ring name and gimmick for American professional wrestler Kevin Nash while performing in the WWF/E
- Shaquille O'Neal (born 1972), American basketball player, now music producer and DJ known as DIESEL
- John Riggins (born 1949), or The Diesel, American football player
- Joe Riggs (born 1982), or Diesel, American mixed martial artist
- Greg Williams (Australian footballer), or Diesel, Australian-rules footballer

== Other uses ==
- Diesel (brand), an Italian clothing company
- Diesel (dog), a French police dog killed in 2015
- Diesel (donkey), a wild donkey in California
- 10093 Diesel, an asteroid named after Rudolf Diesel
- Operation Diesel, a 2009 British military operation in Afghanistan
- Diesel, brand of A. J. Fernandez Cigars
- Diesel, a variety of Snakebite (drink)

== See also ==
- Dießl, or Diessl, a surname
