= Bornemisza =

Coat of arms of Baron Hans Heinrich von Thyssen-Bornemisza de Kászon et Impérfalva

The Bornemisza family or Bornemisza de Kászon et Impérfalva is a Hungarian noble family which dates back to the first half of the 17th century. They were ennobled on 19 March 1633 by George I Rákóczi and received the hereditary title of Baron in 1717. Since then, members of this family occupied many important political positions in the Principality of Transylvania. At one point, they served as Vice-Chancellors of Transylvania.

== Thyssen-Bornemisza ==
In 1905 Heinrich Thyssen, member of the Thyssen family from Aachen, married Baroness Margit Bornemisza de Kászon et Impérfalva (1887–1971), the daughter of the king's Hungarian chamberlain Baron Gábor Bornemisza de Kászon et Impérfalva (1859–1915). Gabor, being the last male of his line and having no sons of his own, adopted Heinrich, his son in law. As a result of the adoption, the Emperor Franz Joseph I of Austria-Hungary officially extended his father-in-law's baronial title in the Hungarian nobility to Heinrich and his legitimate male-line descendants on 22 June 1907 in Vienna. Since then, their legitimate male line offspring are entitled to the name Baron von Thyssen-Bornemisza de Kászon et Impérfalva.

== Notable members ==
- Hans Heinrich Thyssen-Bornemisza
- Fiona Thyssen-Bornemisza
- Heinrich, Baron Thyssen-Bornemisza de Kászon
- Péter Bornemisza
- Anna Bornemisza
- George Bornemissza
- Francesca Anne Dolores Freiin Thyssen-Bornemisza de Kászon et Impérfalva
- Gergely Bornemissza
- Gyula Bornemisza

== See also ==
- List of titled noble families in the Kingdom of Hungary
