= Fritz Thyssen Foundation =

German charitable foundation

Coordinates: 51°54′30″N 8°25′09″E

The Fritz Thyssen Foundation (German: Fritz Thyssen Stiftung) is a private nonprofit foundation in Germany, created on 7 July 1959 by Amélie Thyssen and Anita Gräfin Zichy-Thyssen and named in memory of prominent iron and steel manufacturer August Thyssen and his son Fritz, who became a major financial backer of the ascendant Nazi Party in the early 1930s.

The Thyssen family generated significant wealth in the late 19th century as producers of coal, iron and steel. August Thyssen founded Thyssen & Co. KG in Mülheim in 1871 and, over the following decades, established iron- and steelmaking plants throughout the Ruhr region of Germany. Following August's death in 1926, Fritz Thyssen assumed control of the iron and steel empire. In 1932, Thyssen signed a petition urging German President Paul von Hindenburg to appoint Adolf Hitler to the German chancellorship. The following year, he orchestrated a meeting between Hitler and influential German industrialists, which significantly increased support for the Third Reich among leaders of major companies. Thyssen officially joined the Nazi Party in 1933. Following World War II, a German denazification court found him guilty of being a "minor Nazi offender" and ordered him to surrender a portion of his property to a compensation program for victims of Nazi persecution.

Thyssen's wife Amélie, also a member of the Nazi Party, inherited control of the iron and steel business following her husband's death in 1951. She used proceeds from the sale of shares in August Thyssen-Hütte AG to create the Fritz Thyssen Foundation, for which she was awarded the second highest Order of Merit in the Federal Republic of Germany.

Today, the Fritz Thyssen Foundation supports research in the fields of history, language and culture, state, economics, society and medicine, devoting special attention to support for junior researchers. The award of grants to doctoral graduates and the funding of staff positions in projects is intended to advance scientific research. The foundation is based in Cologne.
