= Georg Heinrich Thyssen-Bornemisza =

Swiss venture capitalist (1950–2022)

Georg Heinrich, Baron Thyssen-Bornemisza
- Born: 19 March 1950; Lugano, Switzerland
- Died: 30 September 2022; Zürich, Switzerland
- Partner: Catharina Eleonore Meran-Brandhofen
- Parents: Hans Heinrich Thyssen-Bornemisza (father); Princess Maria Theresa Amalia of Lippe-Weissenfeld (mother)
- Family: Thyssen-Bornemisza

Georg Heinrich, Baron Thyssen-Bornemisza (19 March 1950 – 30 September 2022) was the chairman of the private venture capital firm TBG AG, which operates as the investment arm of the Thyssen-Bornemisza family.

== Early life ==
Georg Heinrich was the eldest son of noted industrialist and art collector Hans Heinrich Thyssen-Bornemisza (1921–2002) from his first wife, Princess Teresa Amalia Franziska Elisabeth Maria of Lippe-Weissenfeld (1925–2008), second child and the only daughter of Prince Alfred of Lippe-Weissenfeld (1896–1970) and Franziska, Countess of Schönborn-Buchheim (1902–1987).

== Career ==
Under his chairmanship, TBG has undertaken several large acquisitions, including the $900M purchase in 2017 of US-based weather and data analytics company DTN, and the 2018 purchase of European weather firm MeteoGroup for an undisclosed sum. He was among the wealthiest individuals in Switzerland. He had been chairman of the Zürich-based NOMIS Foundation since its founding in 2008.

== Personal life ==
He never married but he had a son with Catherina Eleonore, Countess of Meran (of a branch of the House of Habsburg-Lorraine).
