= Inaara Aga Khan =

German philanthropist (born 1963)

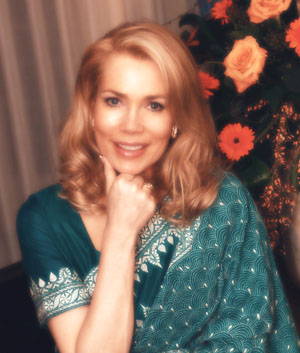
- Inaara Aga Khan in 2006
- Title: Begum Aga Khan

Personal life
- Born: Gabriele Renate Homey; 1 April 1963 (age 63) Frankfurt am Main, West Germany
- Spouse: Prince Karl Emich of Leiningen (m. 1991; div. 1998) Aga Khan IV (m. 1998; div. 2011) Wolfgang Porsche (m. 2025)
- Children: Princess Theresa of Leiningen; Aly Muhammad Aga Khan
- Parents: Helmut Friedhelm Homey (father); Renate Thyssen-Henne (mother)

Religious life
- Religion: Nizari Ismaili Shia Islam
- Profession: Model; Begum of Nizari Ismaili; Philanthropist

Inaara Aga Khan (born Gabriele Renate Homey; formerly Thyssen; 1 April 1963) is a German philanthropist. She was the second wife of Karim al-Husseini (Aga Khan IV), who served as the 49th Imam of the Nizari branch of the Shia Imami Ismaili Muslims; from May 1998 to March 2014, she held the title Begum Aga Khan.

== Early life ==
Inaara Aga Khan, born as Gabriele Renate Homey, is the daughter of a family of German entrepreneurs, Renate Thyssen-Henne (née Kerkhoff) and Helmut Friedhelm Homey. Early in life, she adopted the surname "Thyssen" from her stepfather Bodo Thyssen (a member of the Thyssen family).

After attending the Schloss Salem School on Lake Constance and the École des Roches (fr) in Normandy, France, she studied jurisprudence at the Universities of Munich and Cologne. In 1990, Inaara graduated magna cum laude with a doctorate in international law after completing her thesis on German-American commercial law. Her early career included working, whilst still at university, in the management of her mother's company (at the time Austria's largest hotel and restaurant chain) and later as an associate attorney for a German law firm.

== Marriages and children ==
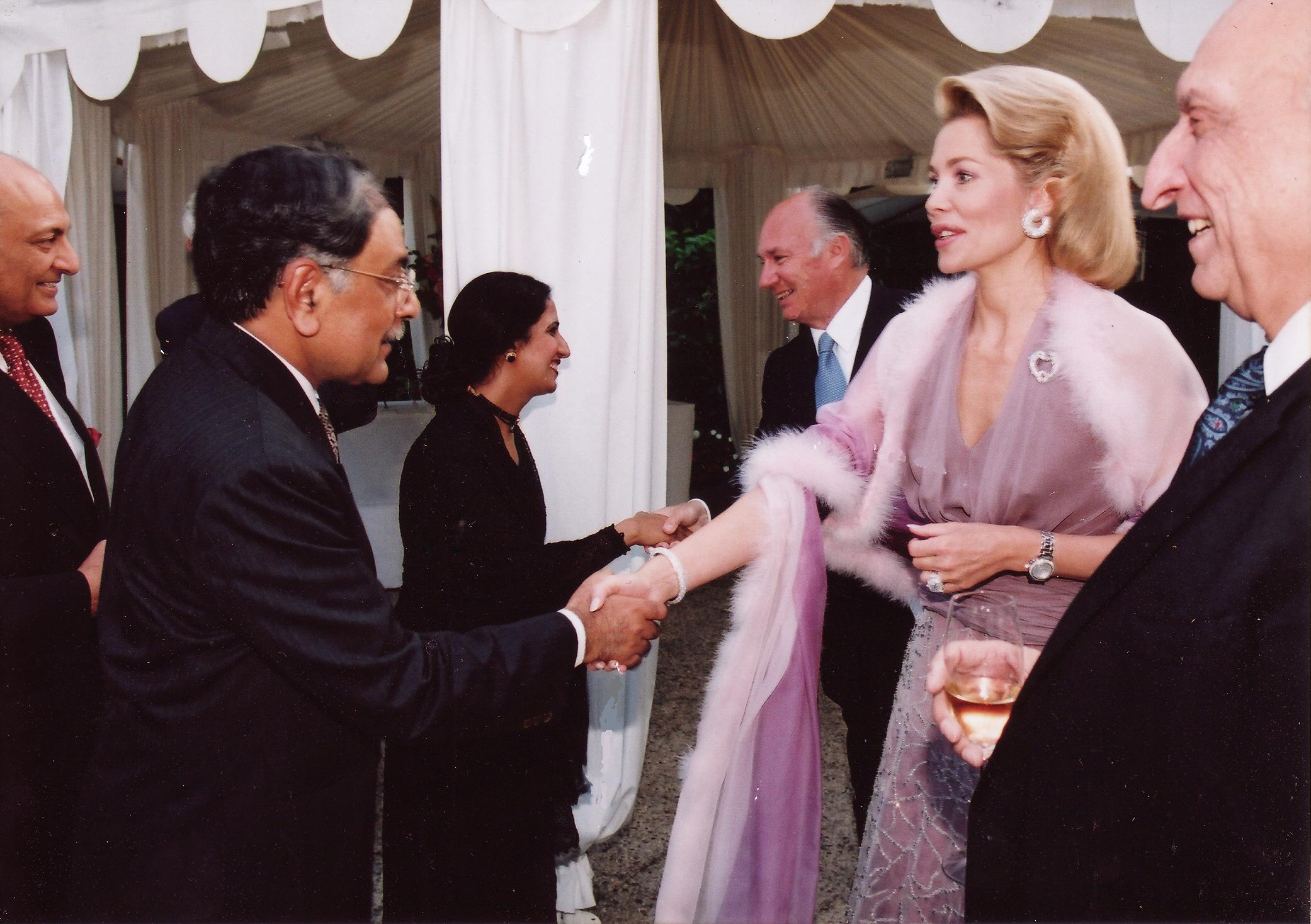
From (L) to (R) Musa Javed Chohan, Naela Chohan, Karim al-Husseini, Inaara Aga Khan, and Sahibzada Yaqub Khan in Paris (2002).

In 1991 she married Prince Karl Emich of Leiningen in Venice, Italy. She has one child with Prince Karl Emich, a daughter:

- Princess Theresa of Leiningen (born 26 April 1992)

After interrupting her career prior to the birth of her daughter, Inaara became a consultant for UNESCO in Paris, advising on the promotion of equality and improved conditions for women. The marriage between Prince Karl Emich of Leiningen and Gabriele Thyssen was dissolved early in 1998.

In May 1998, she married Karim Aga Khan, Aga Khan IV, the 49th hereditary Imam of the Nizari branch of the Shia Imami Ismaili Muslims and became the Begum Aga Khan. Prior to her marriage to Karim and her conversion to Islam, the couple jointly chose the Muslim name "Inaara" for the bride. The marriage took place at the Aga Khan's walled compound and chateau, Aiglemont, in Gouvieux, France, on May 30, 1998. She has a son, Aly Muhammad Aga Khan (born March 7, 2000).

However, a little over six years after the marriage, on October 8, 2004, Karim and Inaara stated they would seek a divorce. In September 2011, a divorce settlement was reached and Inaara was to receive a settlement amount of £50 million. However, the £50 million settlement was contested by Karim in France's highest court, shortly after being announced. As a result, divorce proceedings continued while Karim was said to remain legally married to his second wife. The divorce was finalized in March 2014 with the final financial settlement not revealed.

In April 2016, it was announced that part of Inaara's jewellery collection was to be auctioned by Christie's.

In 2025, Inaara married Wolfgang Porsche, son of Ferry Porsche, and the grandson of automotive pioneer Ferdinand Porsche. He is a shareholder and chairman of the Supervisory Board of Porsche Automobil Holding SE as well as of Porsche AG. The Porsche family is the 7th richest family of Germany (2022) with an estimated net worth of 66.5 billion euros.

== Charitable activities ==
Since 1999, Inaara has been supporting micro-loans and third world development projects through the German foundation Hilfe zur Selbsthilfe. The foundation funds micro-loans to families and single parents to promote self-reliance and to end the cycle of poverty in developing countries, which include Cambodia, Kazakhstan, Mongolia, Montenegro, Pakistan, Romania, Thailand and Vietnam.

Inaara has committed time to charitable causes; in particular those involving women's rights, educational projects and the improvement of opportunities and living conditions for people of all faiths and origins in developing countries. In January 2002, Inaara became the honorary president of Focus Humanitarian Assistance, the crisis response agency that is an affiliate of the Aga Khan Development Network (AKDN) and which provides relief and support services during and following natural and man-made disasters, primarily in Asia and Africa. In this capacity, Inaara supported several projects for the repatriation of Afghan refugees to their homeland and for rebuilding civil society in Afghanistan.

In addition, she continued to contribute to numerous UNESCO projects, particularly in the area of welfare for women and children, for example, UNESCO's "Passport for Equality" project. Amongst others, she accepted the patronage of the Innocence in Danger Gala event for 2003 in Berlin to help victims of child sexual abuse.

Together with her mother and stepfather, Ernst-Theodor Henne, Inaara founded in 2003 the German aid organization "SOS Projects for People and Animals" to help mentally ill, handicapped and traumatized children with the support of animals, particularly dogs, to bring fun and joy into the children's lives, and to overcome their pain and suffering.

Since 2004, Inaara supports the German AIDS Foundation.

Inaara founded an umbrella organization, The "Princess Inaara Foundation", in 2004. The purpose of the foundation is to provide philanthropic assistance to the causes and charitable organizations whose work represents the humanitarian goals that Inaara has long supported.

In 2009, Inaara became an ambassador for FIFA Football for Hope to promote a high-quality, sustainable social and humanitarian development programme, centred on football, which focuses on the fields of health promotion, peacebuilding, children's rights and education, anti-discrimination, social integration and the environment.

== Awards and recognition ==
In September 2006, Inaara was awarded the "Reminders Day" award for her commitment, dedication. and relentless effort in the fight against HIV and AIDS. The award was presented to her at Berlin's red-brick City Hall by Mayor Klaus Wowereit during the "Reminders Day" ceremony.

In January 2007, she was named the "No.1" person of German Society by the German magazine "Gala", which wrote "Whereas other women, following separation from their influential husbands, often disappear from society without a trace, Her Highness has catapulted from last year's 19th position to first position. She has maintained her commitment to charitable work and stylish appearance and not said a single unkind word about her husband, the Aga Khan."

== See also ==
- Alumni of Schule Schloss Salem
