= Aly Muhammad Aga Khan =

British cinematographer; fourth child of Aga Khan IV (born 2000)

Prince Aly Muhammad Aga Khan
- Born: Aly Muhammad Aga Khan; 7 March 2000 (age 26); Paris, France
- Father: Karim al-Husseini
- Mother: Begum Inaara Aga Khan
- Religion: Nizari Isma'ili Shia Islam

Prince Aly Muhammad Aga Khan (Arabic: علي محمد آغا خان; born 7 March 2000) is the only child of Karim al-Husseini (Aga Khan IV) by his second wife, Gabriele Renate Homey. and the younger brother of Rahim al-Hussaini, Aga Khan V.

== Early life and education ==
Aly Muhammad Aga Khan was born on 7 March 2000, in Paris, France. His father was the leader of the Nizari Ismailis, Karim al-Husseini. His mother, Gabriele Renate Homey, a member of the Thyssen family, is a German lawyer. His paternal grandmother was Joan Yarde-Buller, daughter of John Yarde-Buller, 3rd Baron Churston. From his father's first marriage to Salimah Aga Khan, Aly has three older half-siblings; Zahra Aga Khan, Rahim al-Hussaini Aga Khan, and Hussain Aga Khan. From his mother's first marriage to Prince Karl Emich of Leiningen, he has an older half-sister, Theresa. In 2025, his mother married Wolfgang Porsche, a shareholder and chairman of the Supervisory Board of Porsche Automobil Holding SE as well as of Porsche AG, and a member of the Porsche family, the 7th richest family in Germany.

Much of Aly's childhood was spent in Europe, where he completed secondary education. He graduated from Harvard University in 2024.

== Career ==
He directed the 2018 short film "Close To Home," shot in Gilgit-Baltistan, part of the conflict-torn state of Kashmir, subject to a United Nations Security Council dispute, and freedom struggle. The movie which documents the plight of a poverty stricken community plagued by natural disasters, was screened at Jubilee Arts International Film Festival in Lisbon, Portugal.

In 2020, Aly released the feature-length documentary "Al-Khimyah," which explores the work of the Aga Khan Historic Cities Programme in Cairo. The documentary addresses the 30-hectare Al-Azhar Park—converted from a mound of rubble—and the stories of local residents of the adjacent al-Darb al-Ahmar neighbourhood.

Aly Muhammad is an active member of Aga Khan Foundation, an agency of the Aga Khan Development Network.

In 2026, Aly Muhammad joined the Board of Directors of the Aga Khan Museum, building on his work with the Aga Khan Foundation, and the Aga Khan Music Programme.
