= Nina Dyer =

British model and socialite (1930–1965)

Nina Sheila Dyer
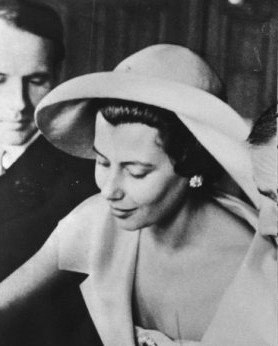
- Born: 15 February 1930; British Ceylon
- Died: 3 July 1965 (aged 35); Paris, France
- Cause of death: suicide
- Other names: Baroness Nina Thyssen-Bornemisza; Princess Nina Aga Khan; Shirin
- Occupations: model and socialite
- Spouses: Hans Heinrich Thyssen-Bornemisza (m. 1954; div. 1956) Prince Sadruddin Aga Khan (m. 1957; div. 1962)

Nina Sheila Dyer (15 February 1930 – 3 July 1965) was an Anglo-Indian model and socialite. Through her marriages, she became a wealthy baroness, then a princess.

== Early life ==
Dyer was born on 15 February 1930 in British Ceylon (now known as Sri Lanka). Her father was British tea plantation owner, Stanley Dyer, and her mother was Indian, making Dyer Anglo-Indian. She grew up on the tea plantation in Ceylon.

== Career ==
After moving to England when she was 20, Dyer took acting classes in Liverpool, then began a career in London as a swimwear model.

English fashion houses considered that her high cheekbones and full lips looked "overly exotic" for British tastes, so Dyer moved to Paris. She found more success in France and became a favourite fashion model of French couturier Pierre Balmain. Dyer also became a socialite, mingled in international high society circles and attended glamorous parties on the French Riviera.

== Marriages ==
=== First marriage ===
On 23 June 1954, in Colombo, Ceylon, Dyer married wealthy industrialist and art collector Baron Hans Heinrich Thyssen-Bornemisza, known as "Heini", as his second wife. After the marriage, she was styled as baroness. They had allegedly begun an affair whilst he was still married to his first wife, Princess Teresa of Lippe-Weissenfeld. Before their marriage, Thyssen-Bornemisza gave Dyer cars, jewels, one of four wild chinchilla fur coats in the world and two pet black panthers. One Valentine’s Day, he gave her Pellew Island in Jamaica as a gift. The couple had no children.

After Thyssen-Bornemisza discovered the Dyer was having an affair with French actor Christian Marquand, he divorced her on 4 July 1956 in Lugano, Switzerland. They were married for ten months and she received $2.8m, $400,000 of jewels, a painting by El Greco and Thyssen-Bornemisza's château in France from the divorce settlement. Shortly after the divorce, in 1956 Thyssen-Bornemisza remarried to another British fashion model, Fiona Campbell-Walter.

=== Second marriage ===
On 27 August 1957, in the Khan family mansion in Collonges-Bellerive, near Geneva, Switzerland, Dyer married Prince Sadruddin Aga Khan. He was the son of Sir Sultan Aga Khan III, 48th Imam of the Nizari Isma'ili, and Princess Andrée Joséphine Carron. Dyer converted to Shia Islam, was styled as princess and took the name Shirin, meaning sweetness.

Prince Aga Khan gave up his place in the succession in order to marry Dyer, as she had previously been married. He gifted her with luxury cars, jewels and Jamaican Tiamo Island, which neighboured Pellew Island that she had received from her first husband. Dyer was accused of being a gold digger and responded that:

"People have called me scheming, but nothing is further from the truth. Luck fell on me without doing anything, it has been like this since my childhood. It just happened that the great things in life became my daily life."

The couple had no children and divorced in 1962 after five years of marriage. She received $1.4m from the divorce settlement.

=== Sexuality ===
American writer and journalist Dominic Dunne claimed that Dyer was "indifferent to gender when it came to love partners." She allegedly had numerous affairs, and Nicolás Franco flirted with her after her divorces.

== Death ==
Dyer suffered from depression. She died by suicide at her chateau in France after taking an overdose of sleeping pills on 3 July 1965. Her will stipulated that proceeds from the sale of her jewels and cars after her death would be left to animal welfare charities.
