= Amélie Thyssen =

German businesswoman and wife of Fritz Thyssen

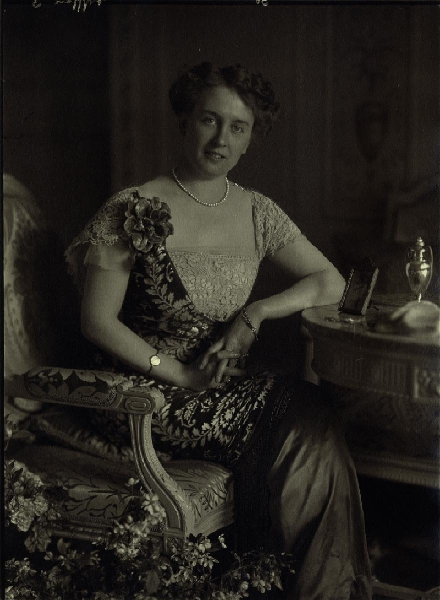
- Amélie Thyssen by Jacob Hilsdorf (around 1910).
- Born: 11 September 1877; Mülheim, Germany
- Died: 25 August 1965 (aged 87); Straubing, Germany
- Occupation: Businesswoman
- Spouse: Fritz Thyssen
- Children: Anita

Amélie Thyssen (11 September 1877 – 25 August 1965) was a German businesswoman and wife of Fritz Thyssen.

During World War II she had voluntarily joined her husband at the Dachau concentration camp and later was held at Buchenwald as well.

Amélie Thyssen died in 1965. Anita Countess Zichy-Thyssen ran the Foundation until her death in 1990. The family has had a dispute over the running of the Foundation.

She created on 7 July 1959 the Fritz Thyssen Foundation with Anita Gräfin Zichy-Thyssen.

== Distinction ==
- Order of Merit of the Federal Republic of Germany

== See also ==
- Transport of concentration camp inmates to Tyrol
