= Kallos Gallery =

Antiquities dealer in London, England

Coordinates: 51.51125°N 0.14748°W

Kallos Gallery is an antiquities dealer located in Mayfair, London, specialising in Greek Antiquities.

== Background ==
Kallos Gallery was founded by Baron Lorne Thyssen-Bornemisza in 2014. He has an interest in Classical Greek antiquities and funds several institutional archaeological excavations, and has endowed courses and research positions at Wolfson College, University of Oxford and the Open University, and numerous scholarships through the Cogito Scholarship Foundation to broaden access to education about the classical world.

== Fairs and exhibitions ==
Kallos Gallery participates in a number of international fairs, such as the Frieze Art Fair London, the London Art Fair and their own specialist exhibitions such as Horses, Rulers, and Victory.
