= Thyssen AG =

German steel producer

Thyssen Aktiengesellschaft
- Company type: Private
- Industry: Steel
- Founded: 1891; 135 years ago in Hamborn, Prussia, Rhine Province, Germany
- Founders: August & Joseph Thyssen
- Defunct: 1999; 27 years ago
- Fate: Merged with Krupp to form ThyssenKrupp
- Headquarters: Essen, Germany

Thyssen was a major German steel producer founded by August Thyssen. The company merged with Friedrich Krupp AG Hoesch-Krupp in 1999 to form ThyssenKrupp.

== History ==
On 29 September 1891, August Thyssen and his brother Joseph Thyssen came to be in possession of all shares of Gewerkschaft Deutscher Kaiser, a coal mining company. On 17 December 1891, the steelworks of the same company opened in Hamborn (today part of Duisburg).

Subsequently, the plant was modernized and expanded by August Thyssen, becoming a vertically integrated company producing iron and steel and manufacturing ships, machines etc.

After the First World War came the occupation of the Ruhr and the loss of many foreign interests; however the company remained viable.

On 4 April 1926, August Thyssen died; his son, Fritz Thyssen became chairman of a new group Vereinigte Stahlwerke AG (United Steelworks) which was formed by a consortium of companies, with Thyssen representing 26% of the company's value. In 1934, August Thyssen-Hütte AG was founded as part of the new group.

The Nazi rearmament policy and subsequent war made the plants essential to the war economy. After the end of World War II, the Allies ordered the company to be liquidated and in 1953 a new company, also named August Thyssen-Hütte AG, was formed in Duisburg. The other mills of the company in Duisburg became legally independent entities; in the 1950s and 1960s they were reintegrated into the Thyssen group. However, the mining division was not reconglomerated; thus Thyssen became largely a steel company.

In 1954/55, the group focused on acquisitions to restore the vertical integration by acquiring mining concerns.

Further companies were acquired: Niederrheinischen Hütte AG in 1956, Deutschen Edelstahlwerke AG in 1957, Phoenix-Rheinrohr AG (metallurgical works and mills), and Hüttenwerk Oberhausen AG in 1968. The product range included steel sections and flat steel in all grades, including high-alloy steel. By the mid 1960s, August Thyssen-Hütte AG was Europe's largest crude steel producer, and the fifth largest in the world.

In the 1960s, the company also formed cooperative alliances with companies such as Mannesmann AG. By 1972, it employed 92,200 people and generated annual sales of 9.8 billion DM.

In 1973, the company acquired Rheinstahl AG, which was mainly a manufacturing company. This takeover reduced the company's dominance in the steel industry and converted it to a conglomerate. In 1977, the company became Thyssen AG, with Rheinstahl AG already having been renamed Thyssen Industrie AG in 1976.

In 1983, Thyssen Stahl AG was spun off. During the 1980s, talks on a merger between Thyssen Stahl AG and Krupp Stahl AG took place. An alliance did not take place at that time, but there began cooperation on certain business areas (tinplate, electrical steel, and stainless steel).

In 1997, the flat steel production divisions of both groups were merged to form Thyssen Krupp Stahl AG.

On 17 March 1999, a new group formed by the merger of Thyssen and Krupp was registered, and on 23 October the merger took place, forming ThyssenKrupp (TK). That same year, they acquired the elevator division of American-based conglomerate Dover Corporation.

It was revealed in February 2021 when Liberty Steel Group proposed to take over from TK the Thyssen plant in Duisburg, that it can produce 13 million metric tons per year of crude steel, from four blast furnaces and two redox furnaces. "The plant casts slab for rolling into hot and cold rolled coil, as well as plate." TK lost €960 million in 2020 and had sought to offload this asset, which it values at €1.5 billion. The discussions failed because Liberty wanted TK to pay money for the privilege of losing the Duisburg plant from its balance sheet.

== Gallery ==
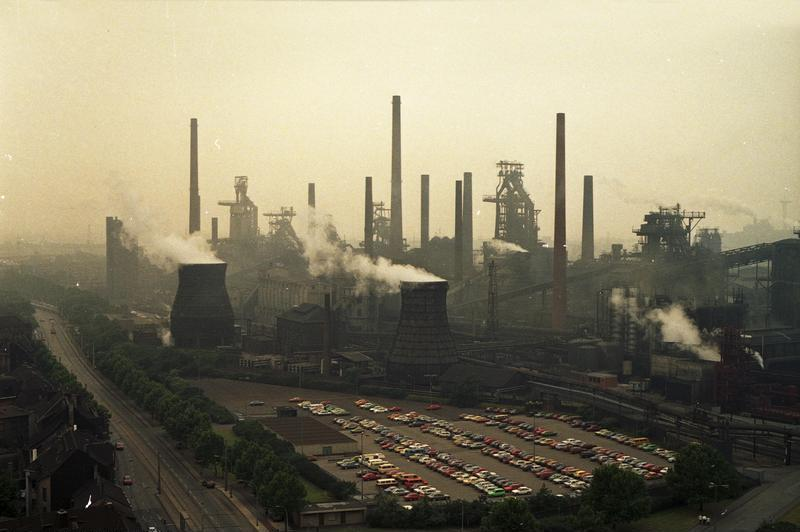
Thyssen steelworks in Duisburg (1988)

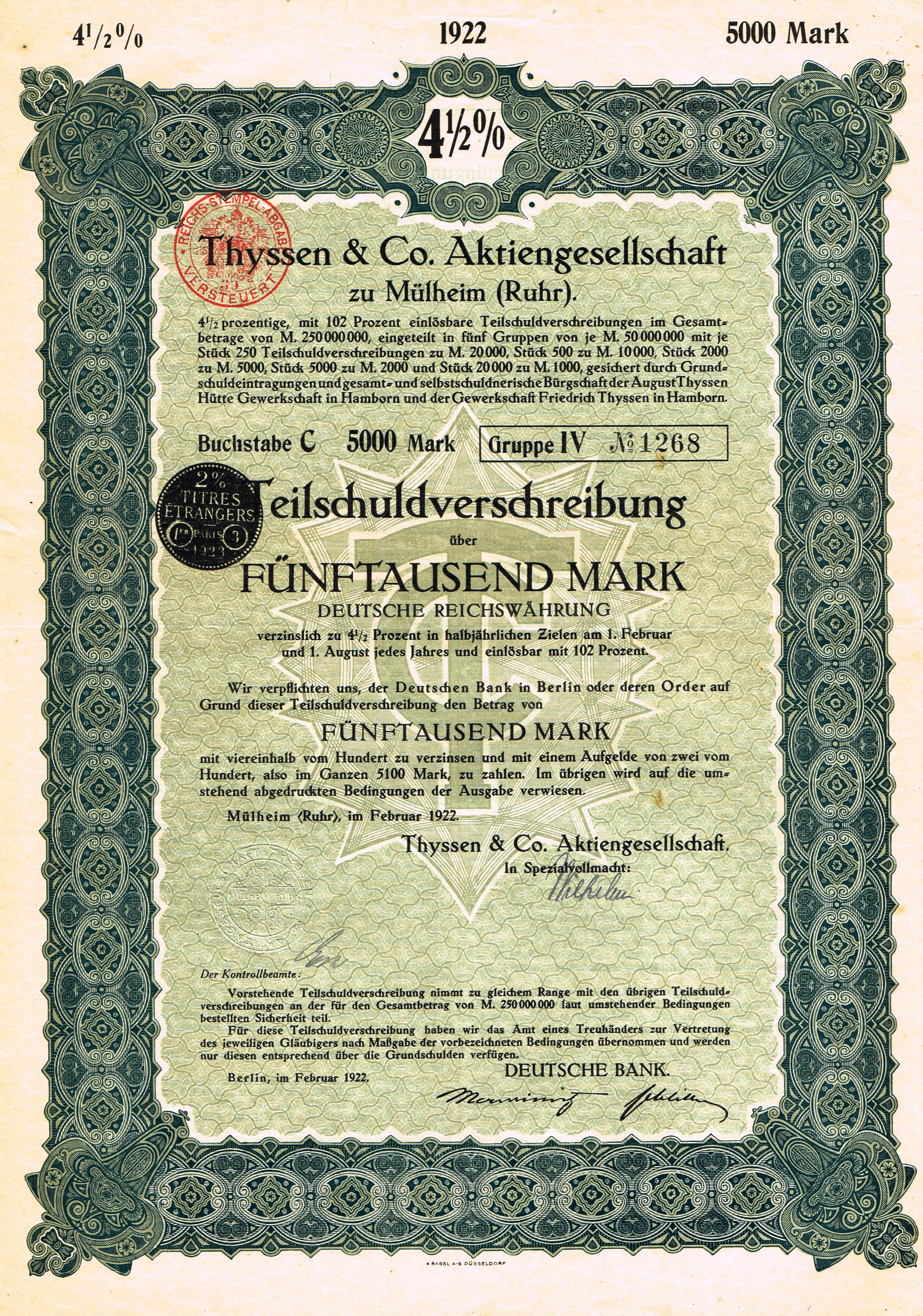
Bond of the Thyssen & Co. AG, issued February 1922

== Sources ==
- "History – thyssenkrupp AG". www.thyssen.com.
- Helmut Uebbing (1991). Wege und Wegmarken. 100 Jahre Thyssen (in German). Siedler Verlag, Berlin. ISBN 3-88680-417-8.
- Wilhelm Treue (1966). Die Feuer verlöschen nie - August Thyssen-Hütte 1890-1926 (in German). Econ-Verlag Düsseldorf und Wien.
