= Sadruddin Aga Khan =

UN High Commissioner for Refugees (1933–2003)

Prince Sadruddin Aga Khan
- صدر الدین آغا خان
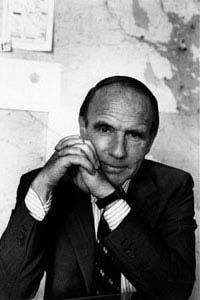
- Sadruddin Aga Khan in 1991
- Born: 17 January 1933; Neuilly-sur-Seine, France
- Died: 12 May 2003 (aged 70); Boston, Massachusetts, United States
- Education: Harvard University
- Spouses: Nina Dyer (m. 1957–1962) Catherine Aleya Sursock (m. 1972–2003)
- Parent(s): Sultan Muhammad Shah (father); Andrée Joséphine Carron (mother)
- Family: Aly Khan (brother); Karim al-Husseini (nephew); Amyn Aga Khan (nephew); Yasmin Aga Khan (niece)

Prince Sadruddin Aga Khan (17 January 1933 – 12 May 2003) was a French-born statesman and activist who served as United Nations High Commissioner for Refugees from 1966 to 1977. During his tenure, the agency expanded its operational focus to include refugee situations outside Europe.

He married twice, but had no children of his own. Sadruddin died of cancer at the age of 70, and was buried in Switzerland.

== Life and career ==
=== Childhood and education ===
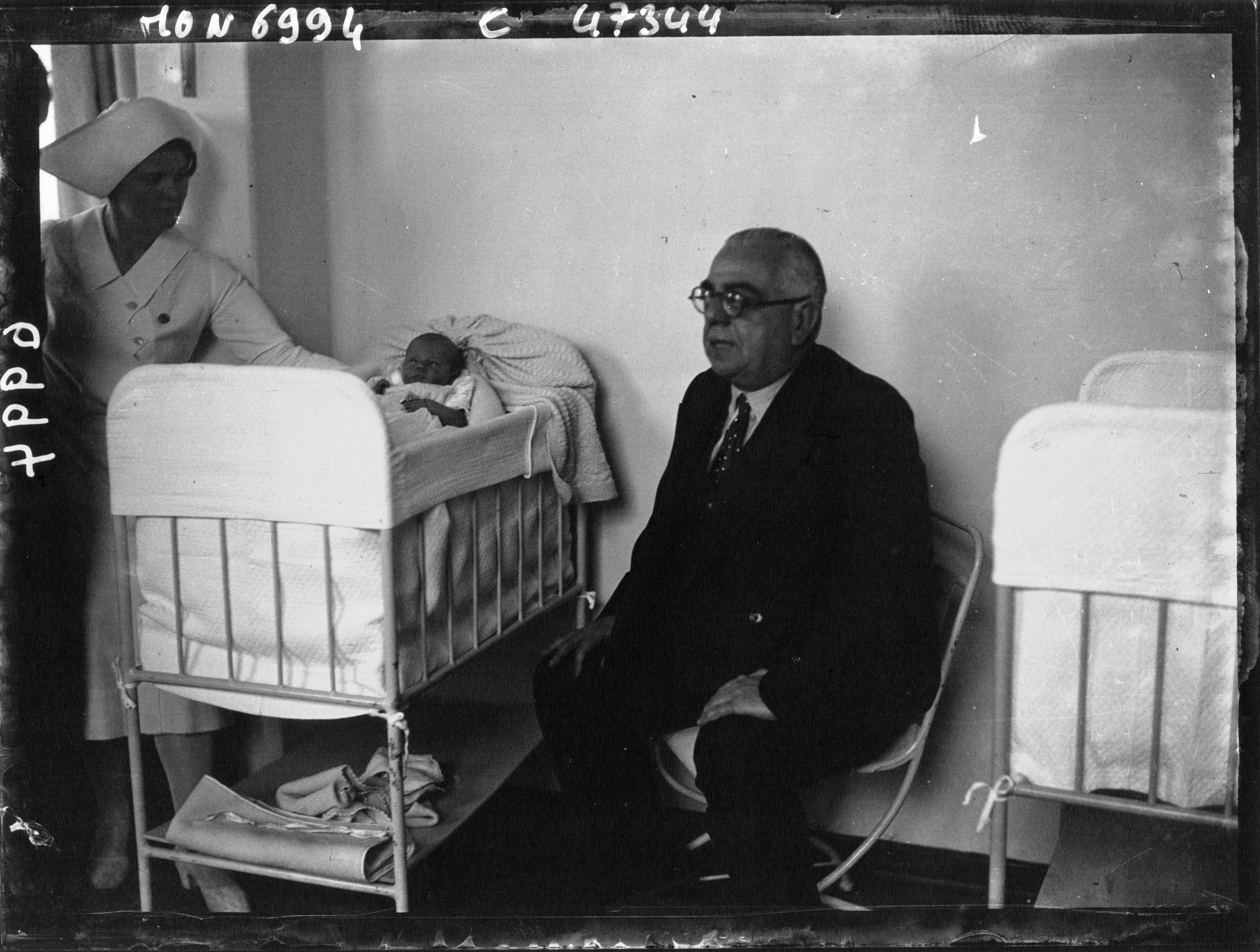
Sadruddin after his birth in 1933 with his father Aga Khan III.

Born in Neuilly-sur-Seine, France, he was the only child of Sultan Mahomed Shah (known by his title Aga Khan III) and his third wife, the French-born wife Andrée Joséphine Carron. He received his early education in Lausanne, Switzerland, before graduating Phi Beta Kappa in 1954 from Harvard College. At Harvard, he lived in Eliot House with Paul Matisse, grandson of French artist Henri Matisse, with future Paris Review founders George Plimpton and John Train, and with Stephen Joyce, grandson of Irish writer James Joyce. Along with Plimpton, he was an editor for the Harvard Lampoon. After three years of post-graduate research at the Harvard Center for Middle Eastern Studies, Sadruddin began a career in international service.

Although he was raised in Europe by his French mother, his father, who was the 48th hereditary Imam of the Nizari Ismaili Muslims, had a strong influence on him. He recalled that his father "insisted that I learnt the Koran and encouraged me to understand the basic traditions and beliefs of Islam but without imposing any particular views. He was an overwhelming personality but open-minded and liberal."

He described Iran as the cradle of his family, though he never lived there. When he was a child, his paternal grandmother used to recite to him the great epic poems of Persian history. He held British, French, Iranian, and Swiss citizenship, and was fluent in French, English, German and Italian, while also speaking some Persian and Arabic.

=== UNESCO ===
Sadruddin joined the United Nations Educational, Scientific and Cultural Organization (UNESCO) in 1958, and became the Executive Secretary to its International Action Committee for the Preservation of Nubia in 1961. This initiative brought together archaeologists from Eastern Europe and the West at the height of the Cold War. The construction of the Aswan Dam threatened ancient Egyptian treasures including Abu Simbel, the temples of Philae and Kalabsha, and the Christian churches of Nubia. He would later describe it as "one of UNESCO's great achievements" because of the challenging historical context in which it took place—in particular the ongoing tensions in the Middle East and the Cold War.

=== UN High Commissioner for Refugees ===
Sadruddin began as a Special Envoy to the United Nations High Commissioner for Refugees (UNHCR) in 1959 with a focus on World Refugee Year (1959–1960). The initiative became known for its Stamp Plan, a philatelic programme that raised funds through United Nations member countries, as well as the support of the Universal Postal Union. At the time, the UNHCR's resources were primarily focused on supporting refugees crossing from Eastern Europe.

In January 1966, Sadruddin was appointed United Nations High Commissioner for Refugees after serving for three years as Deputy High Commissioner. At the age of 33 he became the youngest person ever to lead the UNHCR. For the next twelve years he directed the UN refugee agency through one of its most difficult periods, coordinating the international response to the 1971 Bangladesh crisis that uprooted 10 million people, the 1972 exodus of hundreds of thousands of Hutus from Burundi to Tanzania, and the Vietnamese boat people tragedy of the mid-1970s. In 1972, Sadruddin played a key role in finding new homes for tens of thousands of South Asians expelled from Uganda by Idi Amin.

During the 1950s, the majority of refugees requiring assistance were of European origin, estimated between 200,000 and 300,000. By the 1970s, many of these European refugee issues had been largely addressed. At the same time, new refugee crises emerged in parts of the developing world, including Palestine, Vietnam, Angola, and Algeria. Under Sadruddin Aga Khan's tenure as United Nations High Commissioner for Refugees from 1966 to 1977, the agency's mandate expanded beyond its original focus on Europe to address these broader global displacement challenges.

This period saw an increase in the scale and complexity of refugee situations worldwide. The UNHCR and the wider international community adjusted their approaches accordingly. By the time Sadruddin Aga Khan stepped down in 1977, he was the longest-serving High Commissioner in the agency's history.

=== United Nations diplomatic career ===
From 1978 onwards, Sadruddin held several roles within the United Nations, including the Special Consultant and Chargé de Mission to the Secretary-General of the United Nations, Special Rapporteur of the UN Human Rights Commission and Convenor and co-chairman of the Independent Commission on International Humanitarian Issues and of the Independent Working Group on the UN Financial Emergency. He also served as Coordinator for United Nations Humanitarian and Economic Assistance Programmes Relating to the People of Afghanistan and as Executive Delegate of the Secretary-General for a UN Inter-Agency Humanitarian Programme addressing issues in Iraq's border areas.

In September 1990, he was appointed Personal Representative of the UN Secretary-General for Humanitarian Assistance Relating to the Crisis between Iraq and Kuwait. During this period, he negotiated with Iraqi officials, including Foreign Minister Tariq Aziz, to establish a UN relief program for Shia Muslims in the marshlands of southern Iraq, despite the Iraqi government's reluctance to coordinate with the UN.

Sadruddin Aga Khan was nominated twice for the position of UN Secretary-General. In 1981, although he received majority support in the Security Council vote, his appointment was vetoed by the Soviet Union, which reportedly considered him too Western. He was nominated again in 1991 but did not secure the position, with the United States and United Kingdom reportedly opposing him due to disagreements over his support for increasing aid to Iraq.

=== Environmental protection and advocacy ===
In 1977, Sadruddin Aga Khan co-founded the Geneva-based Groupe de Bellerive with Denis de Rougemont and the non-profit Bellerive Foundation. The foundation collaborated with international institutions, bilateral aid organizations, and NGOs such as the World Wide Fund for Nature (WWF). It focused on environmental protection, natural resource conservation, and biodiversity.

The Bellerive Foundation worked with UNICEF and other partners on initiatives related to deforestation. It promoted the development and distribution of low-cost, energy-efficient cooking stoves using renewable energy sources, primarily in rural African communities. The foundation's activities also addressed issues such as nuclear disarmament and species conservation

In 1990, Sadruddin launched Alp Action at the World Economic Forum to support environmental conservation in the European Alps. The program aimed to promote eco-tourism and reduce the environmental impact of outdoor recreational activities. Over its period of operation, Alp Action implemented projects across seven countries. It found inspiration in the system of national parks of the Canadian Rockies.

In May 2006, the activities of the Bellerive Foundation were incorporated into the Geneva-based Aga Khan Foundation to establish the Prince Sadruddin Aga Khan Fund for the Environment. The fund, with an endowment of approximately US$10 million, focuses on environmental education, natural resource management, protected areas, tourism infrastructure, environmental health, and research.

== Death and remembrance ==
Sadruddin Aga Khan died of cancer in Boston, Massachusetts, on 12 May 2003. His body was transported to Switzerland, where members of the diplomatic corps, government officials, and acquaintances paid respects at Château de Bellerive and signed condolence books at various locations internationally.

Ruud Lubbers, then UNHCR High Commissioner, then UNHCR High Commissioner, issued a statement acknowledging Sadruddin's tenure at the agency and his role during challenging periods.

In accordance with his wishes, a private burial ceremony was held in Switzerland with family members present. Traditional Muslim rites were also conducted. The funeral procession took place from Château de Bellerive to the local cemetery of Collonge-Bellerive. A tribute from the Canton of Geneva noted the family's historical ties to the region and referenced their Persian descent.

A memorial ceremony was held at United Nations headquarters in New York on 28 October 2003. At the event, then-UN Secretary-General Kofi Annan highlighted Sadruddin's contributions to humanitarian work and environmental issues.

He was survived by his wife Catherine, three stepsons—Alexandre, Marc, and Nicolas—and extended family including nephews, nieces, and cousins. It was his and Catherine's wish that their remains be interred in Egypt.

== Personal life ==
Sadruddin Aga Khan's family included several individuals with roles in political and international organizations. His grandmother was a descendant of Qajar Emperor Fath'Ali Shah.

His father served as President of the League of Nations and held administrative positions in British India. He also served two terms as President of the League of Nations. His half-brother Aly Khan was Pakistan's Ambassador to the United Nations. His nephew Karim Aga Khan was the 49th Imam of the Ismaili Muslims. Another nephew, Amyn Aga Khan, previously worked for the United Nations before joining the Aga Khan's secretariat. His niece Yasmin Aga Khan is involved in Alzheimer's disease advocacy.

He participated in cultural activities such as music, art, and literature, and attended cultural events in Europe and abroad. He engaged in outdoor activities including skiing and sailing. While a student at Harvard in 1953, he co-founded the Paris Review, a literary magazine. The magazine awards an annual fiction prize, the Aga Khan Prize for Fiction, established by his father.

=== Marriages ===
On 27 August 1957, he married Nina Dyer in Bellerive, Switzerland. Dyer, a former fashion model and ex-wife of Baron Hans Heinrich Thyssen-Bornemisza, converted to Islam during their marriage and adopted the name "Shirin." They divorced in 1962 and had no children. Dyer died by suicide in 1965.

On 25 November 1972, he married Catherine Aleya Beriketti Sursock in the British West Indies. She was previously married to Lebanese aristocrat Cyril Sursock. They had no children together, but he became stepfather to her three children: Alexandre, Marc, and Nicolas Sursock.

=== Art collection ===
Sadruddin Aga Khan assembled a private collection of Islamic art over approximately 50 years. The collection included paintings, drawings, manuscripts, and miniatures. He also collected primitive and African art, which he sold before 1985.

His interest in Islamic art reportedly began in his youth, influenced by his paternal grandmother's library of Persian books and related texts. During his time at Harvard in the 1950s, he made acquisitions in New York and later from dealers in Paris, Geneva, and London. He also participated in auctions at Sotheby's and Christie's. He sought advice from Stuart Cary Welch, a historian of Islamic art at Harvard.

His collection contains Arabic, Persian, Turkish, and Indian items dating from the 10th century onward. Examples include a Quranic page of North African origin written in Kufic script, estimated to be over 1,000 years old. The collection includes Persian calligraphy and pictorial works, as well as Ottoman manuscripts and paintings.

Some pieces from the collection were exhibited in New York, London, and Zürich. In 1998, the British Museum organized a touring exhibition titled "Princes, Poets and Paladins," which included items from the collection. The full collection is housed at the Aga Khan Museum in Toronto, established by his nephew.

== Awards and decorations ==
Sadruddin Aga Khan received honorary doctorates and national awards from several countries, including Pakistan, Poland, and the Vatican. In 1991, he was elected a Foreign Honorary Member of the American Academy of Arts and Sciences.

He received the United Nations Human Rights Award, and was awarded several national decorations:

- Bourgeois d'Honneur de Genève (City of Geneva)
- Commandeur of the Légion d'honneur (France)
- Knight Commander of the Order of St. Sylvester (Holy See)
- Order of the Nile (Egypt)
- Knight Commander of the Order of the British Empire – KBE (United Kingdom)

He also held honorary citizenship of Patmos, Greece, where he maintained a residence.

Political offices
Preceded by Félix Schnyder	United Nations High Commissioner for Refugees; 1966–1977	Succeeded by Poul Hartling
