= Diesel (donkey) =

Donkey known for joining herd of elk

- Species: Donkey
- Sex: Male
- Born: c. 2016; Nevada
- Owners: Terrie and Dave Drewry (2018–2019)
- Residence: Cache Creek Wilderness

Diesel (born c. 2016) is a donkey who went missing in the Cache Creek Wilderness in 2019. Born in the wild in Nevada, he was captured during a Bureau of Land Management roundup. He was then adopted by Terrie and Dave Drewry and lived on their ranch in California. During a hiking trip in 2019, he became spooked and ran off, disappearing into the wilderness. A weeks-long search for the donkey involving drones was unsuccessful.

Diesel was rediscovered living with a herd of wild elk in 2023. He was captured on video with the herd twice and a local warden suspected that the donkey was responsible for killing a mountain lion that showed evidence of being killed by a hoofed animal.

== Life ==
Diesel was born in the wild around 2016. He was captured in a remote region of Nevada during a roundup by the Bureau of Land Management. Terrie and Dave Drewry adopted Diesel from the agency in 2018 and took him to their ranch near Auburn, California. He lived on the ranch alongside chickens, sheep, llamas, and a miniature donkey named Jack. Diesel would respond to his name and enjoyed treats, including carrots, apples, unsalted peanuts, and horse cookies. Terrie Drewry indicated that Diesel was not aggressive, saying "he's a lover".

On April 20, 2019, Diesel accompanied Dave Drewry and a black llama on a weekend trail packing excursion in the Cache Creek Wilderness near the Judge Davis Trail by Wilson Flat. During their hike, something spooked Diesel and he bolted, dragging Drewry through the brush. Diesel's blue saddlebags were still attached when he ran off. Terrie speculated that a mountain lion spooked him. A weeks-long search for the donkey was conducted by the Drewrys and volunteers with SWARM Search and Rescue. Aerial drones and horses were deployed in the search, but they were unable to locate the donkey. On May 9, Diesel was seen in an image from a trail camera near the Judge Davis Trailhead. Hoofprints were also discovered that were believed to have belonged to Diesel.

Following Diesel's disappearance, there were no sightings of him for four years. He resurfaced in 2023 when Mikki Rhodes took a video of a donkey traveling with an elk herd. Another video, taken by triathlete Max Fennell in March or April of 2024, depicted the donkey as a member of an elk herd that included at least a dozen individuals. The video, taken a few miles from where Diesel had disappeared, circulated on social media sites and received widespread media coverage. A dead mountain lion that appeared to have been killed by a hoofed animal led a warden in the area to suspect that it had been killed by Diesel. Additionally, Fennell said that the donkey "might be the leader because as Diesel would move, the other [sic] elk would move". After seeing the video, Terrie Drewry positively identified the donkey as Diesel. She said "Finally, we know he's good. He's living his best life. He's happy. He's healthy, and it was just a relief." There are no plans to recapture Diesel who Drewry said has "earned his freedom".

Donkeys, which are considered an invasive species in California, may live up to 25 years in the wild.
