= Carmen Cervera =

Spanish socialite, art dealer and collector

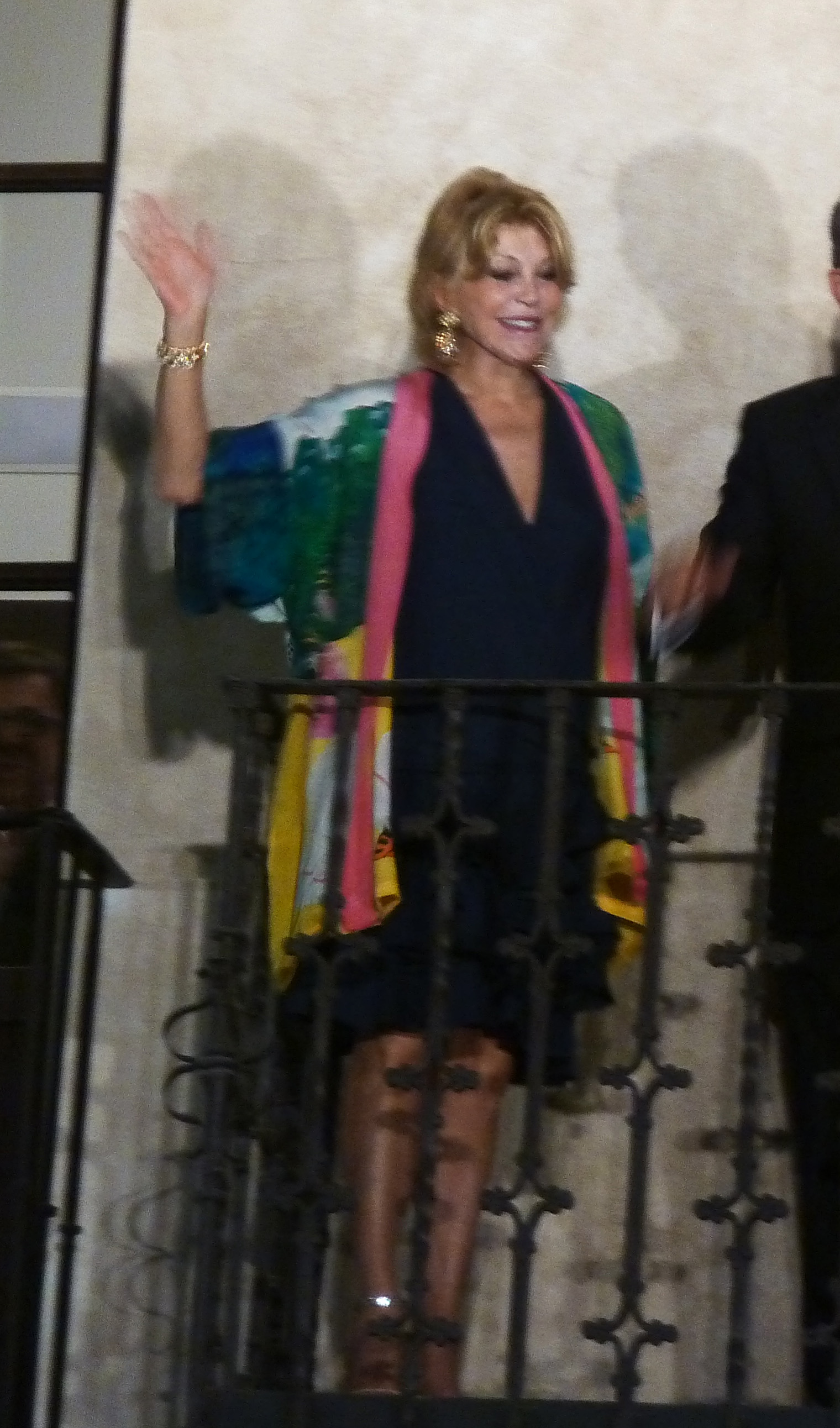
- Cervera at the inauguration of Museum Thyssen in Málaga
- Born: 23 April 1943 (age 82); Sitges, Spain
- Occupations: Philanthropist, socialite, art dealer/collector
- Known for: Miss Spain 1961
- Spouses: Lex Barker (m. 1965; div. 1972) Espartaco Santoni (m. 1975; div. 1978) Baron Hans Heinrich Thyssen-Bornemisza (m. 1985; died 2002)
- Children: 3
- Family: Thyssen

María del Carmen Rosario Soledad Cervera y Fernández de la Guerra, Dowager Baroness Thyssen-Bornemisza de Kászon et Impérfalva (German: María del Carmen Rosario Soledad Freifrau von Thyssen-Bornemisza de Kászon; born 23 April 1943), popularly known as Carmen "Tita" Cervera or Carmen "Tita" Thyssen, is a Spanish socialite, and art dealer, collector and beauty pageant titleholder.

== Biography ==
Cervera was born on 23 April 1943 in Sitges, the daughter of Enrique Cervera Manent and his wife, María del Carmen Fernández de la Guerra Álvarez (d. Madrid, 22 February 1992).

She was Miss Spain in 1961. She married firstly, as his fifth wife, on 6 March 1965 Lex Barker, secondly, in 1975 Espartaco Santoni, divorcing in 1978, and thirdly as his fifth wife, at Daylesford, Moreton-in-Marsh, Gloucestershire, on 16 August 1985, Baron Hans Heinrich Thyssen-Bornemisza.

None of her marriages had issue, but she had a son born out of wedlock, Alejandro (b. Madrid, 24 July 1980), with Manuel Segura. Hans Heinrich adopted her son, known as Alejandro Borja Thyssen-Bornemisza de Kászon et Impérfalva. As a widow, Carmen Cervera has also adopted twin baby girls (born in 2007 in United States), called María del Carmen and Guadalupe Sabina in July 2007.

In 2013 and 2016 Cervera was exposed by the International Consortium of Investigative Journalists for using complex offshore structures to gain tax advantages. Her spokesman stressed that she uses tax havens primarily because they give her "maximum flexibility" when she moves art from country to country.

== Art collection ==
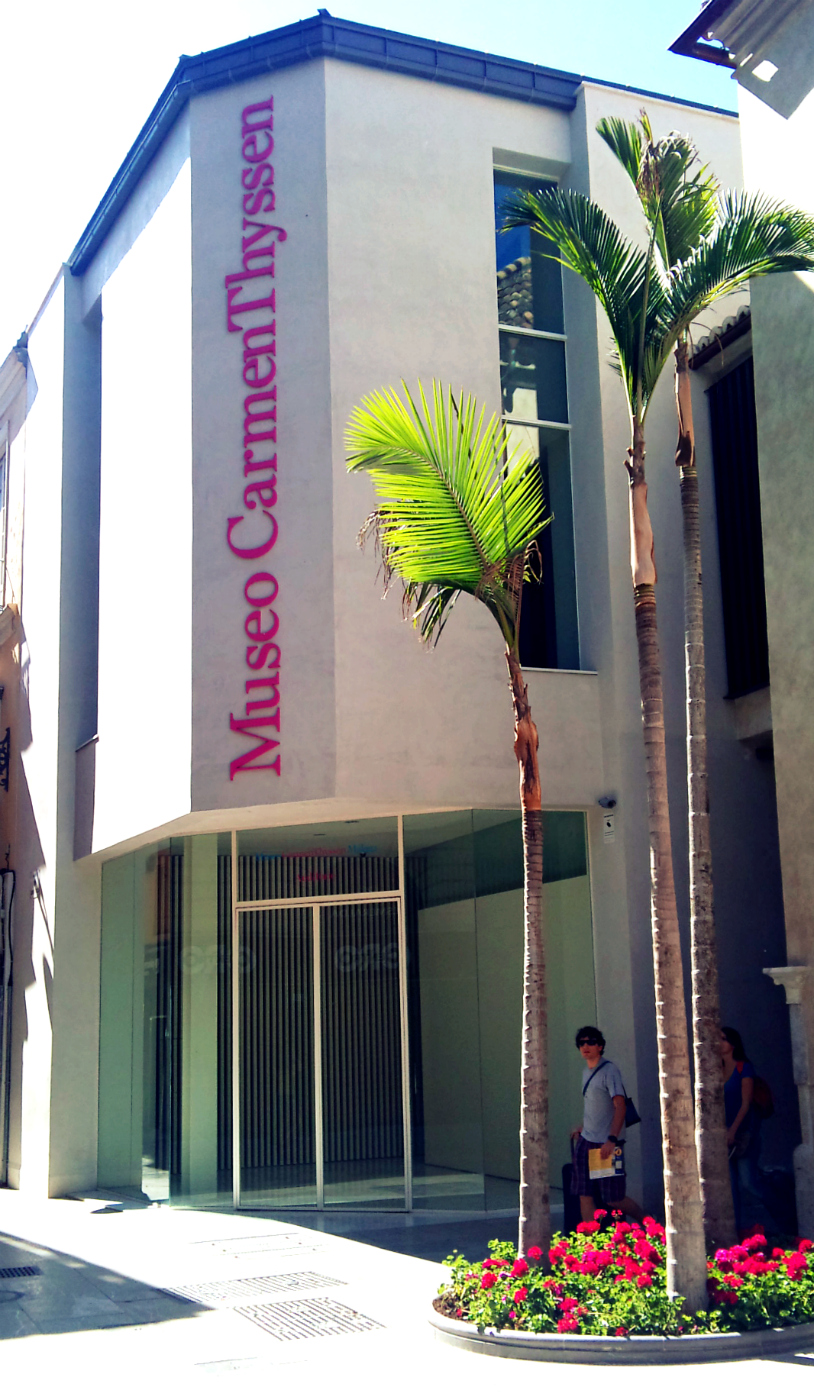
Museo Carmen Thyssen (Málaga).

She has been an art collector since the 1980s. Items from her collection can be seen at:

- the Thyssen-Bornemisza Museum in Madrid, which includes 200 works from the Carmen Thyssen-Bornemisza Collection
- the Carmen Thyssen Museum in Málaga, which opened in 2011.

Loans to other museums have been proposed, including a projected arts centre at Nuevo Baztan near Madrid.

In 2012, because of a relative lack of funds, she sold a valuable painting by English artist John Constable, The Lock. The painting made a world record price for this artist, as it had done when acquired in 1990.

== See also ==
- Thyssen-Bornemisza Museum
- Thyssen family
