= Thyssen family =

Prominent German family

Coat of arms of Hans Heinrich, Baron von Thyssen-Bornemisza

The Thyssen family has notable members, all of whom descend from Friedrich Thyssen, who have established steel works, elevators and escalators, industrial conglomerates, banks, and art collections - Thyssen AG, ThyssenKrupp and ThyssenKrupp Marine Systems. Originating in Germany, family members have taken up residence in various countries.

== Ancestors ==
The Thyssen family traces its origins to Isaak Lambert Thyssen (c. 1685–1773) who lived near Aachen in Germany. Isaak's first marriage to Johanna Wirtz produced a son Nikolaus Thyssen, who married and had a son of the same name, and he a son named Friedrich (1804–1877). Friedrich, a banker and wire producer, married his cousin Katharina Thyssen in 1838 and had two sons, August and Joseph.

August Thyssen founded the Thyssen Steel conglomerate and with wife Hedwig Pelzer had three children: Fritz, Heinrich, and Hedwig. August's brother Joseph assisted him in his business and with his wife Klara Bagel had two children: Julius and Hans.

Isaak Thyssen c.1685–1773 | Johanna Wirtz d.1728
Nikolaus Thyssen; 1727–1778 | Anna Maria Hungs; 1740–1825
Nikolaus Thyssen; 1763–1814 | Christine Nellessen; 1767–1818
Friedrich Thyssen; 1804–1877 | Katharina Thyssen; 1814–1888
Hedwig Pelzer; 1854–1940 | August Thyssen; 1842–1926 | Joseph Thyssen; 1844–1915 | Klara Bagel; 1856–1918
Fritz Thyssen; 1873–1951 | Heinrich Freiherr; Thyssen-Bornemisza; 1875–1947 | Hedwig Thyssen; 1878–1950 | Julius Thyssen; 1881–1946 | Hans Thyssen; 1890–1943

== More recent descendants ==
=== Fritz Thyssen ===
Fritz Thyssen (1873–1951) was head of the Thyssen mining and steelmaking company and founder of Vereinigte Stahlwerke AG, the biggest mining and steel cartel in the world prior to World War II. He was an early supporter of the Nazi Party, though this ended in 1938. He was found a "lesser offender" in the denazification tribunals after the war. In 1953 Vereinigte Stahlwerke AG was refounded as Thyssen AG, and with participation of his widow and daughter, merged with KruppHoesch to become ThyssenKrupp in 1997.

Fritz was married in 1900 to Amalie Zurhelle (1877–1965); the couple had a single child, Anna.

=== Heinrich Thyssen ===
Heinrich Freiherr Thyssen-Bornemisza de Kászon et Impérfalva (1875–1947), refused to participate in the Vereinigte Stahlwerke AG of his brother Fritz in 1926 and founded his own enterprise, including his father's foreign investments and some German companies apart from the Thyssen steelworks: August Thyssensche Unternehmungen des In- und Auslandes GmbH, today TBG (Thyssen-Bornemisza Group) Holdings N.V.. Heinrich married firstly 1906 Margit Freiin Bornemisza de Kászon et Impérfalva (1887–1971), divorced 1932 with issue; married secondly 1932 Else (Maud) Zarske adopted Feller (1909–), divorced 1937 without issue; wed thirdly 1937 Gunhild von Fabrice (1908–2008), divorced 1945 without issue

- Henrik Gábor István Ágost Baron Thyssen-Bornemisza de Kászon et Impérfalva (1907–1981) (called Stephen), wed 1stly 1929 Elisabeth Clarkson, wed 2ndly 1932 Ilona Kugler (1905–1992), wed 3rdly 1946 Ingeborg Muller, without issue (though I. Muller had a daughter, Birgit Muller (born 1942) from a previous marriage)
- Margit Gabriella Lujza Baroness Thyssen-Bornemisza de Kászon et Impérfalva (1911–1989), aka "The Killer Countess" (Rechnitz Massacre), (Note: During the final days of World War II, on 24 March 1945, she hosted a party for SS officers, Gestapo leaders, Nazi Youth, and local collaborators at the Thyssen's castle at Rechnitz. She, the daughter and heiress of European baron and tycoon Heinrich Thyssen, and her friends drank and danced the night away. At the height of the evening, just for fun, 12 of the guests boarded trucks or walked to a nearby field, where 180 Jewish slave laborers who had been building fortifications were assembled. They had already been forced to dig a large pit, strip, and get down on their knees. The guests took turns shooting them to death before returning to the party. Whether Margit herself personally killed anyone at the party is disputed.) wed 1933 Johann (Iván) Maria Josef Ladislaus Count Batthyány de Német-Ujvar (1910–1985): two children
- Gabrielle Wilhelmine Hedwige Marie Baroness Thyssen-Bornemisza de Kászon et Impérfalva (1915–), wed 1938 Adolf Willem Carel Baron Bentinck van Schoonheten (1905–1970), with issue
- Baron Hans Heinrich Thyssen-Bornemisza, aka "Heini" (1921–2002), founder of the Thyssen-Bornemisza Museum in Madrid

- 1st marriage 1946–50 with Princess Maria Theresa Amalia of Lippe-Weissenfeld (1925–2008), with issue :
- Georg Heinrich, Baron Thyssen-Bornemisza de Kászon et Impérfalva, aka "Heini Junior" (1950–2022), chairman of TBG, who has one son by Catharina Eleonore Countess von Meran-Brandhofen (1967–)
- 2nd marriage 1954–56 with Nina Sheila Dyer (1930–1965), she wed secondly 1957 Prince Sadruddin Aga Khan
- 3rd marriage 1956–65 with Fiona Frances Elaine Campbell-Walter (1932–), daughter of Rear Admiral Keith McNeill Campbell-Walter, with issue:
- Baroness Francesca Anne Thyssen-Bornemisza de Kászon et Impérfalva (1958–), wed 1993 Karl Habsburg-Lothringen, Archduke of Austria-Hungary, Head of the Imperial House of Habsburg, separated 2003 and divorced 2017, with issue:

- Eleonore (1994–)
- Ferdinand (1997–)
- Gloria (1999–)

- Baron Lorne Thyssen-Bornemisza de Kászon et Impérfalva (1963–) converted to Islam, married Alexandra Wright, with issue.
- 4th marriage 1967–84 with Brazilian heiress Liliane Denise Shorto (1942–), who would remain with him for 17 years and bear him another son:
- Baron Alexander Thyssen-Bornemisza de Kászon (1974-)
- 5th marriage 1985 with María del Carmen Rosario Soledad "Tita" Cervera Fernández de la Guerra (1943–)
- Borja Thyssen-Bornemisza (1980–) (Tita's natural son, adopted by his stepfather Baron Hans Heinrich Thyssen-Bornemisza) married 2007 Blanca Cuesta, with issue.

=== Hedwig Thyssen ===
Hedwig Thyssen (1878–1950), married firstly 1899 Ferdinand Freiherr von Neufforge (1869–1942), divorced 1908; married secondly 1908 Maximilian (Max) Freiherr von Berg (1859–1924), separated; with issue, three daughters and a natural son (this last who used his mother's maiden name).

=== Julius and Hans Thyssen ===
- Joseph Thyssen (1844–1915)
  - Julius Thyssen (1881–1946)
  - Hans Thyssen (1890–1943)
    - Bodo Thyssen (1918–2004), wed 1969 (divorced c. 1978) Renate Thyssen-Henne (née Kerkhoff, born 1939; her children by her previous marriage, with Helmut Friedhelm Homey, adopted the Thyssen name). Children include:
      - Gabriella Renate Thyssen (1963–) wed firstly in 1991 as his second wife Prince Karl Emich of Leiningen (divorced 1998), secondly in 1998 as his second wife The Aga Khan IV (separated 2004, and divorced 2011), and thirdly in 2025 as his third wife Wolfgang Porsche. She has issue from her first and second marriages: Princess Theresa of Leiningen (b. 1992) and Prince Aly Muhammad Aga Khan (b. 2000)
