= Thijssen =

Thijssen, Thijsen and Thijsse are Dutch patronymic surnames. The common Dutch given name Thijs is a short form of Mathijs (=Matthew). Thijssen is particularly common in the Dutch provinces of North Brabant and Limburg. People with this surname include:

Thijssen

- Angenelle Thijssen (born 1961), Dutch painter and glass artist
- Felix Thijssen (1933–2022), Dutch novelist
- François Thijssen (died 1638), Dutch explorer of the south coast of Australia
- Frans Thijssen (born 1952), Dutch footballer
- Gerben Thijssen (born 1998), Belgian racing cyclist
- Henny Thijssen (born 1952), Dutch singer and music producer
- Kees Thijssen (born 1975), Dutch draughts player
- Leon Thijssen (born 1968), Dutch show jumper
- Lynn Thijssen (born 1992), Dutch volleyball player
- Maerten Thijssen (died 1657), Dutch admiral who later became a Swedish nobleman
- Nicole Thijssen (born 1988), Dutch tennis player
- Theo Thijssen (1879–1943), Dutch writer, teacher and socialist politician
- Walter Thijssen (1877–1943), Dutch rower

Thijsen

- Ady Thijsen (born 1958), Aruban politician
- Cornelius Didrikson Thijsen Anckarstierna (1655–1714), Swedish admiral and noble born as Cornelis Thijsen

Thijsse

- Jac. P. Thijsse (1865–1945), Dutch conservationist and botanist

== See also ==
- Thyssen
