= Friedrich Thyssen =

German banker

Johann Friedrich Thyssen (1 October 1804 in Aachen – 25 May 1877 in Eschweiler) was a German banker and patriarch of the Thyssen family dynasty.

== Family ==
He was the son of Nikolaus Thyssen and wife Christine Nellessen. His family had settled in rural Aachen in the 18th century. On 1 October 1838 he married his cousin Katharina Thyssen in Aachen.

== Career ==
He was the initiator of the Thyssen fortune and the father of August Thyssen and Joseph Thyssen, both of whom joined his bank.

== See also ==
- Thyssen
- Thyssen family
