= August Thyssen =

German industrialist

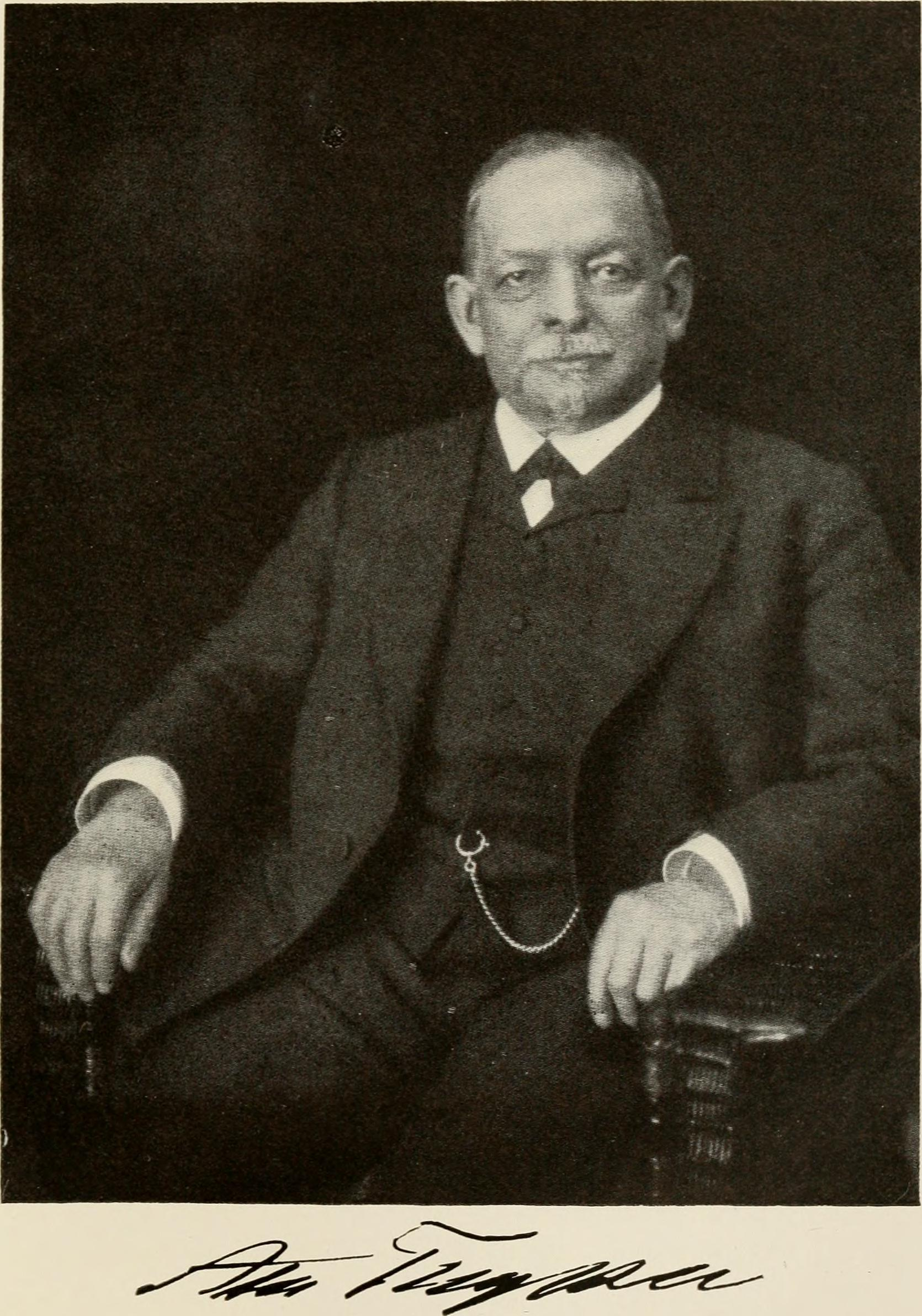
- Born: August Thyssen; 17 May 1847; Eschweiler, Kingdom of Prussia
- Died: 4 April 1926 (aged 83); Landsberg Castle, Ratingen, Weimar Republic
- Occupation: Industrialist
- Known for: Founding and leading Thyssen & Co
- Children: 5

August Thyssen (German: [ˈaʊɡʊst ˈtʏsn̩]; 17 May 1842 – 4 April 1926) was a German industrialist, founder and controlling shareholder of Thyssen & Co that became ThyssenKrupp. He was a prominent member of the Thyssen family.

== Early life and education ==
Thyssen was born 17 May 1842 in Eschweiler, Kingdom of Prussia, the third of nine children, to Friedrich Thyssen, a private banker and progenitor of the Thyssen family, and Katharina Thyssen. His parents were first cousins. He studied mechanical engineering at the Karlsruhe Institute of Technology and economics in Antwerp, Belgium.

== Career ==
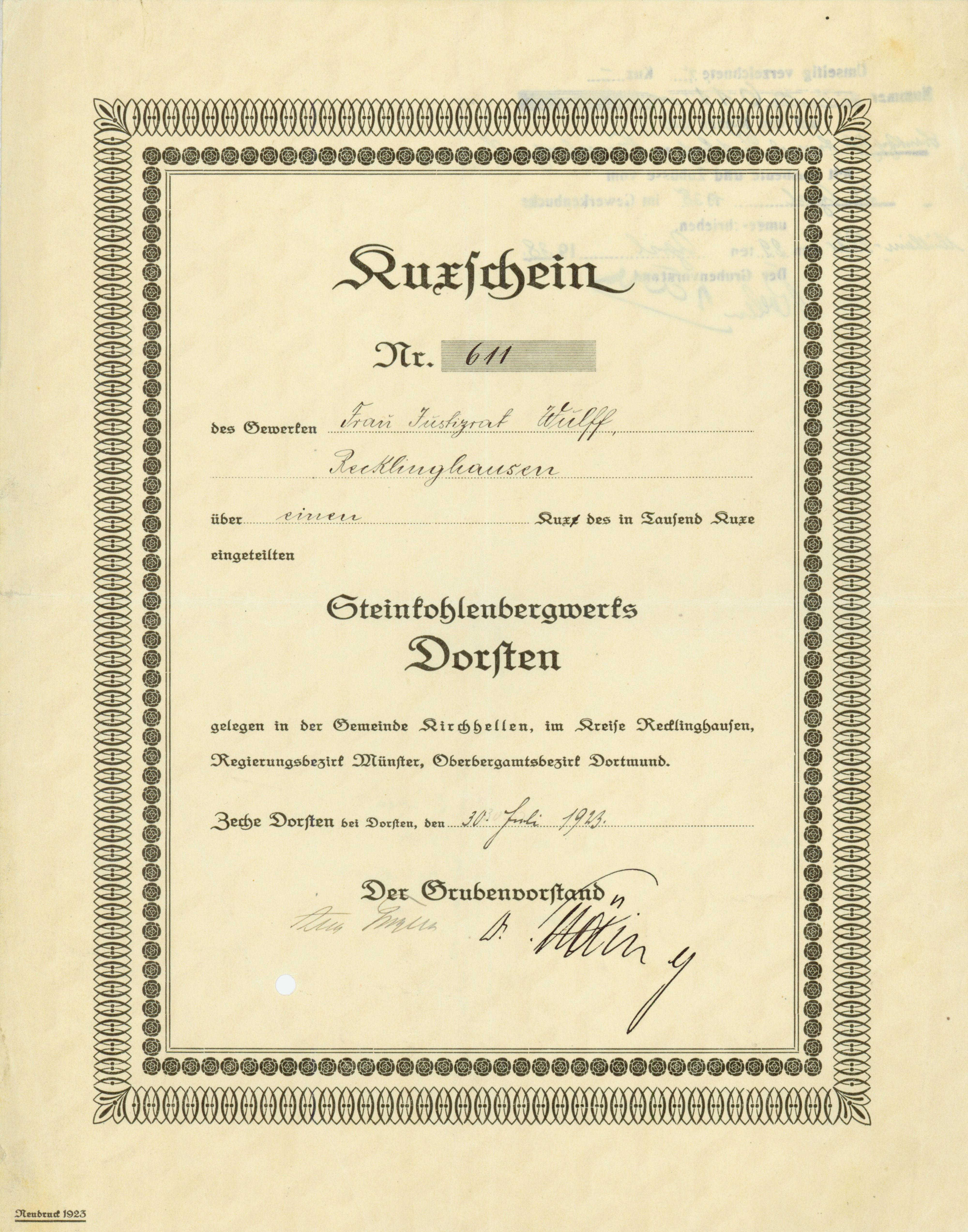
Share of the coal mine Steinkohlenbergwerk Dorsten, issued 30 July 1923, signed by director August Thyssen

After he had completed his studies at the RWTH Aachen University, University of Karlsruhe and a commercial school (Institut Supérieur du Commerce de l’État) at Antwerp he like his brother Joseph Thyssen joined the bank of his father Friedrich Thyssen.

In 1867 Thyssen and several members of his family founded the iron works "Thyssen-Foussol & Co" in Duisburg. When this company was dissolved in 1870, he used the new capital to establish with his father the "Walzwerk Thyssen & Co" that would become the base of an industrial empire in the industrialized Mülheim an der Ruhr, where the high of iron and steel prizes contributed to the making of his fortune. Initially he managed different companies separately in a decentralized fashion, but eventually he united them through a holding company. The largest company of his was the coal mining company "Gewerkschaft Deutscher Kaiser" in Hamborn (now part of Duisburg) that he had acquired in 1891.

He built the first 500-ton blast furnace in Germany, the first 100-ton Martin furnace, and the first large tube (iron pipe size) works. Together with Hugo Stinnes Thyssen was a cofounder of RWE. The Thyssen conglomerate became the nucleus of Vereinigte Stahlwerke AG, the biggest mining and steel cartel in the world, prior to World War II. Thyssen was refounded in 1953 and joined with KruppHoesch to become ThyssenKrupp in 1997.

Thyssen purchased most of Beeckerwerth, including Haus Knipp, in the early 20th century. He was the first in his family to start acquiring a collection of works of art, including six pieces by his friend sculptor Auguste Rodin. Thyssen's firm was a vertically integrated company, controlling all aspects of the steelmaking process. He owned his own fleet of ships, a network of docks and a railroad. Although he was one of the richest men in Germany, to the day he died his ethos was "If I rest, I rust." He lived a simple life; he ran his empire from a dingy office in Mülheim, drove an old car, wore off-the-peg suits, and was known to drink and eat with his workers. He was also an ardent republican.

In the winter of 1916-1917 (during the first World War) August Thyssen stayed at a health resort in Switzerland in seclusion. A rumor floated that he was unhappy with Germany's conduct of the war. Shortly after a pamphlet circulated in neutral countries, and a few weeks later in England and the United States. It was considered the most sensational document of the war.

The pamphlet contained terrible accusations against the Kaiser and the German government, dating back to 1912 when Wilhelm II submitted war plans from the General Staff to a section of German big business asking financial and economic support for the war in exchange for expansion opportunities after the war. The war was not supposed to last more than a year, and subsequently the General Staff kept asking for more money as time dragged on and the war wasn't over, and never offered the expansion that was promised.

Thyssen was asked to contribute $100,000 in the most recent loan, but he refused. In turn, his contracts with the state were cancelled, and his enterprise put under state control. He returned to Germany in 1917, and never made a statement as to the authenticity of the pamphlet. He continued to lead a secluded life in his Landsberg castle, and management soon went to his son Fritz. The business survived the collapse of 1918 and the revolutionary disorders that followed.

"The House of Thyssen has served every master who promised to conquer the world and share the booty with the Thyssens. Both Thyssens, father [Arthur] and son [Fritz], were Pan-Germans and Nazis, who promoted and financed the plans of world conquest because they sought to extend their own business. Long before the outbreak of the First World War, August Thyssen was the originator of the Moroccan crisis of 1904-1905 which nearly led to a German attack on France. Thyssen had planned to grant a loan to the Sultan of Morocco in return for the right to exploit the Moroccan iron mines. This was the best opportunity, he declared, to settle accounts with France on the battlefields. The Berlin government shared these views, but beat a hasty retreat upon learning that England would stand by France."

Thyssen died in 1926 of pneumonia following complications from eye surgery.

== Personal life ==
On 3 December 1872 in Mülheim an der Ruhr he married Hedwig Pelzer (1854–1940), daughter of Johann-Heinrich Pelzer and wife Hedwig Troost. They divorced in 1885. The four children during the marriage were Fritz, August, Heinrich and Hedwig. To avoid the possibility that his divorce would lead to a partitioning of his industrial empire, Thyssen transferred the property to his children, but retained the management rights for himself during his lifetime. The children were;

- Friedrich "Fritz" Thyssen (1873–1951), industrialist
- August Thyssen (Mülheim an der Ruhr, 25 September 1874 – Munich, 13 June 1943), never married and had no children
- Heinrich Freiherr Thyssen-Bornemisza de Kászon et Impérfalva (1875–1947), industrialist and art collector
- Hedwig Thyssen (Mülheim an der Ruhr, 19 December 1878 – Kreuzlingen, Thurgau, 31 July 1950), married firstly in Mülheim an der Ruhr on 28 August 1899 and divorced in 1908 Ferdinand Freiherr von Neufforge (Aachen, 30 August 1869 – Davos, 7 September 1942), married secondly in London, 9 February 1908 Maximilian (Max) Freiherr von Berg (Steierdorf, Krassó-Szörény vm, 1 May 1859 – Neu-Friedenheim, 25 March 1924); she had a natural son, named Bodo, who used his mother's last name.

== See also ==
- Thyssen AG, steel company
- Thyssen family
