= Private collection =

Privately owned collection of works, usually a collection of art

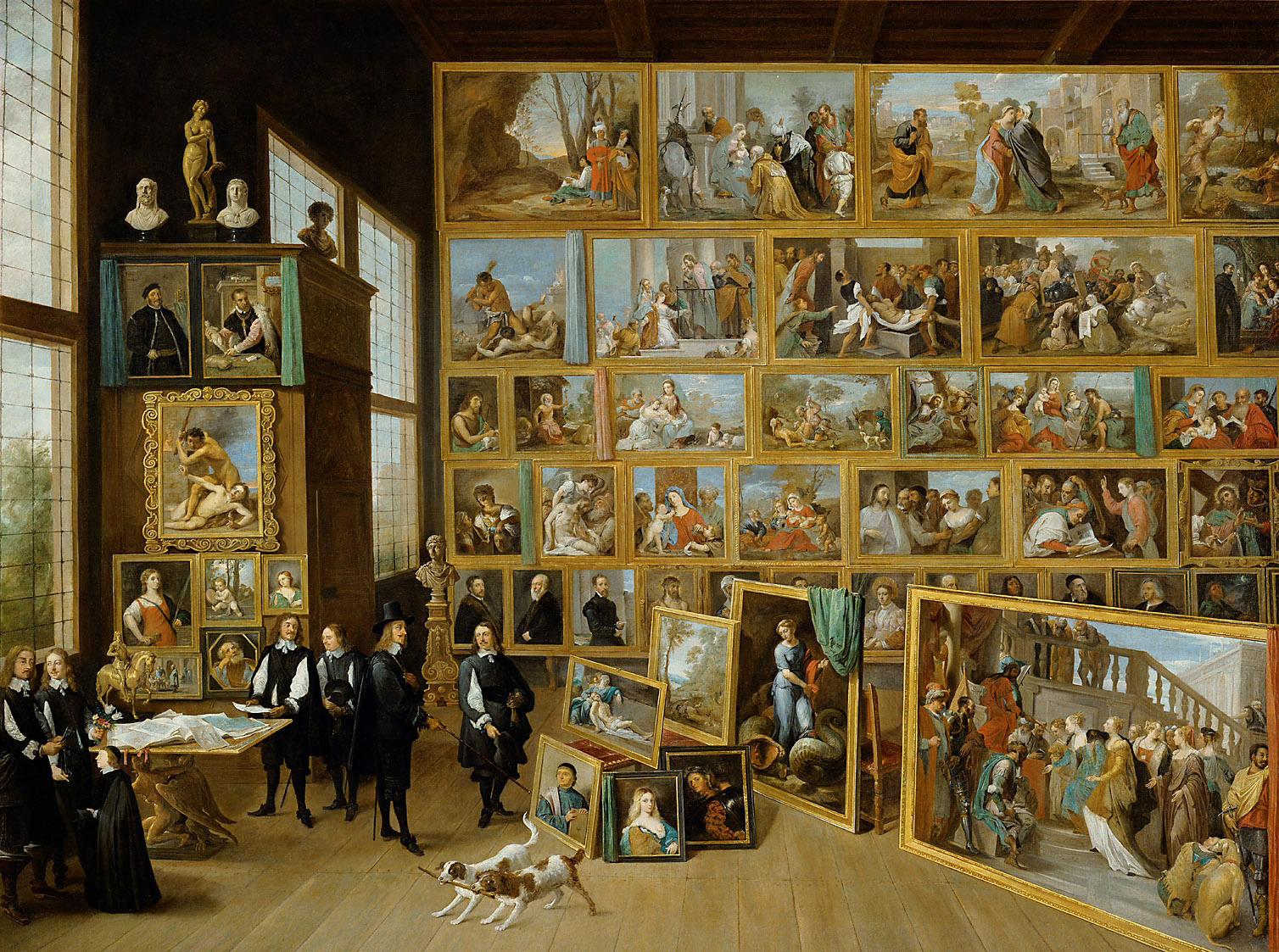
A painting c. 1651 by David Teniers the Younger depicting part of the famous collection formed by Archduke Leopold Wilhelm of Austria.

A private collection is a privately owned collection of works (usually artworks) or valuable items. In a museum or art gallery context, the term signifies that a certain work is not owned by that institution, but is on loan from an individual or organization, either for temporary exhibition or for the long term. This source is usually an art collector, although it could also be a school, church, bank, or some other company or organization. By contrast, collectors of books, even if they collect for aesthetic reasons (fine bookbindings or illuminated manuscripts for example), are called bibliophiles, and their collections are typically referred to as libraries.

== History ==
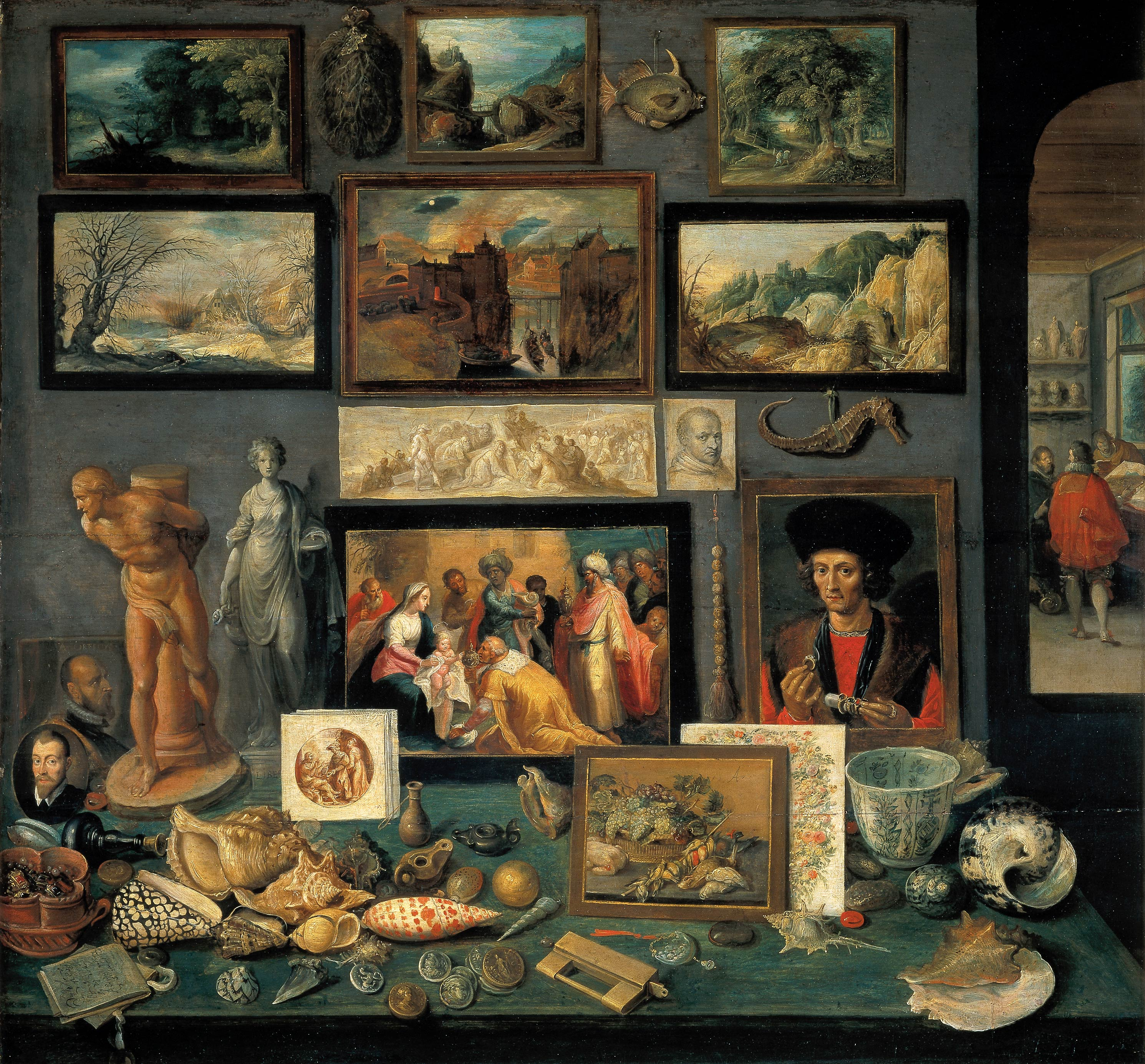
This corner of a cabinet of curiosities, painted by Frans II Francken in 1636, reveals the range of connoisseurship a Baroque-era virtuoso might evince.

Art collecting was common among the wealthy in the Ancient World in both Europe and East Asia, and in the Middle Ages, but developed in its modern form during the Renaissance and continues to the present day. The royal collections of most countries were originally the grandest of private collections but are now mostly in public ownership. However the British Royal Collection remains under the care of the Crown, though distinguished from the private property of the British royal family. The cabinet of curiosities was an important mixed form of collection, including art and what we would now call natural history or scientific collections. These were formed by royalty but smaller ones also by merchants and scholars.

The tastes and habits of collectors have played a very important part in determining what art was produced, providing the demand that artists supply. Many types of objects, such as medals, engravings, small plaquettes, modern engraved gems and bronze statuettes were essentially made for the collector's market. By the 18th century all homes of the well-to-do were expected to contain a selection of objects, from paintings to porcelain, that could form part of an art collection, and the collections of those who would normally qualify for the term had to be considerably larger, and some were enormous. Increasingly collectors tended to specialize in one or two types of work, although some, like George Salting (1835–1909), still had a very wide scope for their collections. Apart from antiquities, which were regarded as perhaps the highest form of collecting from the Renaissance until relatively recently, and also books, paintings and prints from the late 15th century onwards, until the 18th century collectors tended to collect fairly new works from Europe. The extension of serious collecting to art from all periods and places was an essentially 19th-century development, or at least dating to the Age of Enlightenment. Trecento paintings were little appreciated until about the 1830s, and Chinese ritual bronzes and jades until perhaps the 1920s. Collecting of African art was rare until after World War II.

In recognition of its importance in influencing the production of new art and the preservation of old art, art collecting has been an area of considerable academic research in recent decades, having been somewhat neglected previously.

== Famous art collections ==
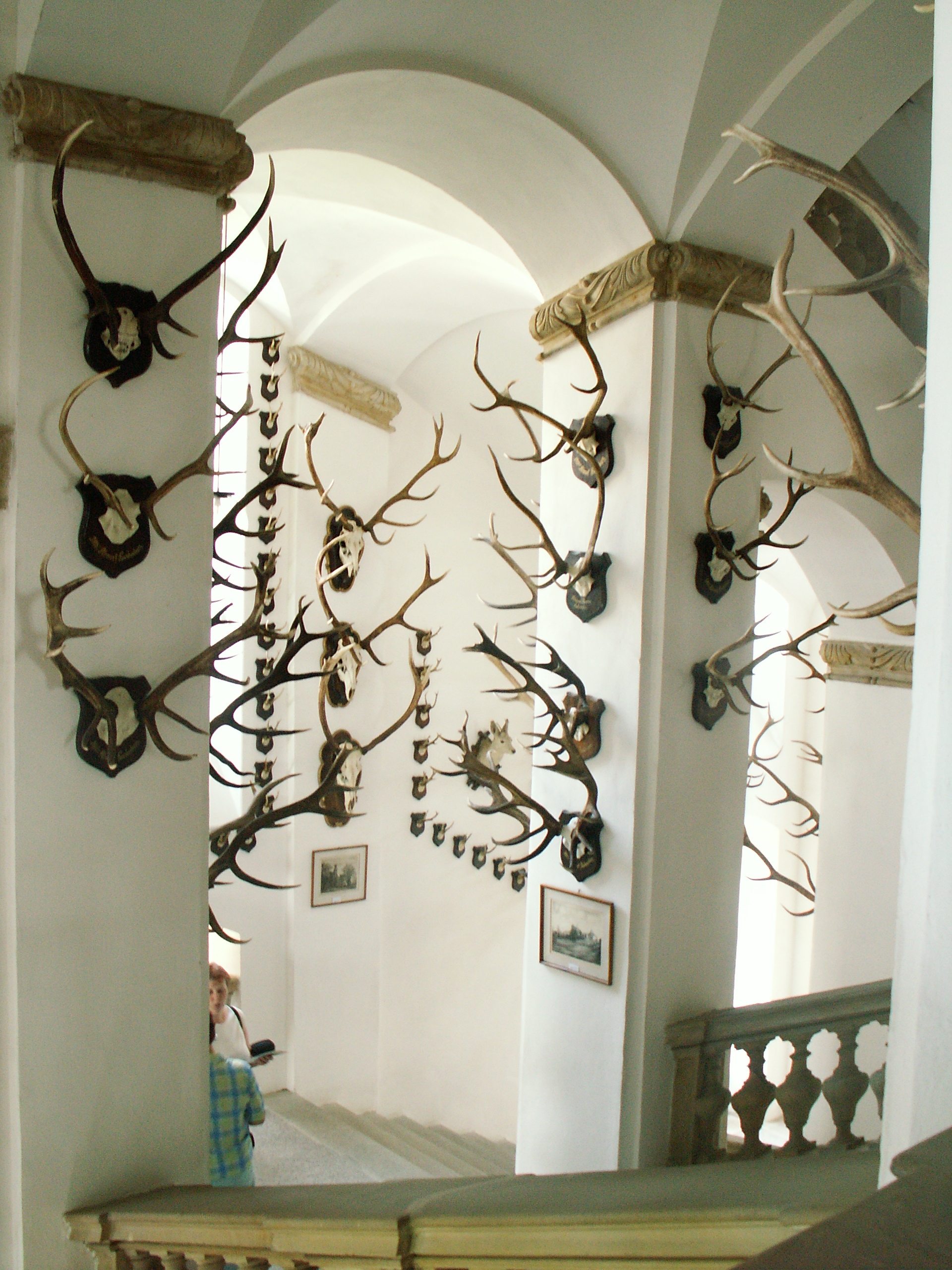
Trophy collection of the Princely Family of Liechtenstein at Úsov Château, Czech Republic.

Very famous collections that are now dispersed include the Borghese Collection and Farnese collection in Rome, and the Orleans Collection in Paris, mostly sold in London. When this happens, it can be a large loss to those interested in art as the initial vision of the collector is lost.

The Princely Family of Liechtenstein have works by such artists as Hals, Raphael, Rembrandt and Van Dyck, a collection containing some 1,600 works of art, but were unable to show them since 1945 when they were smuggled out of Nazi Germany. The works were finally displayed in the Liechtenstein Museum after nearly 60 years with most in storage. The important collection of the Thyssen family, mostly kept in the Thyssen-Bornemisza Museum, which settled in Madrid in 1992, was bought by the Spanish state. Only an exhibited part, the collection of Carmen Cervera, widow of the late Baron Thyssen, remains private but exhibited separately in the museum.

Many collections were left to the public in some form, and are now museums, or the nucleus of a museum's collection. Most museums are formed around one or more formerly private collections acquired as a whole. Major examples where few or no additions have been made include the Wallace Collection and Sir John Soane's Museum in London, the Frick Collection and Morgan Library in New York, The Phillips Collection in Washington, D.C., and the Museu Calouste Gulbenkian in Lisbon.

Other collections remain complete but are merged into larger collections in museums. Some important 19th/20th examples are:

- The Waddesdon Bequest of Renaissance objects was bequeathed to the British Museum, where it is displayed in its own room (a condition of the bequest), as is the Percival David Collection of Chinese porcelain. Many other bequests or purchased collections are split up within the museum's collection.
- Sergei Shchukin, was an important Russian art collector, mainly of French Impressionist and Post-Impressionist art. His collection is now divided between the Pushkin Museum of Fine Arts in Moscow and the State Hermitage Museum in St. Petersburg.
- The Charles Lang Freer collection became an important part of the Smithsonian—the Freer Gallery of Art.
- Count Antoine Seilern bequeathed the bulk of his art collection to the Courtauld Institute of Art in 1978 where it is known as the Princes Gate Collection, which was also the title of the catalogue of the collection.
- When the banker Robert Lehman died in 1969, his foundation donated 2,600 works of art to the Metropolitan Museum of Art in New York. Housed in the "Robert Lehman Wing", the museum refers to the collection as "one of the most extraordinary private art collections ever assembled in the United States". To emphasize the personal nature of the Robert Lehman collection, the Met housed the collection in a special set of galleries which evoked the interior of Lehman's richly decorated townhouse; this intentional separation of the collection as a "museum within the museum" met with mixed criticism and approval at the time, though the acquisition of the collection was seen as a coup for the Met. Unlike other departments at the Met, the Robert Lehman collection does not concentrate on a specific style or period of art; rather, it reflects Lehman's personal interests.
