= Joseph Thyssen =

German businessman

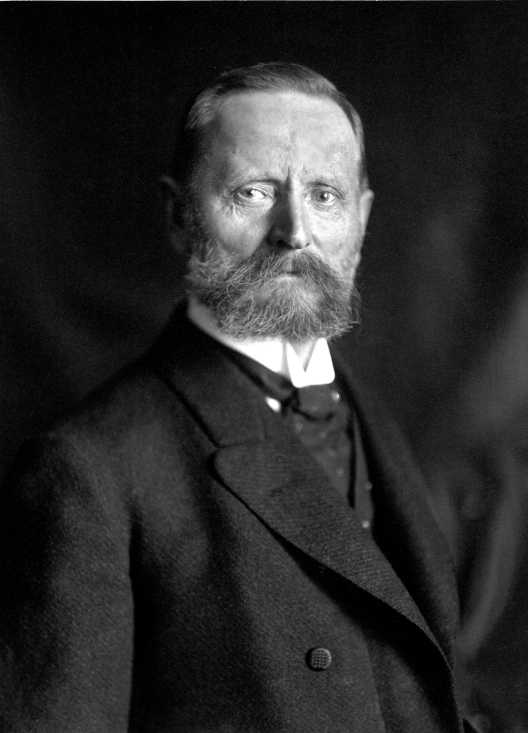
- Born: Joseph Thyssen; 14 February 1844; Eschweiler, Kingdom of Prussia
- Died: 15 July 1915 (aged 71); Mülheim an der Ruhr, Kingdom of Prussia
- Resting place: Alter Friedhof
- Occupation: Industrialist
- Years active: 1877–1915
- Organization(s): Thyssen & Cie
- Spouse: m. 1880 Klara Bagel

Joseph Thyssen, also Josef Thyssen (14 February 1844 – 15 July 1915), was a German industrialist and a member of the Thyssen family. He was the son of Friedrich Thyssen and the younger brother of August Thyssen, and was also his closest colleague and confidant.

Since 1984, his former residence Villa Josef Thyssen in Mülheim an der Ruhr has been listed as a protected monument. The villa was also featured in the film Mutters Maske (1987) directed by Christoph Schlingensief.

== Biography ==
Thyssen was born in Eschweiler. After working with his brother in the banking business of their father, Thyssen was co-owner since 1877 August Thyssen's Styrum Mill Thyssen & Co. He held this position in various supervisory and management bodies of the Thyssen Group. Among other things, he was a founding board member of the Mülheim Mining Association from 1898. In 1900 he moved with his family to his newly built Villa Josef Thyssen by the River Ruhr.

In 1880 he married Klara Bagel, the daughter of a Mülheim publishing family (1856–1918). The couple had three children: Julius (1881–1946), Johanna (1883–1887) and Hans (1890–1943). In 1915 Joseph Thyssen died at the plant in Mülheim an der Ruhr, having fallen between two rail car buffers during an evening patrol. He was buried in the Old Cemetery (Old Cemetery) in Mülheim an de Ruhr.
