= Fritz Thyssen =

German businessman (1873–1951)

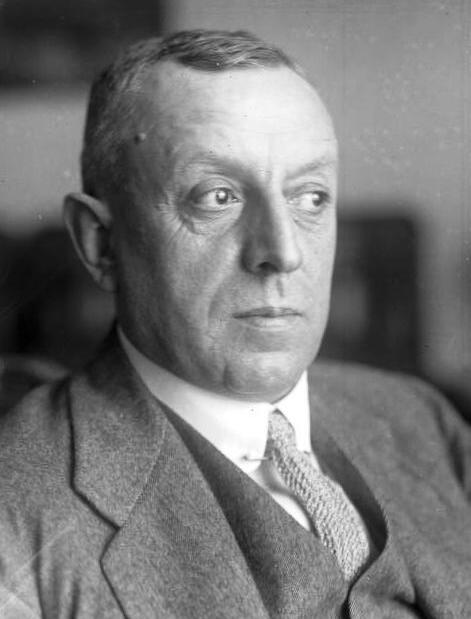
- Fritz Thyssen in 1928
- Born: Friedrich Thyssen; 9 November 1873; Styrum, Kreis Duisburg, Regierungsbezirk Düsseldorf, Rhine Province, German Empire
- Died: 8 February 1951 (aged 77); Buenos Aires, Argentina
- Occupation: Businessman
- Spouse: Amélie zur Helle (1877–1965)
- Children: Anita, married Gräfin Zichy-Thyssen (1909–1990)

Friedrich "Fritz" Thyssen (9 November 1873 – 8 February 1951) was a German businessman, born into one of Germany's leading industrial families. He was an early supporter and financial backer of the Nazi Party but later broke with it. He was arrested in 1941 and was confined in Nazi concentration camps. Liberated at the end of the war in Europe, he was found to be a "lesser offender" in denazification proceedings and was fined. He emigrated to Argentina in 1950 where he died.

== Youth ==
Thyssen was born in Mülheim in the Ruhr area. His father, August, was head of the Thyssen mining and steelmaking company, founded by his father Friedrich and based in the Ruhr city of Duisburg. Friedrich studied mining and metallurgy in London, Liège, and Berlin, and after a short period in the Prussian Army (1896/97 with the Westphalian Uhlan Regiment No. 5), joined the family business. On 18 January 1900 in Düsseldorf he married Amelie Helle or Zurhelle (Mülheim am Rhein, 11 December 1877 – Puchdorf bei Straubing, 25 August 1965), daughter of a factory owner. Their only child, Anna (Anita; later Anita Gräfin Zichy-Thyssen), was born in 1909. Thyssen again joined the army in 1914 and served on the Western Front, but was soon discharged on account of a lung condition. In 1917, he was promoted to Rittmeister of the reserves.

== Weimar Germany ==
Thyssen was a German nationalist who supported Nazism, believing that limited government control of production and ownership of banking and transportation was a means of preventing the spread of full-fledged communism. In 1923, when French and Belgian troops occupied the Ruhr to punish Germany for not meeting its reparations payments in full, he took part in the nationalist resistance against the occupiers, leading the Ruhr steelmakers in refusing to co-operate in producing coal and steel for them. He was arrested, imprisoned and received a large fine for his activities, which made him a national hero. Through the 1920s, the Thyssen companies continued to expand. Thyssen took over the Thyssen companies on his father's death in 1926, and that same year he formed United Steelworks (Vereinigte Stahlwerke AG), controlling more than 75 percent of Germany's iron ore reserves and employing 200,000 people. He played a prominent role in German commercial life, as head of the German Iron and Steel Industry Association and the Reich Association of German Industry, and as a board member of the Reichsbank.

In 1923, Thyssen met former general Erich Ludendorff, who advised him to attend a speech given by Adolf Hitler, leader of the Nazi Party. Thyssen was impressed by Hitler and his bitter opposition to the Treaty of Versailles, and began to make large donations to the party, including 100,000 gold marks (worth about $25,000 at the time, or about $450,000 in 2025 dollars) in 1923 to Ludendorff. In this he was unusual among German business leaders, as most were traditional conservatives who regarded the Nazis with suspicion. Thyssen's principal motive in supporting the Nazis was his great fear of communism; he had little confidence that the various German anti-communist factions would prevent a Soviet-style revolution in Germany unless the popular appeal of communism among the lower classes was co-opted by an anticommunist alternative. Postwar investigators found that he had donated 650,000 ℛ︁ℳ︁ to right-wing parties, mostly to the Nazis, although Thyssen himself claimed to have donated 1 million ℛ︁ℳ︁ to the Nazi Party. Thyssen remained a member of the German National People's Party until 1932 and did not join the Nazi Party until 1933.

In November, 1932, Thyssen and Hjalmar Schacht were the main organisers of a letter to President Paul von Hindenburg to urge him to appoint Hitler as Chancellor. Thyssen also persuaded the Association of German Industrialists to donate three million Reichsmarks to the Nazi Party for the March 1933 Reichstag election. In 1933, the artist John Heartfield depicted Thyssen as the puppetmaster manipulating Hitler on the cover of communist magazine Arbeiter Illustrierte Zeitung (AIZ, Workers' Illustrated Newspaper).

== Nazi Germany ==
Thyssen welcomed the Nazi suppression of leftist organisations such as the Communist Party, the Social Democratic Party, and trade unions. On 11 July 1933, he was among the first members appointed to the Council of State of Prussia, the largest German state. At the November 1933 parliamentary election, he was elected to the Reichstag from electoral constituency 22 (Düsseldorf East) and retained this seat until his break with the Nazis in September 1939. Thyssen also became a member of Hans Frank's Academy for German Law in 1933. In 1934, he was one of the business leaders who persuaded Hitler to suppress the SA, leading to the "Night of the Long Knives".

Thyssen accepted the anti-Jewish legislation in pre-war Nazi Germany that excluded Jews from business and professional life, and dismissed his Jewish employees. But as a Catholic, he objected to the increasing Nazi persecution of the Catholic Church in Germany, which gathered pace after 1935: in 1937 he sent a letter to Hitler, protesting at the persecution of Christians in Germany. The breaking point for Thyssen was the violent pogrom against the Jews in November 1938, known as Kristallnacht, which caused him to resign from the Prussian Council of State. By 1939, he was also bitterly criticising Nazi economic policies, which focused on rearmament in preparation for war.

== World War II ==
On 1 September 1939, the invasion of Poland marked the commencement of World War II. Thyssen sent Hermann Göring a telegram saying he was opposed to the war, shortly after arriving in Switzerland with his family. He was expelled from the Nazi Party and the Reichstag, and his company was nationalised. The company was returned to other members of the Thyssen family several years after the war.

In 1940, Thyssen took refuge and moved to France, intending to emigrate to Argentina, but was caught up in the German invasion of France and the Low Countries while he was visiting his ill mother in Belgium.

In 1941, Thyssen fled Germany, but he was arrested by Vichy France in a hotel in Nice and sent back to Germany, where he was confined, first in a sanatorium near Berlin, then from 1943 in Sachsenhausen concentration camp. His wife Amelie did not escape to Argentina and spent the whole war in the concentration camp with her husband.

In February 1945, Thyssen was sent to Dachau concentration camp. He was comparatively well-treated and transferred to Tyrol in late-April 1945 together with other prominent inmates, where the SS left the prisoners behind. He was liberated by the 42nd Infantry Division and 45th Infantry Division on 5 May 1945.

== Later life ==
Thyssen was tried for being a supporter of the Nazi Party. He did not deny that he had been a Nazi supporter until 1938, and he accepted responsibility for his companies' mistreatment of Jewish employees in the 1930s, although he denied involvement in the employment of slave labour during the war. On 2 October 1948, a denazification tribunal declared Thyssen a lesser offender and sentenced him to a fine of 15% of his assets. Thyssen agreed to pay 500,000 Deutschmarks (equivalent to €1,652,535 in 2021) as compensation to those who suffered as a result of his actions, and was acquitted of other charges.

In January 1950, he and his wife emigrated to Buenos Aires, where he died in 1951. In 1953, Thyssen was buried in the family mausoleum in Mülheim.

== Legacy ==
In 1959, Thyssen's widow Amélie and daughter, Anita Countess Zichy-Thyssen established the Fritz Thyssen Foundation to advance science and the humanities, with a capital of 100 million Deutschmarks (equivalent to €246 million 2021). Amélie Thyssen died in 1965. Anita Countess Zichy-Thyssen ran the Foundation until her death in 1990. The family has had a dispute over the running of the Foundation.

== I Paid Hitler ==
While Thyssen was imprisoned in Germany, a memoir was published in the United Kingdom and the United States, in 1941, under the title I Paid Hitler. The book was ghostwritten by the journalist Emery Reves, the memoirs are seen as unreliable by historians. Thyssen himself repeatedly denounced the authenticity of the memoirs, once referring to them as a 'literary forgery'.

Thyssen, Fritz; Reves, Emery (1941). I Paid Hitler. Translated by Saerchinger, César. Farrar & Rinehart; Hodder and Stoughton – via Archive.org.
