= Vereinigte Stahlwerke =

Defunct German industrial conglomerate

Logo of the Vereinigte Stahlwerke AG since 1926.

The Vereinigte Stahlwerke AG (VSt or Vestag, United Steel Works) was a German industrial conglomerate producing coal, iron, and steel in the interbellum and during World War II.

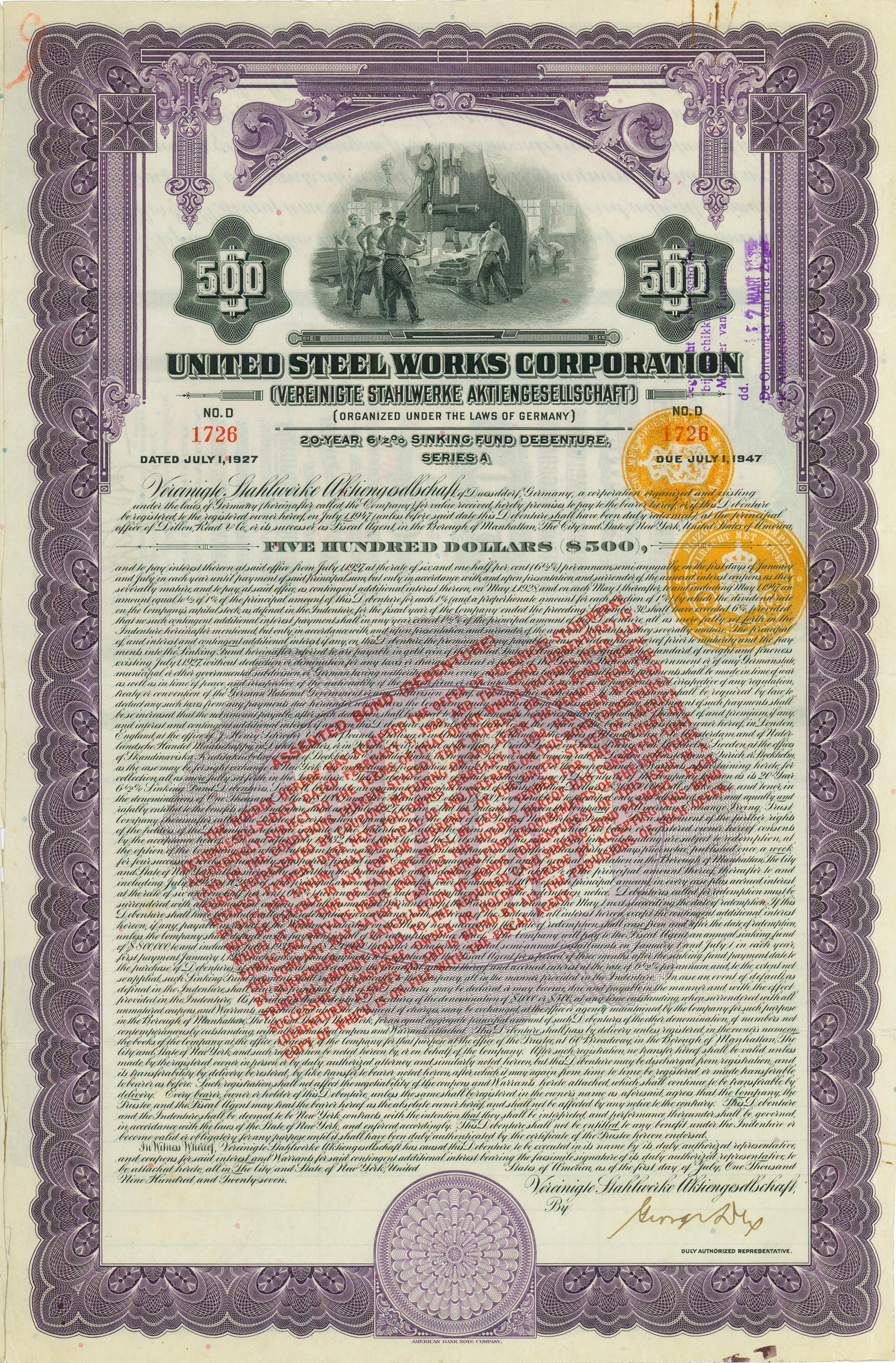
Sinking fund debenture of the United Steel Works Corp. (Vereinigte Stahlwerke), issued 1. July 1927

Founded in 1926, economic pressures (decreasing prices and excess capacities) led to the union of several companies, including Thyssen AG, Phoenix AG für Bergbau und Hüttenbetrieb, Rheinische Stahlwerke, Rhein-Elbe-Union GmbH, Deutsch-Luxemburgische Bergwerks- und Hütten-AG, Bochumer Verein, and Gelsenkirchener Bergwerks-AG. This group united of most German iron, steel and coal producers but did not include Hoesch AG, Krupp AG, Klöckner-Werke, Gutehoffnungshütte, and Mannesmann.

The company was headquartered in Düsseldorf. During the 1930s, VSt was one of the biggest German companies and, at times, also the largest steel producer in Europe. With up to about 250,000 workers, it produced about 40% of the steel and 20% of the coal produced in Germany. Chief executive officer (chief of the Vorstand) was initially Albert Vögler, until 1935. He was succeeded (1935−1943) as CEO by Ernst Poensgen, descendant of the Rhenish industrial family Poensgen and cofounder of the "Vereinigte Stahlwerke AG" in 1926. Fritz Thyssen was chairman of the board (Aufsichtsrat).

In 1932, as a result of the effects of the Great Depression, part of the company was nationalized to prevent bankruptcy. The Weimar government bought stock valued at 25 million Reichsmark (RM) for 99 million RM. This transaction like the similar Gelsenberg affair led to a public outcry. According to Heinrich Brüning the company then went on to support the Nazi party with 500,000 RM for the 1932 elections. The Nazi government re-privatized the stocks four years later so that the Vst achieved a net win of 33 million RM. The Vst became a major contributor in supplying materiel and munitions to the war effort. However, as the Vst was unable to fulfill the demands of the Nazi government, another steelworks, the Reichswerke Hermann Göring, was founded in Salzgitter.

During World War II, most of the production facilities were destroyed by bombing, and after the war, the company was dismantled. From the residuals several companies were founded in the Federal Republic of Germany after 1951, including Hörder Bergwerks- und Hütten-Verein, August Thyssen-Hütte AG, Rheinstahl, and Bochumer Verein.
