= Ferdinand Habsburg (racing driver) =

Austrian racing driver (born 1997)

Ferdinand Habsburg-Lothringen
- His Imperial and Royal Highness The; Archduke of Austria, Prince of Hungary and Bohemia
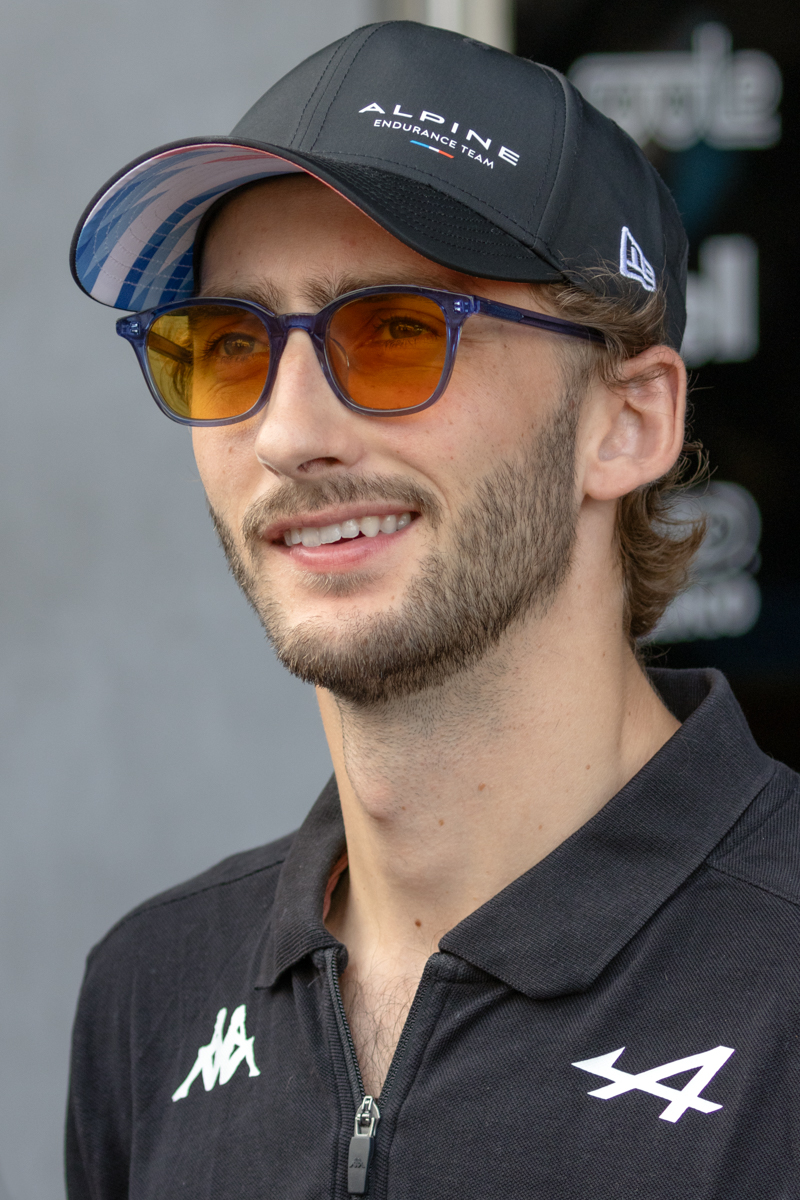
- Habsburg at the 2024 6 Hours of Fuji
- Born: Ferdinand Zvonimir Maria Balthus Keith Michael Otto Antal Bahnam Leonhard Habsburg-Lothringen; 21 June 1997 (age 29); Salzburg, Austria
- House: Habsburg-Lorraine
- Father: Karl von Habsburg
- Mother: Francesca Thyssen-Bornemisza
- Nationality: (Austria) Austrian

FIA World Endurance Championship career
- Debut season: 2021
- Current team: Alpine Endurance Team
- Categorisation: FIA Silver (2018); FIA Gold (2019–)
- Car number: 35
- Former teams: Team WRT
- Starts: 41
- Championships: 1 (2021)
- Wins: 8
- Podiums: 11
- Poles: 4
- Fastest laps: 0
- Best finish: 1st in 2021

Previous series
- 2017–18 2015–17 2016 2015–16 2015–16 2014: FIA F3 European Championship; Toyota Racing Series; Euroformula Open; Eurocup Formula Renault 2.0; Formula Renault 2.0 NEC; Formula Renault 1.6 NEC

Championship titles
- 2022 2021 2021: ELMS - LMP2; AsLMS - LMP2; WEC - LMP2

Ferdinand Habsburg-Lothringen (born Ferdinand Zvonimir Maria Balthus Keith Michael Otto Antal Bahnam Leonhard; 21 June 1997) is an Austrian motor racing driver and heir apparent to the headship of the House of Habsburg-Lorraine. He competes in the FIA World Endurance Championship with Alpine Endurance Team and in the European Le Mans Series with CLX Motorsport.

Habsburg won the 24 Hours of Le Mans and the FIA World Endurance Championship in the LMP2 class alongside Charles Milesi and Robin Frijns in 2021.

== Early life and family ==
Ferdinand Habsburg was born on 21 June 1997 to Karl von Habsburg and Francesca von Thyssen-Bornemisza. A member of the House of Habsburg, his paternal grandparents were Otto von Habsburg, the last crown prince of Austria-Hungary, and Princess Regina of Saxe-Meiningen. His maternal grandparents are Baron Hans Heinrich Thyssen-Bornemisza and Fiona Campbell-Walter, descendant of the Campbell baronets of Airds – his cousin, Jamie Campbell-Walter, is also a racing driver and doubles as Habsburg's manager.

Habsburg is a Catholic and has spoken openly about his faith. He was baptised on 20 September 1997 in Zagreb by Cardinal Franjo Kuharić. His godparents were his uncle Georg von Habsburg; Alois-Konstantin, 9th Prince of Löwenstein-Wertheim-Rosenberg; Queen Margarita of Bulgaria; and Agnes Husslein (born Countess Agnes von Arco). He was also named after king Zvonimir of Croatia.

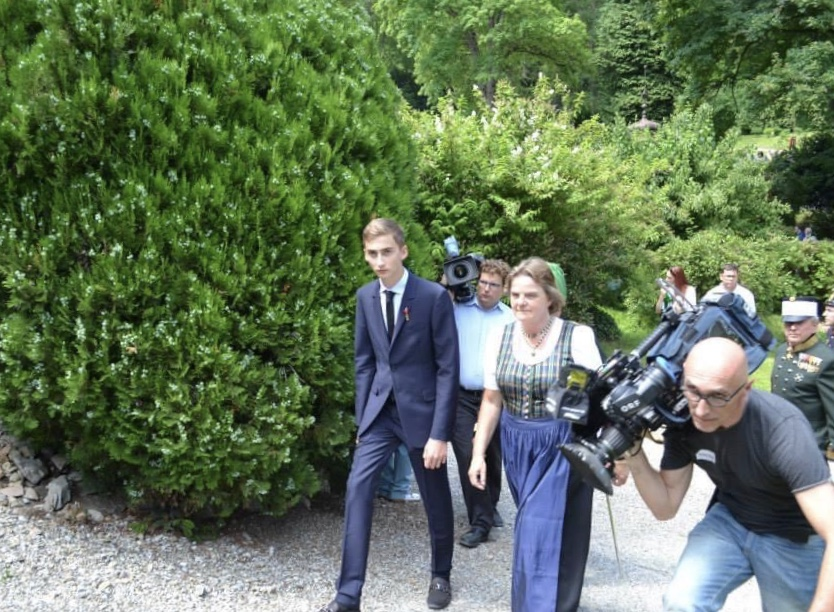
Ferdinand and his aunt, Andrea von Habsburg, in 2014

Habsburg is the brother of Eleonore von Habsburg and Gloria von Habsburg. His brother-in-law (Eleanore's husband) is former driver Jérôme d'Ambrosio.

Habsburg is the heir apparent to the headship of the House of Habsburg-Lorraine, held by his father on 1 January 2007. His titles and honorifics are unofficial as Austria is a republic with all royal titles being legally abolished in 1918.

== Early career ==
=== Karting ===
Habsburg began his racing career at the age of 14 with the Austrian team Speedworld Academy. He has worn racing number 62 since the beginning of his karting career. In 2014, after four years spent in ROTAX Junior category, winning multiple championship titles, he switched to Rotax DD2. He also qualified three times for the Rotax Max Challenge Grand Finals, scoring a best result of eleventh in 2013.

=== Formula Renault 1.6 NEC ===
In 2014, Habsburg made his début in single seaters, taking part in the Formula Renault 1.6 NEC Championship with Lechner Racing. He finished fourth with a 100% finishing rate in 15 races.

=== Toyota Racing Series ===
For 2015, Habsburg contested New Zealand's Toyota Racing Series in January and February 2015 with Victory Motor Racing, finishing 11th in the championship and fifth in the rookie class with two podium finishes. He would return to the series with Giles Motorsport for 2016 and finished fourth in the championship behind Lando Norris, Jehan Daruvala and Brendon Leitch with four podium finishes, which included his first win in car racing in the season opener at Mike Pero Motorsport Park.

Habsburg contested his final season in the series in 2017, this time driving for M2 Competition. The Austrian finished the campaign in eighth place, scoring two podiums.

=== Formula Renault 2.0 NEC ===
For 2015, Habsburg decided to switch to the Formula Renault Northern European Cup with Fortec Motorsports. Having only raced in the first five rounds in the series with a best finish of fifth at his home event at the Red Bull Ring, he ended up 19th in the standings.

=== Euroformula Open Championship ===
Habsburg made his debut in the Euroformula Open Championship in the 2015 season finale at the Circuit de Barcelona-Catalunya, where he finished both races in the top ten.

The following year, Habsburg committed to the series full-time, racing for Drivex School. Having lost ground to the more experienced title-favourite Leonardo Pulcini during the first few rounds, Habsburg was able to achieve his first race win in the series at the Circuit Paul Ricard. He followed that up by scoring seven podiums across the five remaining rounds, which included a win in Barcelona, and finished second in the standings, with twelve podiums from just 16 races to his credit.

=== FIA Formula 3 European Championship ===
==== 2017 ====
For 2017, Habsburg stepped up to the FIA European F3 Championship, racing for Carlin. He had a highly successful season, taking four podiums and a first series win at Spa. However his most impressive drive came in the end of year Macau Grand Prix. In the main race, he battled hard for the lead with Brazilian Sérgio Sette Câmara, but was unable to pass. On the final lap, Habsburg took the lead around the outside of the final corner at Fisherman's Bend, but braked too late and understeered into the barriers on the exit of the corner, with Sette Câmara doing exactly the same thing, handing the race win to Câmara's teammate Dan Ticktum. Habsburg eventually limped across the line fourth despite broken front suspension. Nonetheless, the Austrian would gain much praise from both his team boss and journalists for his final lap maneuver, along with his great season as a whole.

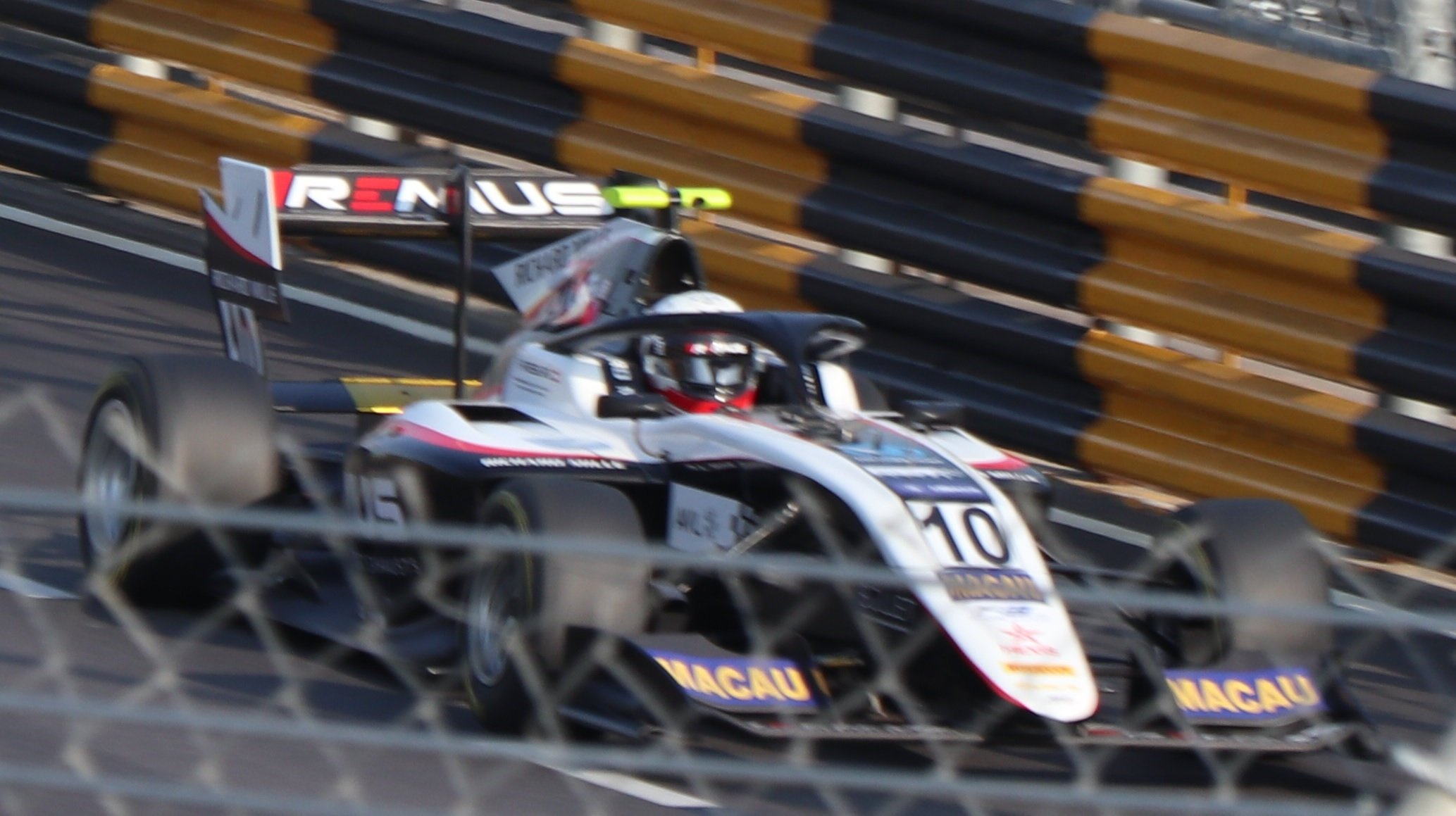
Habsburg at 2019 Macau Grand Prix

==== 2018 ====
Habsburg returned to the series in 2018 with Carlin, this time partnering Jehan Daruvala, Sacha Fenestraz, Nikita Troitskiy and Ameya Vaidyanathan. However, Habsburg was unable to find the form from the previous year, scoring just a lone podium at Misano and finishing 13th in the championship.

== Sportscar career ==
=== Deutsche Tourenwagen Masters ===
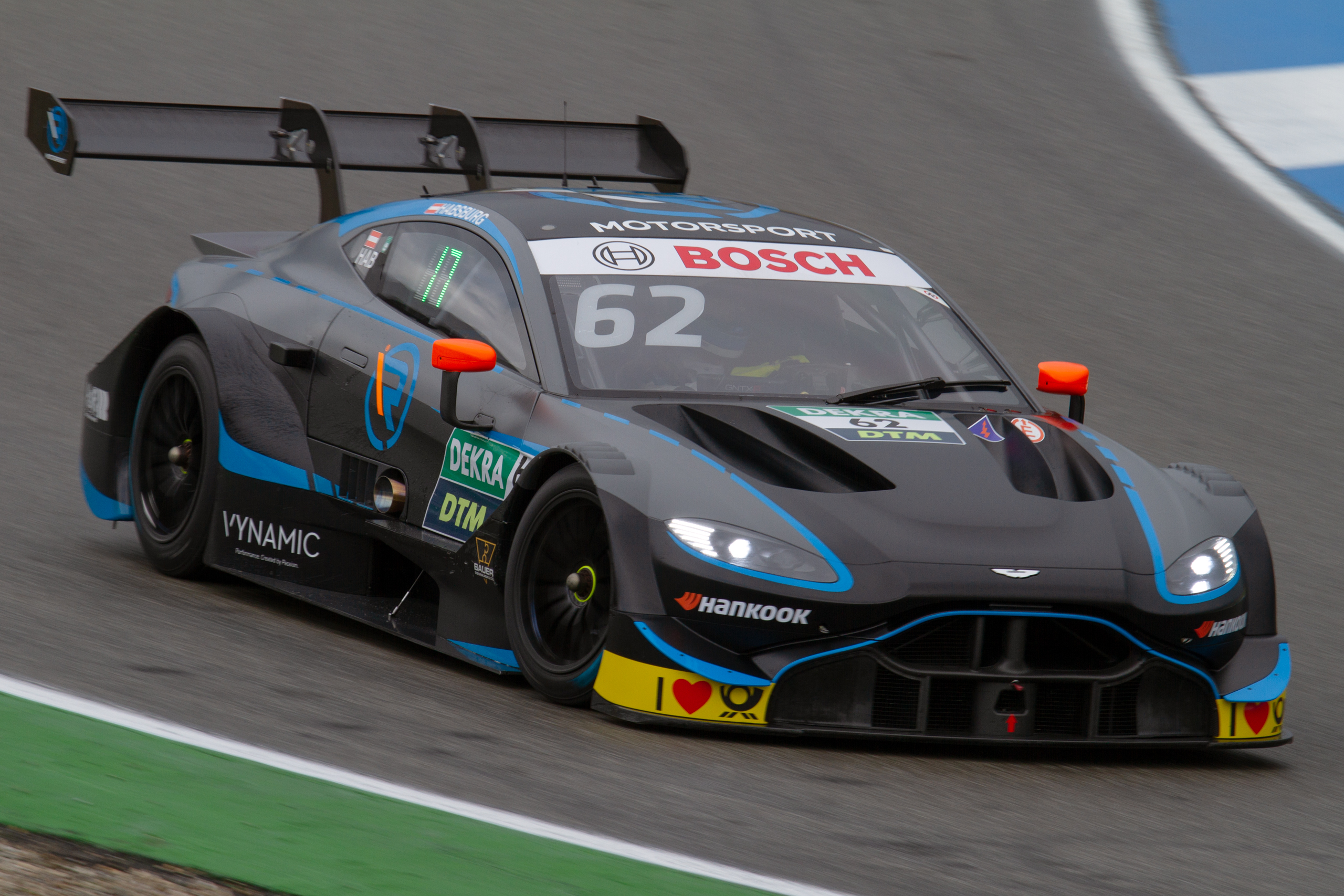
Habsburg competing for Aston Martin in the DTM

==== 2019 ====
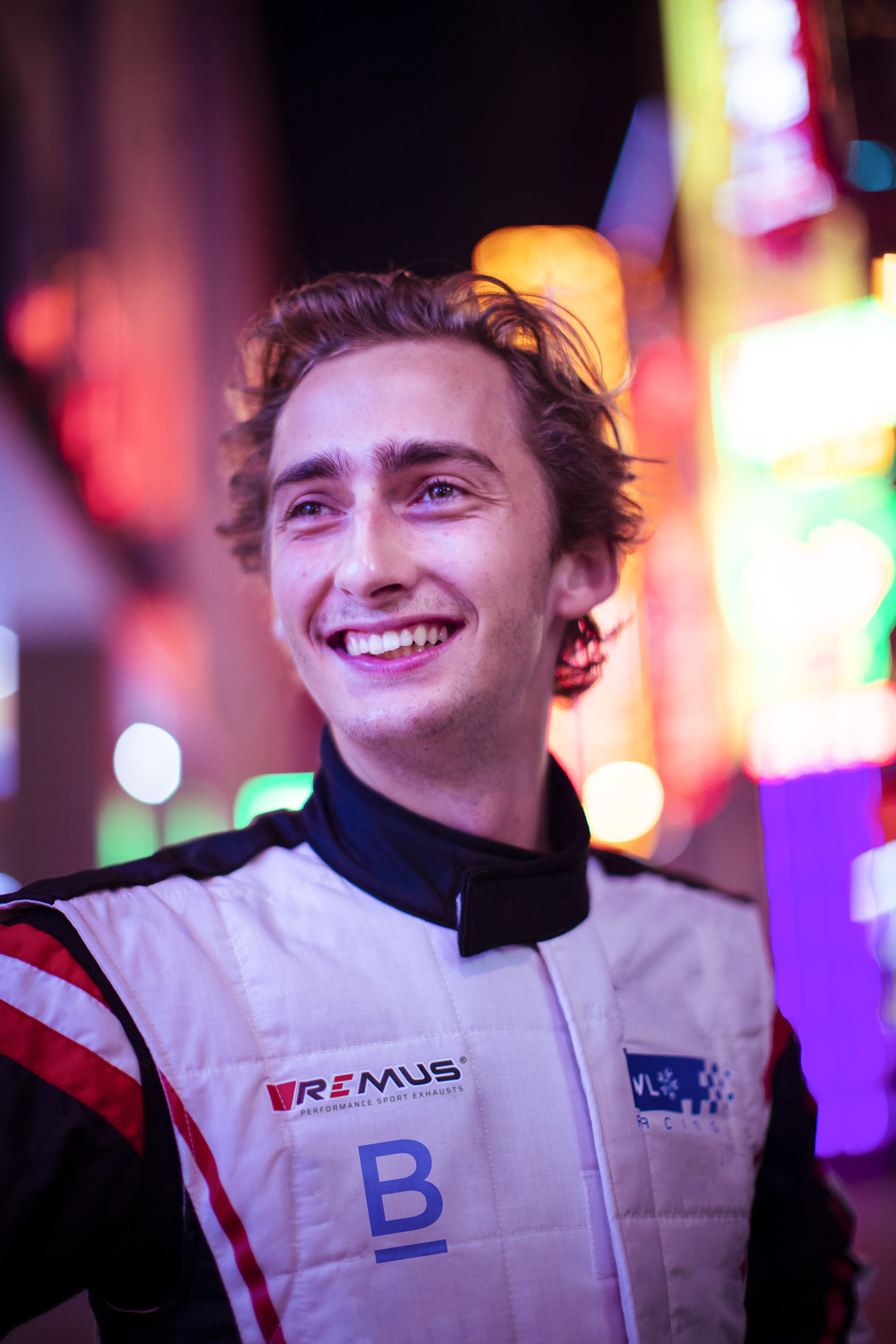
Habsburg in 2019

In 2019, Habsburg signed for R-Motorsport II to race the Aston Martin Vantage DTM in the Deutsche Tourenwagen Masters. He scored two points finishes in Circuit Zolder and the Norisring and ended up 18th in the driver's championship.

==== 2020 ====
For the 2020 season, Habsburg made the switch to Audi Sport Team WRT racing the Audi RS5 Turbo DTM. This season was comparatively successful for Habsburg as he secured ten points positions, one of which was a podium in Circuit Zolder. This meant that Habsburg finished tenth in the driver's championship with 68 points, beating both of his teammates Fabio Scherer and Harrison Newey.

=== eSports ===
==== 2020 ====
In 2020, Habsburg competed in the 24 Hours of Le Mans Virtual with Mahle Racing, driving the 2018 Aston Martin Vantage GTE alongside former IndyCar Series driver Robert Wickens and sim-racers Jimmy Broadbent and Kevin Rotting. They classified in 46th place.

=== Endurance racing ===
==== 2021 ====
Habsburg started his 2021 campaign by racing in the Asian Le Mans Series with G-Drive Racing. Together with his teammates Yifei Ye and Rene Binder he won the drivers' championship, taking two wins along the way. Alongside this, Habsburg raced with High Class Racing in the 2021 24 Hours of Daytona alongside Robert Kubica, Dennis Andersen, and Anders Fjordbach. However, they retired from the race due to a gearbox failure.

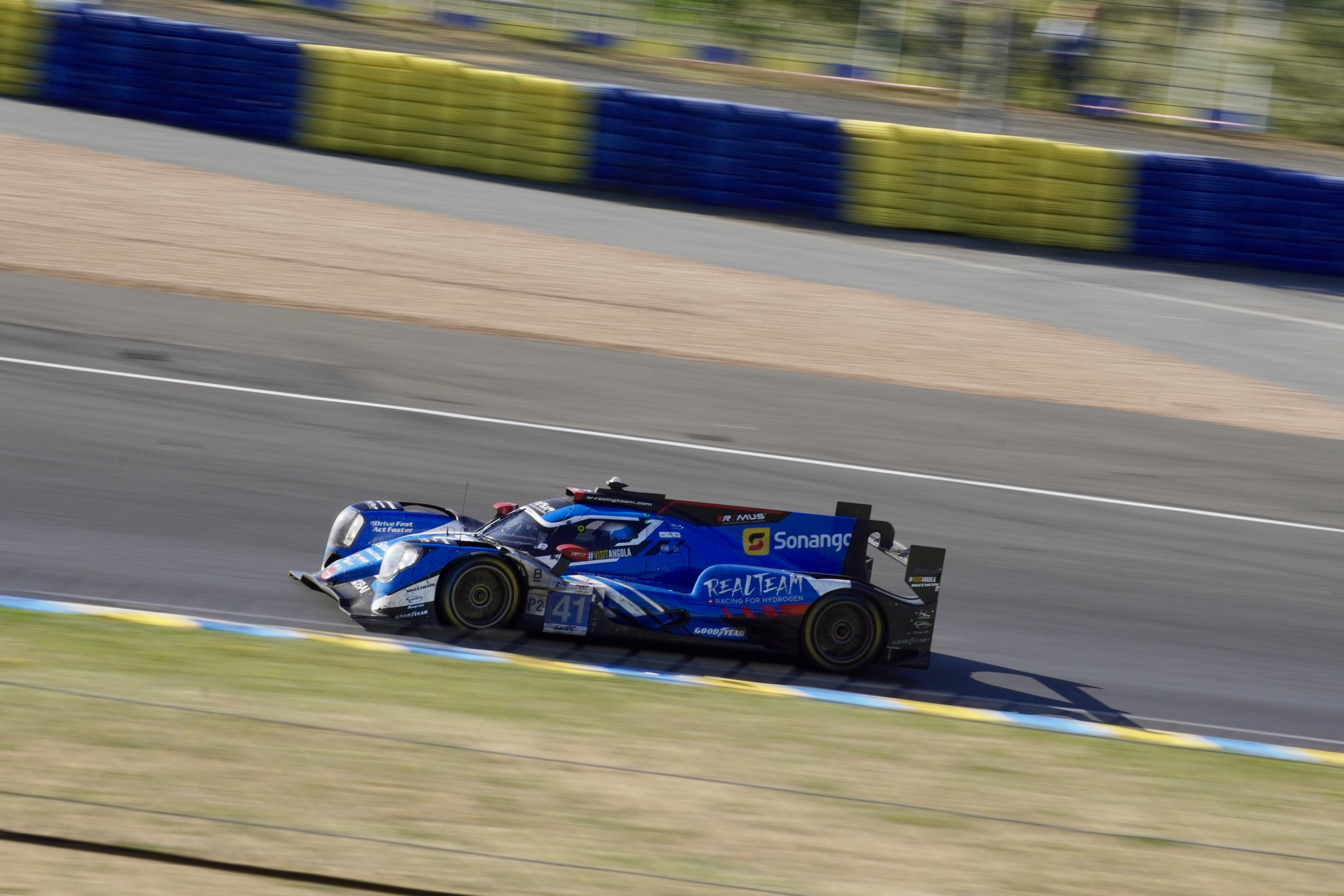
The #41 Oreca 07 at the 2022 24 Hours of Le Mans driven by Habsburg, Rui Andrade and Norman Nato

On 26 February, it was confirmed Habsburg would compete in the FIA World Endurance Championship for Team WRT alongside Robin Frijns and Charles Milesi, driving an Oreca 07 in the LMP2 class. During the first round in the 6 Hours of Spa-Francorchamps, Habsburg and his team finished tenth and in the following race, the 8 Hours of Portimão, his team finished in fourth position. However, it was in the next race, the 6 Hours of Monza that Habsburg clinched his first LMP2 podium, finishing in second place. In round four, that being the 24 Hours of Le Mans, Habsburg and his Team WRT teammates clinched a dramatic LMP2 class win after their sister Team WRT car suffered a throttle Sensor failure on the final lap whilst in the lead of the race. After a two-month long break the trio won the 6 Hours of Bahrain. The following weekend, Habsburg, Frijns and Milesi clinched the LMP2 title after scoring a third consecutive victory in the series at the 8-hour race at the same venue. Habsburg also became the first Austrian to win the LMP2 title in the World Endurance Championship.

==== 2022 ====
The following year, Habsburg returned to the WEC, driving the No. 41 car for RealTeam by WRT with Rui Andrade and Norman Nato. Together, the team achieved three podiums, which included a win at the 6 Hours of Monza, and finished fourth in the standings.

Parallel to his WEC campaign, Habsburg competed for Prema Racing in the European Le Mans Series. The team started the season in controlling fashion, winning the season opener at Paul Ricard, after which Habsburg described himself as "honoured", and taking victory in Imola despite Lorenzo Colombo having to serve two drive-through penalties for a pair of separate infringements. After a fifth place in Monza, Habsburg and his teammates Colombo and Louis Delétraz took yet another victory at Barcelona to extend their championship advantage. Another podium came in the penultimate race at Spa, before the team clinched the title with a victory at the finale in Portimão, meaning that Habsburg and Delétraz claimed the ELMS drivers' title.

==== 2023 ====
Habsburg remained with Team WRT for the 2023 WEC season, this time partnering Sean Gelael and reuniting with Robin Frijns. The trio ended up fourth in the standings, with bad luck costing them three important results: having lost out on a podium at Le Mans due to a suspension problem, the team was forced to retire from the lead at Monza due to an engine failure, while a wheel gun issue at the final pit stop dropped the team from first to second in Bahrain.

==== 2024 ====
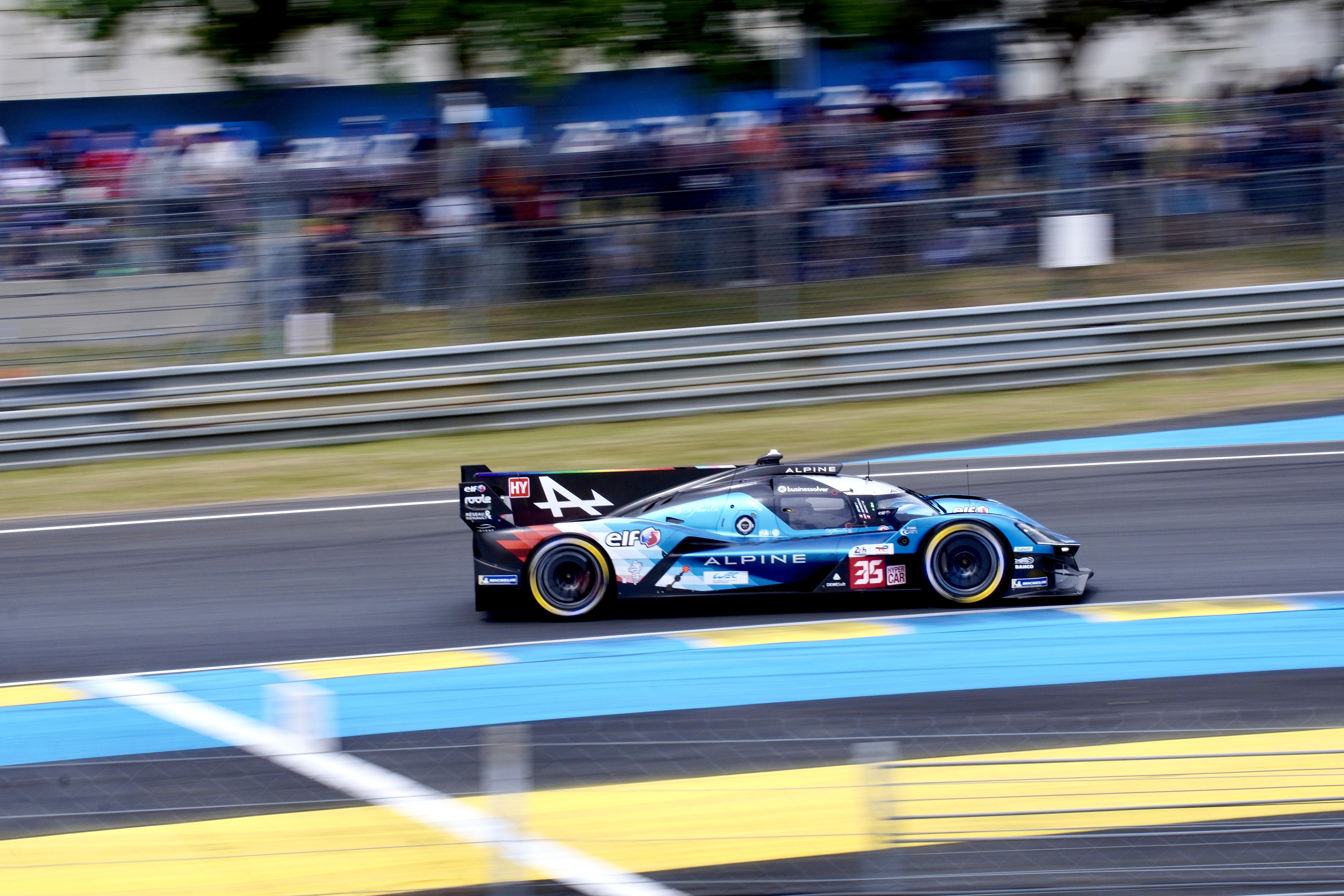
The #35 Alpine A424 at the 2024 24 Hours of Le Mans

For the 2024 season, Habsburg stepped up to the top class in the WEC, joining the Alpine Endurance Team to drive an Alpine A424. Habsburg competed in the first round, the Qatar 1812 km, finishing eighth. He would be injured in a crash during testing at MotorLand Aragón on 27 March, fracturing two lumbar vertebrae, missing the next two rounds at Imola and Spa; Alpine reserve driver Jules Gounon would stand in for him. He would return to the car for the 24 Hours of Le Mans.

== Karting record ==
=== Karting career summary ===
Season	Series	Team	Position
2011	Rotax Max Challenge Central-Eastern Europe — Junior		6th
2011	Rotax Euro Challenge — Junior		75th
2012	Rotax Euro Challenge — Junior		79th
2012	Rotax Max Challenge Grand Finals — Junior	Kalman Motorsport	35th
2013	Rotax Max Challenge Central-Eastern Europe — Junior		2nd
2013	Rotax Max Challenge Grand Finals — Junior	Speedworld Academy	11th
2014	Rotax Max Challenge Grand Finals — DD2	Speedworld Academy	12th
2019	Deutsche Elektro-Kart-Meisterschaft (DEKM)		NC

== Racing record ==
=== Career summary ===
Season	Series	Team	Races	Wins	Poles	F/Laps	Podiums	Points	Position
2014	Formula Renault 1.6 NEC	Lechner Racing	15	0	0	0	4	213	4th
2015	Formula Renault 2.0 NEC	Fortec Motorsports	11	0	0	0	0	62	18th
2015	Eurocup Formula Renault 2.0	Fortec Motorsports	5	0	0	0	0	0	NC†
2015	Formula Renault 2.0 Alps	Fortec Motorsports	3	0	0	0	0	0	NC†
2015	Euroformula Open Championship	Drivex School	2	0	0	0	0	0	NC†
2015	Toyota Racing Series	Victory Motor Racing	16	0	1	1	2	490	11th
2016	Euroformula Open Championship	Drivex School	16	2	4	1	12	247	**2nd**
2016	Spanish Formula 3 Championship	Drivex School	6	1	1	0	4	90	**3rd**
2016	Eurocup Formula Renault 2.0	Fortec Motorsports	15	0	1	0	2	57	10th
2016	Formula Renault 2.0 NEC	Fortec Motorsports	10	0	0	0	2	130	11th
2016	Macau Grand Prix	Fortec Motorsports	1	0	0	0	0	N/A	DNF
2016	Toyota Racing Series	Giles Motorsport	15	2	0	1	4	727	4th
2017	FIA Formula 3 European Championship	Carlin	30	1	0	2	4	187	7th
2017	Macau Grand Prix	Carlin	1	0	0	0	0	N/A	4th
2017	Toyota Racing Series	M2 Competition	15	0	0	0	2	568	8th
2018	FIA Formula 3 European Championship	Carlin	30	0	0	2	1	87	13th
2018	International GT Open	Drivex School	2	0	0	0	0	1	44th
2018	IMSA SportsCar Championship - Prototype	Jackie Chan DCR Jota	1	0	0	0	0	26	51st
2018	Macau Grand Prix	Motopark	1	0	0	0	0	N/A	10th
2019	Deutsche Tourenwagen Masters	R-Motorsport II	17	0	0	0	0	3	18th
2019	Blancpain GT Series Endurance Cup	R-Motorsport	1	0	0	0	0	0	NC
2019	Macau Grand Prix	ART Grand Prix	1	0	0	0	0	N/A	DNF
2020	Deutsche Tourenwagen Masters	Audi Sport Team WRT	17	0	1	0	1	68	10th
2020	GT World Challenge Europe Endurance Cup	Audi Sport Team WRT	1	0	0	0	0	0	NC
2020	Intercontinental GT Challenge	Audi Sport Team WRT	1	0	0	0	0	0	NC
2021	FIA World Endurance Championship - LMP2	Team WRT	6	3	1	0	4	151	**1st**
2021	24 Hours of Le Mans - LMP2	Team WRT	1	1	0	0	1	N/A	**1st**
2021	European Le Mans Series - LMP2	Algarve Pro Racing	6	0	0	0	1	27.5	13th
2021	Asian Le Mans Series - LMP2	G-Drive Racing	4	2	0	1	3	81	**1st**
2021	IMSA SportsCar Championship - LMP2	High Class Racing	1	0	0	0	0	0	NC‡
2022	FIA World Endurance Championship - LMP2	RealTeam by WRT	6	1	1	0	3	96	4th
2022	24 Hours of Le Mans - LMP2	RealTeam by WRT	1	0	0	0	0	N/A	17th
2022	IMSA SportsCar Championship - LMP2	Tower Motorsport	1	0	0	0	1	0	NC‡
2022	European Le Mans Series - LMP2	Prema Racing	6	4	0	1	5	125	**1st**
2023	FIA World Endurance Championship - LMP2	Team WRT	7	0	0	0	2	94	4th
2023	24 Hours of Le Mans - LMP2	Team WRT	1	0	0	1	0	N/A	5th
2023-24	Asian Le Mans Series - LMP2	Nielsen Racing	4	0	0	0	0	10	13th
2024	FIA World Endurance Championship - Hypercar	Alpine Endurance Team	6	0	0	0	0	43	11th
2024	European Le Mans Series - LMP2	Cool Racing	4	0	0	0	1	16	20th
2024	IMSA SportsCar Championship - LMP2	Tower Motorsports	1	0	0	0	0	278	44th
2025	FIA World Endurance Championship - Hypercar	Alpine Endurance Team	8	1	0	0	1	37	14th
2025	European Le Mans Series - LMP2	Nielsen Racing	6	0	1	0	1	46	5th
2026	IMSA SportsCar Championship - LMP2	Era Motorsport	5	0	0	1	2	1420	20th
2026	FIA World Endurance Championship - Hypercar	Alpine Endurance Team	8	0	0	0	1	57	12th
2026	European Le Mans Series - LMP2	CLX Motorsport	5	0	0	0	1	38	9th
2026-27	Asian Le Mans Series - LMP2	Proton Competition							

† As von Habsburg was a guest driver, he was ineligible to score championship points.
^{‡} Points only counted towards the Michelin Endurance Cup, and not the overall LMP2 Championship.

=== Complete Formula Renault 1.6 NEC results ===
(key) (Races in bold indicate pole position) (Races in italics indicate fastest lap)

Year	Team	1	2	3	4	5	6	7	8	9	10	11	12	13	14	15	DC	Points
2014	Lechner Racing School	ZAN1; 1; 6	ZAN1; 2; 2	SPA1; 1; 18	SPA1; 2; 6	NÜR; 1; 5	NÜR; 2; 6	ASS; 1; 3	ASS; 2; 6	ZOL; 1; 6	ZOL; 2; 7	SPA2; 1; 4	SPA2; 2; 5	ZAN2; 1; 2	ZAN2; 2; 2	ZAN2; 3; 9	4th	213

=== Complete Toyota Racing Series results ===
(key) (Races in bold indicate pole position) (Races in italics indicate fastest lap)

Year	Team	1	2	3	4	5	6	7	8	9	10	11	12	13	14	15	16	DC	Points
2015	Victory Motor Racing	RUA; 1; 6	RUA; 2; 3	RUA; 3 Ret	TER; 1; 7	TER; 2; 6	TER; 3; 12	HMP; 1; 10	HMP; 2; 2	HMP; 3; 11	TAU; 1; 15	TAU; 2; 16	TAU; 3; 16	TAU; 4; 14	MAN; 1; 11	MAN; 2; 14	MAN; 3 Ret	12th	490
2016	Giles Motorsport	RUA; 1; 1	RUA; 2; 7	RUA; 3; 2	TER; 1; 13	TER; 2; 8	TER; 3; 4	HMP; 1; 6	HMP; 2; 9	HMP; 3; 8	TAU; 1; 6	TAU; 2; 12	TAU; 3; 4	MAU; 1; 1	MAU; 2; 7	MAU; 3; 3		4th	727
2017	M2 Competition	RUA; 1; 7	RUA; 2; 5	RUA; 3; 6	TER; 1; 4	TER; 2 Ret	TER; 3; 18	HMP; 1; 9	HMP; 2; 10	HMP; 3; 2	TAU; 1; 18	TAU; 2; 16	TAU; 3; 3	MAN; 1; 8	MAN; 2; 5	MAN; 3; 7		8th	552

=== Complete Eurocup Formula Renault 2.0 results ===
(key) (Races in bold indicate pole position) (Races in italics indicate fastest lap)

Year	Team	1	2	3	4	5	6	7	8	9	10	11	12	13	14	15	16	17	Pos	Points
2015	Fortec Motorsports	ALC; 1	ALC; 2	ALC; 3	SPA; 1; 26†	SPA; 2; 17	HUN; 1	HUN; 2	SIL; 1 Ret	SIL; 2 DNS	SIL; 3 DNS	NÜR; 1; 18	NÜR; 2; 23	LMS; 1	LMS; 2	JER; 1	JER; 2	JER; 3	NC†	0
2016	Fortec Motorsports	ALC; 1; 10	ALC; 2; 7	ALC; 3; 12	MON; 1; 2	MNZ; 1 Ret	MNZ; 2; 10	MNZ; 3; 12	RBR; 1; 3	RBR; 2; 8	LEC; 1; 8	LEC; 2; 6	SPA; 1; 7	SPA; 2; 11	EST; 1 Ret	EST; 2; 12			10th	57

^{†} As Habsburg was a guest driver, he was ineligible for points.

=== Complete Formula Renault 2.0 NEC results ===
(key) (Races in bold indicate pole position) (Races in italics indicate fastest lap)

Year	Team	1	2	3	4	5	6	7	8	9	10	11	12	13	14	15	16	DC	Points
2015	Fortec Motorsports	MNZ; 1; 25	MNZ; 2 Ret	SIL; 1; 18	SIL; 2; 16	RBR; 1; 6	RBR; 2; 16	RBR; 3; 5	SPA; 1 Ret	SPA; 2; 23	ASS; 1; 13	ASS; 2; 11	NÜR; 1	NÜR; 2	HOC; 1	HOC; 2	HOC; 3	19th	62
2016	Fortec Motorsports	MNZ; 1	MNZ; 2	SIL; 1; 4	SIL; 2; 10	HUN; 1; 3	HUN; 2; 3	SPA; 1; 12	SPA; 2; 7	ASS; 1; 6	ASS; 2; 8	NÜR; 1; 10	NÜR; 2 Ret	HOC; 1	HOC; 2	HOC; 3		11th	130

=== Complete Euroformula Open Championship results ===
(key) (Races in bold indicate pole position; races in italics indicate points for the fastest lap of top ten finishers)

Year	Entrant	1	2	3	4	5	6	7	8	9	10	11	12	13	14	15	16	DC	Points
2015	Drivex School	JER; 1	JER; 2	LEC; 1	LEC; 2	EST; 1	EST; 2	SIL; 1	SIL; 2	RBR; 1	RBR; 2	SPA; 1	SPA; 2	MNZ; 1	MNZ; 2	CAT; 1; 10	CAT; 2; 4	NC†	0
2016	Drivex School	EST; 1; 2	EST; 2; 9	SPA; 1; 3	SPA; 2; 3	**LEC**; **1**; 1	**LEC**; **2**; 2	SIL; 1; 4	SIL; 2; 2	RBR; 1; 2	RBR; 2 Ret	MNZ; 1; 3	MNZ; 2; 2	JER; 1; 7	**JER**; **2**; 2	CAT; 1; 1	**CAT**; **2**; 2	2nd	247

† As von Habsburg was a guest driver, he was ineligible to score championship points.

=== Complete Macau Grand Prix results ===
Year	Team	Car	Qualifying	Quali Race	Main race
2016	(United Kingdom) Fortec Motorsport	Dallara F312	23rd	17th	DNF
2017	(United Kingdom) Carlin	Dallara F317	5th	5th	4th
2018	(Germany) Motopark	Dallara F317	15th	13th	10th
2019	(France) ART Grand Prix	Dallara F3 2019	11th	8th	DNF

=== Complete FIA Formula 3 European Championship results ===
(key) (Races in bold indicate pole position) (Races in italics indicate fastest lap)

Year	Entrant	Engine	1	2	3	4	5	6	7	8	9	10	11	12	13	14	15	16	17	18	19	20	21	22	23	24	25	26	27	28	29	30	DC	Points
2017	Carlin	Volkswagen	SIL; 1; 12	SIL; 2; 13	SIL; 3; 12	MNZ; 1; 3	MNZ; 2; 5	MNZ; 3; 5	PAU; 1; 8	PAU; 2; 8	PAU; 3; 6	HUN; 1; 15	HUN; 2; 10	HUN; 3; 12	NOR; 1 Ret	NOR; 2; 15	NOR; 3; 8	SPA; 1; 8	SPA; 2; 1	SPA; 3; 6	ZAN; 1; 4	ZAN; 2; 6	ZAN; 3; 2	NÜR; 1; 5	NÜR; 2; 6	NÜR; 3 Ret	RBR; 1; 6	RBR; 2; 9	RBR; 3; 4	HOC; 1; 3	HOC; 2; 20	HOC; 3 Ret	7th	187
2018	Carlin	Volkswagen	PAU; 1; 11	PAU; 2; 11	PAU; 3 Ret	HUN; 1 Ret	HUN; 2; 8	HUN; 3; 15	NOR; 1; 18	NOR; 2; 5	NOR; 3; 9	ZAN; 1; 14	ZAN; 2; 5	ZAN; 3; 7	SPA; 1 Ret	SPA; 2; 10	SPA; 3; 12	SIL; 1; 13	SIL; 2; 13	SIL; 3; 9	MIS; 1; 12	MIS; 2; 7	MIS; 3; 3	NÜR; 1 Ret	NÜR; 2; 10	NÜR; 3; 11	RBR; 1; 5	RBR; 2; 8	RBR; 3; 6	HOC; 1 Ret	HOC; 2; 12	HOC; 3; 6	13th	87

=== Complete IMSA SportsCar Championship results ===
(key) (Races in bold indicate pole position; races in italics indicate fastest lap)

Year	Entrant	Class	Make	Engine	1	2	3	4	5	6	7	8	9	10	Rank	Points
2018	Jackie Chan DCR JOTA	P	Oreca 07	Gibson GK428 4.2 L V8	DAY; 5	SEB	LBH	MDO	DET	WGL	MOS	ELK	LGA	PET	51st	26
2021	High Class Racing	LMP2	Oreca 07	Gibson GK428 4.2 L V8	DAY; 9†	SEB	WGL	WGL	ELK	LGA	PET				NC†	0
2022	Tower Motorsport	LMP2	Oreca 07	Gibson GK428 4.2 L V8	DAY; 3†	SEB	LGA	MDO	WGL	ELK	PET				NC†	0
2024	Tower Motorsports	LMP2	Oreca 07	Gibson GK428 4.2 L V8	DAY; 5	SEB	WGL	MOS	ELK	IMS	PET				44th	278
2026	Era Motorsport	LMP2	Oreca 07	Gibson GK428 4.2 L V8	DAY; 9	SEB; 4	WGL; 3	MOS	ELK; 10	IMS	PET; 3				20th	1420

^{†} Points only counted towards the Michelin Endurance Cup, and not the overall LMP2 Championship.

=== Complete Deutsche Tourenwagen Masters results ===
(key) (Races in bold indicate pole position) (Races in italics indicate fastest lap)

Year	Entrant	Car	1	2	3	4	5	6	7	8	9	10	11	12	13	14	15	16	17	18	DC	Points
2019	R-Motorsport II	Aston Martin Vantage DTM	HOC; 1 Ret	HOC; 2; 13	ZOL; 1; 9	ZOL; 2 Ret	MIS; 1; 14	MIS; 2; 12	NOR; 1; 10	NOR; 2; 11	ASS; 1; 13	ASS; 2; 12	BRH; 1; 15†	BRH; 2; 11	LAU; 1; 15	LAU; 2 Ret	NÜR; 1; 11	NÜR; 2; 15	HOC; 1 DNS	HOC; 2; 11	18th	3
2020	Audi Sport Team WRT	Audi RS5 Turbo DTM	SPA; 1 DNS	SPA; 2; 15	LAU; 1; 6	LAU; 2; 10	LAU; 1; 11	LAU; 2; 14	ASS; 1; 8	ASS; 2; 7	NÜR; 1; 11	NÜR; 2; 15	NÜR; 1; 7	NÜR; 2; 6	ZOL; 1; 7	ZOL; 2; 7	ZOL; 1; 3	**ZOL**; **2**; 10	HOC; 1; 11	HOC; 2; 14	10th	68

^{†} Driver did not finish, but was classified as he completed 90% of the race distance.

=== Complete Asian Le Mans Series results ===
(key) (Races in bold indicate pole position) (Races in italics indicate fastest lap)

Year	Team	Class	Car	Engine	1	2	3	4	5	6	Pos.	Points
2021	G-Drive Racing	LMP2	Aurus 01	Gibson GK428 4.2 L V8	DUB; 1; 1	DUB; 2; 1	ABU; 1; 2	**ABU**; **2**; 4			1st	81
2023–24	Nielsen Racing	LMP2	Oreca 07	Gibson GK428 4.2 L V8	SEP; 1; 9	SEP; 2 Ret	DUB; 1	ABU; 1; 9	ABU; 2; 7		13th	10
2026–27	Proton Competition	LMP2	Oreca 07	Gibson GK428 4.2 L V8	LEC; 1; 13	LEC; 2; 7	JER; 1	JER; 2	ALG; 1	ALG; 2	10th*	6*

=== Complete European Le Mans Series results ===
(key) (Races in bold indicate pole position; results in italics indicate fastest lap)

Year	Entrant	Class	Chassis	Engine	1	2	3	4	5	6	Rank	Points
2021	Algarve Pro Racing	LMP2	Oreca 07	Gibson GK428 4.2 L V8	CAT; 11	RBR; 8	LEC; 7	MNZ; 10	SPA; Ret	ALG; 3	13th	27.5
2022	Prema Racing	LMP2	Oreca 07	Gibson GK428 4.2 L V8	LEC; 1	IMO; 1	MNZ; 5	CAT; 1	SPA; 3	ALG; 1	1st	125
2024	Cool Racing	LMP2	Oreca 07	Gibson GK428 4.2 L V8	CAT	LEC	IMO; 10	SPA; 11	MUG; 13	ALG; 3	20th	16
2025	Nielsen Racing	LMP2	Oreca 07	Gibson GK428 4.2 L V8	CAT; 7	LEC; 5	IMO; 7	**SPA**; 3	SIL; 6	ALG; Ret	5th	46
2026	CLX Motorsport	LMP2 Pro-Am	Oreca 07	Gibson GK428 4.2 L V8	CAT	LEC; 9	IMO; 6	SPA; 11	SIL; 5	ALG; 2	9th	38

=== Complete FIA World Endurance Championship results ===
(key) (Races in bold indicate pole position) (Races in italics indicate fastest lap)

Year	Entrant	Class	Chassis	Engine	1	2	3	4	5	6	7	8	Rank	Points
2021	Team WRT	LMP2	Oreca 07	Gibson GK428 4.2 L V8	SPA; 10	ALG; 4	MNZ; 2	**LMS**; 1	BHR; 1	BHR; 1			1st	151
2022	RealTeam by WRT	LMP2	Oreca 07	Gibson GK428 4.2 L V8	SEB; 3	SPA; 2	LMS; 10	MNZ; 1	FUJ; 4	**BHR**; 5			4th	96
2023	Team WRT	LMP2	Oreca 07	Gibson GK428 4.2 L V8	SEB; 6	ALG; 6	SPA; 6	LMS; 4	MNZ; Ret	FUJ; 3	BHR; 2		4th	94
2024	Alpine Endurance Team	Hypercar	Alpine A424	Alpine V634 3.4 L Turbo V6	QAT; 7	IMO	SPA	LMS; Ret	SÃO; 12	COA; 5	FUJ; 7	BHR; 4	11th	43
2025	Alpine Endurance Team	Hypercar	Alpine A424	Alpine V634 3.4 L Turbo V6	QAT; 14	IMO; 13	SPA; 8	LMS; 8	SÃO; 18	COA; 11	FUJ; 1	BHR; 11	14th	37
2026	Alpine Endurance Team	Hypercar	Alpine A424	Alpine V634 3.4 L Turbo V6	IMO; 4	SPA; 12	LMS; 6	SÃO; 10	COA; 3	FUJ; 4	CAT; 10	MNZ; Ret	12th	57

=== Complete 24 Hours of Le Mans results ===
Year	Team	Co-Drivers	Car	Class	Laps	Pos.	Class Pos.
2021	(Belgium) Team WRT	(France) Charles Milesi (Netherlands) Robin Frijns	Oreca 07-Gibson	LMP2	363	6th	**1st**
2022	(Switzerland) RealTeam by WRT	(Angola) Rui Andrade (France) Norman Nato	Oreca 07-Gibson	LMP2	362	21st	17th
2023	(Belgium) Team WRT	(Netherlands) Robin Frijns (Indonesia) Sean Gelael	Oreca 07-Gibson	LMP2	327	13th	5th
2024	(France) Alpine Endurance Team	(France) Paul-Loup Chatin (France) Charles Milesi	Alpine A424	Hypercar	75	DNF	DNF
2025	(France) Alpine Endurance Team	(France) Paul-Loup Chatin (France) Charles Milesi	Alpine A424	Hypercar	385	9th	9th
2026	(France) Alpine Endurance Team	(Portugal) António Félix da Costa (France) Charles Milesi	Alpine A424	Hypercar	381	6th	6th

== Dynastic activities ==
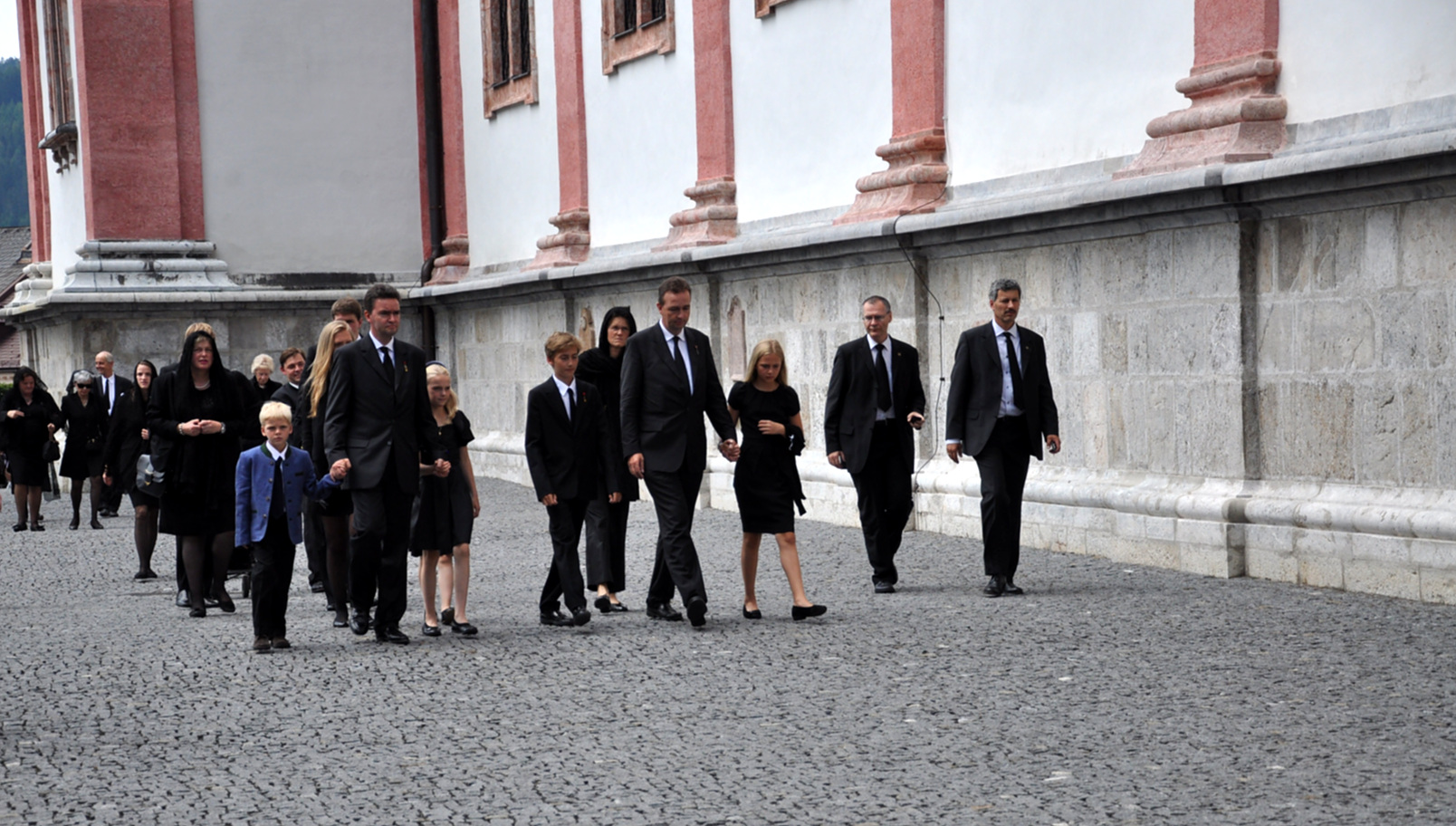
Ferdinand attended the requiem for Otto von Habsburg

In 2011, Ferdinand attended the Requiem Mass in Vienna's St. Stephen's Cathedral of his grandfather, Otto von Habsburg, former head of the House of Habsburg, former Crown Prince and by pretense, Emperor-King of Austria-Hungary.

On 28 June 2014, Austrian royal family members including Ferdinand and more than 120 direct descendants of Archduke Franz Ferdinand gathered in Lower Austria to mark the 100th anniversary of his death. The ceremony took place at Artstetten Castle, the royal family's former summer home, where his remains rest.

On 5 May 2016, he was installed as a knight in the Order of St. George. The heir to the house of Austria received the knighthood from his father, Archduke Karl, Grand Master. The history of the order goes back many centuries, created by Rudolph, Count of Habsburg who reigned as Emperor of the Holy Roman Empire from 1273 to 1291.

In 2022, Ferdinand with his family observed the 100th anniversary of the death of Charles I of Austria.

== Honours ==
=== Dynastic ===
- (Austria-Hungary) House of Habsburg-Lorraine:
  - Knight of the Order of the Golden Fleece
  - Knight of the Order of Saint George

=== National ===
- Austria:
  - Military Service Medal in bronze

Sporting positions
Preceded by Roman Rusinov; James French; Leonard Hoogenboom	Asian Le Mans Series; LMP2 Champion; 2021; With: René Binder & Yifei Ye	Succeeded by Ben Hanley; Matt Bell; Rodrigo Sales
Preceded by Filipe Albuquerque; Phil Hanson	FIA Endurance Trophy for LMP2 Drivers; 2021; With: Robin Frijns & Charles Milesi	Succeeded by António Félix da Costa; Will Stevens; Roberto González
Preceded by Robert Kubica; Louis Delétraz; Yifei Ye	European Le Mans Series; LMP2 Champion; 2022; With: Louis Delétraz	Succeeded by Alex Lynn; Kyffin Simpson; James Allen
