= Ocean Space =

Exhibition venue and research center

Ocean Space is an exhibition and research centre located in the deconsecrated Church of San Lorenzo in the Castello district of Venice, Italy. It is operated by TBA21–Academy, the research arm of the art foundation TBA21 Thyssen‑Bornemisza Art Contemporary.

== History ==
Restoration efforts at the Church of San Lorenzo began in 2016, coordinated by Francesca Thyssen‑Bornemisza through TBA21. The venue opened to the public in March 2019 with Moving Off the Land II, an exhibition by Joan Jonas.

In 2019, TBA21 and the Comune di Venezia received a mention at the XXXV Premio Pietro Torta, awarded by the Ateneo Veneto, which recognizes organizations involved in the conservation and restoration of historical sites in Venice.

In 2025, Ocean Space received the Flash Art Italia Award in the “Innovation and Sustainability” category.

== Exhibition program ==
Ocean Space hosts a seasonal exhibition programme, typically active from spring through autumn. Exhibitions have included projects by artists and architects such as Dineo Seshee Bopape, Diana Policarpo, Simone Fattal, Petrit Halilaj and Álvaro Urbano. Some projects were developed through The Current, a curatorial fellowship supported by TBA21–Academy. Curators have included Stefanie Hessler, Ute Meta Bauer, Chus Martínez, Barbara Casavecchia, Daniela Zyman, Taloi Havini, and Yina Jiménez Suriel.

== Public programmes and education ==
The venue also organises public events such as talks, performances, and panel discussions. Participants have included Olafur Eliasson, Kim Stanley Robinson, Benjamin Bratton, and Kate Crawford.

Ocean Space runs educational initiatives focused on ocean-related topics, including programmes titled Ocean Schools, Ocean Families, and Ocean for All. In 2023, the project Abecedarium: the Ocean in Sign Language, developed with the Italian National Agency for the Deaf (ENS) and the Institute of Marine Sciences (CNR-ISMAR)), was shortlisted for the Art Explora – Académie des Beaux-Arts European Award.
