= Arthur John Warren =

British philatelist (1847–1930)

- Born: June 19, 1847
- Died: August 29, 1930 (aged 83)
- Occupation: Philatelist

Arthur John Warren (19 June 1847 – 29 August 1930) was a British philatelist who was appointed to the Roll of Distinguished Philatelists in 1921.

He was the British Vice Consul in Surabaya and was married to Sophia Jane Wilson (St Pancras, London, 17 May 1856 – Epsom, Surrey, 26 January 1920) and had issue, including:

- Frances Henriette Campbell (Semarang, Java, Dutch East Indies, 30 November 1904 – Lorne, Scotland, 1997), who married on 16 December 1930 Rear Admiral Keith McNeil Walter (later Campbell-Walter) (Hazaribagh, British India, 3 August 1904 – 24 April 1976), the parents of British model Fiona Campbell-Walter.
