= Evelyn Kark =

- Born: 5 December 1928; London, England
- Died: 8 March 1997 (aged 68); Burford, England

Evelyn Florence Gordine became Evelyn Kark and in business as Lucie Clayton (5 December 1928 – 8 March 1997) was a British administrator and college head.

== Life ==
Kark was born in London in 1928. Her parents were Emily Mildred (born Mallott) and William Gordine her father was a labourer. Due to the war she was moved from Chandos School in Middlesex to another in Ilkley in Yorkshire. She was working for Leslie Kark when he left Courier Magazine, to launch "Model" a model directory. A fellow office employee was Muriel Spark before she became a full-time writer. Her boss then bought the Lucie Clayton School in 1950. The school had been formed in 1928 by Sylvia Golledge. Evelyn was Kark's personal assistant and she was installed as the Principal of the new organisation. She used the name "Lucie Clayton" when creating publicity for the organisation.

In 1956 the owner, Leslie, and the Principal, Evelyn, married and it was the Kark's who ran the business. Leslie was a prolific writer and his first marriage had ended in divorce. Modelling became a higher status profession in Britain and the business moved to 66 New Bond Street.

In 1960, the Lucie Clayton dressmaking and design school was started.

In 1965 the Lucie Clayton secretarial college was launched.

In 1968 she published "The World of Modelling: How to get the London model-girl look" under her pseudonym of Lucie Clayton.

The modelling agency closed in the late 1970s but the school went on preparing young ladies for marriage, society and the Season. During the 1960s the alumni of the school included Sandra Paul, Celia Hammond, and Joanna Lumley who actually had careers modelling. Many of the student's did not expect to enter a modelling career and the business became a de facto finishing school.

In 1985 she published her second book "Modelling and Beauty Care Made Simple" and five years later the business was sold and she retired.

Kark died in Burford in 1997.
