= Eleonore von Habsburg =

Austrian jewellery designer, gemologist, and model

- Born: Eleonore Maria del Pilar Iona Christina Jelena; 28 February 1994 (age 32); Salzburg, Austria
- Education: European Business School London
- Occupations: Jewellery designer, gemologist, model
- Spouse: Jérôme d'Ambrosio (m. 2020)
- Children: 3
- Parent(s): Karl von Habsburg; Francesca Thyssen-Bornemisza
- Relatives: House of Habsburg-Lorraine

Eleonore von Habsburg (officially Eleonore Maria del Pilar Iona Christina Jelena Habsburg-Lothringen; born 28 February 1994) is an Austrian jewellery designer, gemologist, and model. She is the daughter of Karl von Habsburg, the head of the House of Habsburg-Lorraine.

== Early life and background ==
Eleonore Habsburg-Lorraine was born in 1994 in Salzburg to Karl von Habsburg, a politician and head of the House of Habsburg-Lorraine, and Francesca von Thyssen-Bornemisza de Kászon et Impérfalva, an art collector and by birth member of the Thyssen-Bornemisza family. Her maternal grandparents are Baron Hans Heinrich Thyssen-Bornemisza, an industrialist and art collector, and Fiona Frances Elaine Campbell-Walter, a model with an aristocratic background whose father, Vice-Admiral Keith McNeill Campbell-Walter, was Aide-de-camp to George VI. Her paternal grandparents were Otto, Crown Prince of Austria and Princess Regina of Saxe-Meiningen. Her paternal great-grandparents Charles I of Austria and Zita of Bourbon-Parma were the last Emperor and Empress of Austria. Her brother is racing car driver Ferdinand Habsburg.

== Education and career ==
Habsburg-Lorraine attended boarding school in Gstaad before studying law at the European Business School London. She completed her master's degree at Instituto Marangoni Milan in Fine Jewellery Design in 2020 and works as a jewellery designer. Habsburg has also worked as a fashion model, being featured in advertisement campaigns and walking the runway for Dolce & Gabbana.

== Personal life ==
On 20 July 2020, Eleonore von Habsburg-Lorraine married Belgian race car driver Jérôme d'Ambrosio in a small civil ceremony at the Civil Registry of Monaco, conducted by the Mayor of Monaco Georges Marsan. On 20 October 2021 she gave birth to a son, Otto d'Ambrosio, named after her grandfather Otto von Habsburg. On 10 August 2024, she gave birth to a daughter, Zita d'Ambrosio, named after her great-grandmother Zita of Bourbon-Parma. On 4 July 2026 the couple welcomed their second daughter, Cosima d'Ambrosio.
