= Lucie Clayton Charm Academy =

- Grosvenor Gardens; United Kingdom

Information
- Other name: Quest Professional
- Type: Finishing school
- Established: 1928
- Founder: Sylvia Lucie Golledge
- Website: http://www.questprofessional.co.uk

Lucie Clayton College was founded by Sylvia Lucie Golledge in 1928 as a modelling agency and finishing school. It was bought by Leslie Kark who owned a successful model directory. It became Britain's top modelling agency during the 1950s and 1960s with Evelyn Gordine as the principal. Gordine (later Kark) was the business's public face using the name "Lucie Clayton".

== History ==
Sylvia Lucie Golledge, a London model agent, known professionally as Lucie Clayton, founded the organisation in 1928 as a modelling agency and finishing school. It had offices in Oxford Street.

In 1950, it was bought by Arthur Leslie Kark (1910-2004) who owned a successful model directory named "Model". Kark's personal assistant Evelyn Gordine became the principal. Another employee in the office was Muriel Spark (before she was a full-time novelist). Gordine used the name "Lucie Clayton" as her business name.

In 1956 the owner, Arthur Leslie Kark, and the school principal, Evelyn Gordine, married and it was they who ran the business. Modelling became a higher status profession in Britain and the business moved to 66 New Bond Street.

The modelling agency closed in the late 1970s but the school now prepared their charges for "the Season". During the 1960s the alumni of the school included models Sandra Paul, Celia Hammond, Tania Mallet, Shirley Anne Field, Fiona Campbell-Walter and Joanna Lumley. Many of the students did not expect to enter a modelling career and the business became a de facto finishing school.

In the early 1990s, Lucie Clayton Charm Academy reinvented itself as a secretarial and business college. The courses ranged from a few days up to a full year and included skills such as shorthand to IT to budgeting, marketing, public relations, law and personal development. Along the way, students may have picked up the odd City and Guilds Foundation or London Chamber of Commerce and Industry professional qualification. At the end of the course they left with Lucie Clayton's certificate. The list of employers associated with the college includes Amanda Wakeley, Arthur Andersen, Hermes, JWT, the BBC, Vogue, and Schroders.

In 2007, Lucie Clayton College merged with two secretarial colleges, Queen's College and St James's College, to form Quest Business Training. Today it is known as "Quest Professional" and it has moved to Grosvenor Gardens. Lucie Clayton House in South Kensington, London was converted into seven serviced apartments.

== Works by Arthur Leslie Kark (1910-2004) ==
- Courier (Quarterly) (1947-1951)
- Red Rain (1945)
- The Fire Was Bright (1944)
- An Owl In The Sun (1948)
- Wings Of The Phoenix (1949)
- On The Haycock (1957)

== Notable faculty ==
- Evelyn Kark - Principal of the agency
- Jean Broke-Smith - Headteacher in Ladette to Lady.

== Notable alumni ==
- Jemma Kidd - countess, make up artist, model
- Fiona Campbell-Walter - model, socialite
- Anne Dunhill - novelist, translator, and granddaughter of Alfred Dunhill
- Celia Hammond - campaigner and founder of Celia Hammond Animal Trust
- Joanna Lumley - actress, former model
- Shirley Anne Field - actress, former model
- Pippa Bennett-Warner - actress
- Paulene Stone - Vogue cover girl
- Samantha Juste - Top of the Pops TV presenter
- Sandra Howard - novelist, wife of Michael Howard
- Maripaz Jaramillo - Colombian visual artist.
- Vicki Hodge - actress and model.
- Lorna McDonald - former model
- Jean Shrimpton - model, actress
- Carole White - model and founder of Premier Model Management
- Nuala Quinn-Barton - model, film producer and mother of actress Mischa Barton
- Tania Mallet - model, actress
