= Anne Dunhill =

Anne Dunhill, Countess Zamoyski M.A. (born 12 December 1946) is a novelist and Italian translator. She is also a former debutante and model.

== Early life and education ==
Anne is the granddaughter of Alfred Dunhill. Her parents were John Dunhill (Alfred's youngest son by his first wife) and Marjorie Brown. She was educated at Francis Holland School, Clarence Gate and La Sorbonne.

== Career ==
After a Lucie Clayton modelling course and a much publicised debutante season in 1964, she became one of the few former debutantes to make it as a model, appearing in numerous fashion magazines, advertisements and TV commercials in London, Milan and Paris between 1965 and 1969 when she went to live in Venice for six years. For the next fifteen years she was a full-time mother before doing a BA in English and Italian at Royal Holloway, University of London between 1986 and 1989. This led to two new careers as a novelist and translator. From 1996 to 2001, she was Arts Editor of Epicurean Life Magazine. In 2002, she earned an MA in Representations of Italy at Royal Holloway and converted to Roman Catholicism.

== Personal life ==
Anne married her first husband Kenneth Sweet in 1968 and divorced him three years later.

From 1969 to 1975 she lived with the Venetian artist Roberto Ferruzzi the younger. They had a son and daughter Ingo and Anita Ferruzzi.

In 1975, she married the former Administrative Director of the Royal Ballet Anthony Russell-Roberts. They had two daughters. She divorced Russell-Roberts in 1998. The sudden death of her daughter Anita Ferruzzi from pancreatic cancer inspired Anne's memoir Anita, which was published by Quartet books in 2012. She has been a vegetarian since 1970. In 2020 Anne was married to Count Zdzislaw Zamoyski, who is a bereaved parent like herself. <Daily Telegraph 21 August 2020>

== Publications ==
- Ballerina: A Dancer's Life with Marguerite Porter (1989) London: Michael O'Mara Books.
- A Darker Shade of Love (1991) London: Michael O'Mara Books. Republished 2013 on Kindle Books.
- Web of Passion (1993) London: Michael O'Mara Books. Republished 2013 on Kindle Books as The Double Cherry.
- The Nobility and Excellence of Women and the Defects and Vices of Men translated and edited by Anne Dunhill (1999) Chicago: University of Chicago Press.
- Anita: A Memoir (2012) London: Quartet Books.
- Nights at The Ballet (2013) published on Kindle Books.
