= Karl von Habsburg =

Austrian politician (born 1961)

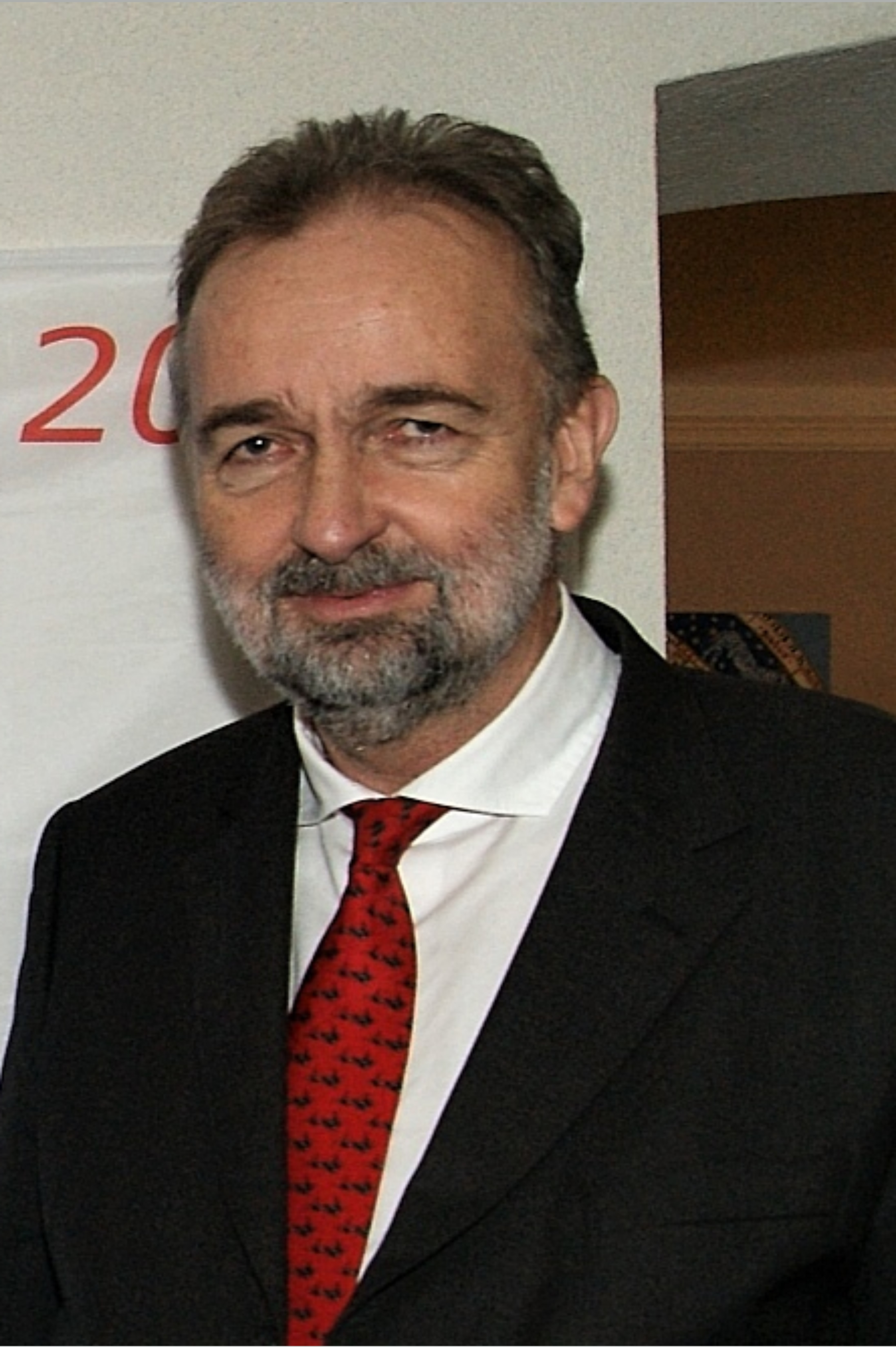
- Habsburg-Lothringen in 2022

Member of the European Parliament for Austria
- In office 1996 – 1999

Head of the House of Habsburg-Lorraine
- Reign: 1 January 2007 – present
- Predecessor: Otto von Habsburg
- Heir apparent: Ferdinand Habsburg

Personal details
- Born: 11 January 1961 (age 65) Starnberg, Bavaria, West Germany
- Party: Austrian People's Party
- Spouses: Francesca von Thyssen-Bornemisza (m. 1993; div. 2017) Christian Nicolau de Almeida Reid (m. 2022)
- Children: Eleonore Habsburg-Lothringen; Ferdinand Habsburg-Lothringen; Gloria Habsburg-Lothringen
- Parents: Otto von Habsburg (father); Regina von Sachsen-Meiningen (mother)
- Website: karlvonhabsburg.at

Karl von Habsburg (born Karl Thomas Robert Maria Franziskus Georg Bahnam; 11 January 1961) is an Austrian politician and the head of the House of Habsburg-Lorraine, the former royal house of the defunct Austro-Hungarian thrones. As a citizen of the Republic of Austria, his legal name is Karl Habsburg-Lothringen.

Karl is the son of Otto von Habsburg and Regina von Sachsen-Meiningen, and the grandson of the last Austro-Hungarian emperor, Charles I. He is Grand Master and Sovereign of the Austrian branch of the Order of the Golden Fleece. Karl Habsburg served as a member of the European Parliament for the Austrian People's Party (1996–1999). He is known for being pro-European and is also an advocate for the Pan-European movement.

Karl Habsburg's career has focused on the issue of protecting cultural heritage from threats such as armed conflict and natural disasters. He was president of the cultural protection organization Blue Shield International from 2008 until August 2020. In 1992/1993, he hosted a TV game show with Austrian public TV broadcaster ORF, called Who Is Who.

== Early life and background ==
Karl Habsburg was born on 11 January 1961 in Starnberg, Bavaria. He was baptised in Pöcking, Bavaria, as Archduke Karl of Austria (Erzherzog Karl von Österreich), the name entered in the baptismal records.

At the time of his birth, his father was de facto stateless and possessed a Spanish diplomatic passport (he had grown up in Spain), while his mother was a German citizen. Like his father and siblings, he was banished from Austria for the first years of his life. However, the administrative court of Austria later ruled that applying to return to the country was legal, and his family was granted visa entrance in June 1966.

=== House of Habsburg titles and issues ===
In 1961, Karl's father, Otto von Habsburg, renounced all claims to the defunct Austrian throne, as a necessary legal condition to being allowed to return to Austria. Karl does not use his ancestral titles, because unlike most European countries, even the unofficial use of such titles is not permitted in Hungary and Austria. Habsburg says:

I don't refer to titles, I'm not that vain. People use these titles out of respect for history and the role of my family in history.

Although the Adelsaufhebungsgesetz (Law on the Abolition of the Nobility) abolished all Austrian and Hungarian noble, royal, and imperial titles in 1919, and their usage is still illegal in those countries, media elsewhere occasionally refer to Karl Habsburg by his ancestral titles of Archduke of Austria, Royal Prince of Hungary, Bohemia and Croatia. (Note: For some examples of this usage, see Burke's Guide to the Royal Family, edited by Hugh Montgomery-Massingberd, published by Burke's Peerage, London, 1973, p. 240. ISBN 0-220-66222-3; Nicolas Enache's La Descendance de Marie-Therese de Habsburg, published by ICC, Paris, 1996. pp. 44, 50; Chantal de Badts de Cugnac and Guy Coutant de Saisseval's Le Petit Gotha, published by Nouvelle Imprimerie Laballery, Paris 2002, pp. 201–202. ISBN 2-9507974-3-1; the Genealogisches Handbuch des Adels, Fürstliche Häuser Vol. XVI, published by C.A. Starke Verlag, 2001, pp. 87–90. ISBN 3-79800824-8 (Note: The family name of Karl Habsburg's father was declared to be Habsburg-Lothringen by an Austrian ministerial decision in 1957 and by a German court (Landgericht Würzburg) on 16 July 1958. Otto was, however, at the time de facto stateless, living in Germany with a Spanish diplomatic passport, and was denied both entry to Austria and an Austrian passport. Otto's official name as a German citizen from 1978 was Otto von Habsburg.))

At the request of the USSR, which was wary of a restoration of the monarchy, the anti-Habsburg laws became mandatory international and constitutional components of the Austrian State Treaty in 1955. The family tried to get their former property returned under rules for victims of the Nazi regime. The attempt of Karl Habsburg failed because the law of expropriation still has constitutional status. On 1 January 2007, his father relinquished his position as the head of the House of Habsburg-Lorraine, a status which then devolved on Karl. In 2008, he became the Grand Master of the Order of Saint George.

As head of the House of Habsburg-Lorraine, Karl undertakes numerous commitments. On the one hand, these are cultural, historical, political, but also tourist events and, on the other hand, commitments to orders of chivalry, associations or military units. Many events, such as the participation in the peace flight in 2018 as a pilot with his plane, concerned the centenary of World War I. In 2019 there were many events in honor of his ancestor Holy Roman Emperor Maximilian I. He is supported in this work by an adjutant general.

On 24 June 2026, he met with Petr Pavel in the President's offices at Prague Castle. The meeting was not only the first between a President of the Czech Republic and a member of the former ruling House of Habsburg, but also the first official visit by the Head of the House of Habsburg to Prague Castle since 1918.

=== Education ===
Between 1982 and 1989, Habsburg studied law, philosophy, and political science at the University of Salzburg, passing his first staatsexamen in 1984; while there, he spent a year studying law and philosophy at Michigan State University in the United States. He received graduate degrees in business and law from Imadec Executive Education in 2012.

== Career ==
=== Military service ===
Karl Habsburg did his military service in 1981 as a platoon commander of a Jäger (infantry) platoon as a one-year volunteer with the Austrian Armed Forces, where he later also completed his pilot training. He is a reserve Hauptmann (captain) in the Austrian Air Force. He is also an Austrian Army Cultural Property Protection Officer, first with the staff of the Military Command of Salzburg, later with the Armed Forces High Command, currently with IHSW at Staff College. As a paratrooper, he was elected President of the European Military Paratroopers Association (Europäischer Militär- Fallschirmsprungverband e.V.) in 2001 - a role that he still holds today.

=== Activism ===
From 1986 to 2024, Karl von Habsburg was president of the Austrian branch of the Paneuropean Union, which co-organised the Pan-European Picnic. In May 1990, Habsburg personally led an aid convoy to Vilnius with food, medicine and clothing as a representative of the Paneuropean Union, in response to the Soviet Union's blockade of raw materials following the proclamation of Lithuanian independence in March 1990. In 1991 he organized international aid against the destruction in Dubrovnik and in the former Yugoslavia. In 2024, he was named first honorary president of the Austrian branch of the Paneuropean Union.

=== European Parliament ===
In October 1996, Habsburg was elected as a member of the European Parliament (MEP) for Austria, representing the Austrian People's Party.

=== Unrepresented Nations and Peoples Organization ===
On 19 January 2002, he was appointed Director General of UNPO (Unrepresented Nations and Peoples Organization) by the UNPO Steering Committee.

=== Blue Shield ===
From 7 December 2008, he became the President of the Association of National Committees of the Blue Shield, a cultural protection organisation that later became Blue Shield International. Habsburg was a strong supporter of those who created the "No Strike List" of cultural heritage sites and cultural sites that should be preserved when attacks or flight operations were carried out. This particularly moved NATO troops to protect the cultural assets and the economic and cultural basis of the civilian population.

Habsburg particularly supports the bringing together of military and civilian personnel and the cooperation of various international organizations for the protection of cultural assets, such as the Blue Shield, UNIFIL and UNESCO deployment in Lebanon in 2019, and the cooperation with the International Committee of the Red Cross in 2020. After the explosion in the port of Beirut in Lebanon in summer 2020, Habsburg helped coordinate the reconstruction and aid on site. He stepped down as President of the Blue Shield at the General Assembly in August 2020.

Since 2010 he has been chairman of the advisory board of the Competence Center for Cultural Heritage and Cultural Property Protection at the University of Vienna. He delivers lectures and training courses worldwide on the role of the military in protecting cultural property, such as at the United States Africa Command, the Civil-Military Cooperation Centre of Excellence or the Theresian Military Academy. He emphasizes that it is crucial for cultural property protection to be on the spot quickly: "We know the importance to be fast and in a place where there is a potential conflict or an actual conflict; you have to be there really fast to make an assessment and to see what you can do to immediately help."

=== Business and media activities ===
In 1992/1993, he hosted a TV game show with Austrian public TV broadcaster ORF, called Who Is Who.

Since 2009, he has been a shareholder in a media group in the Netherlands, consisting of radio stations, a magazine and a music television channel. He is also one of the three co-founders of BG Privatinvest, a Vienna-based investment company. In December 2010 the company acquired the two most important Bulgarian daily newspapers, Dneven Trud and 24 Chasa. After ongoing conflicts with Bulgarian partners, BG Privatinvest sold the newspapers in April 2011.

== Personal life ==
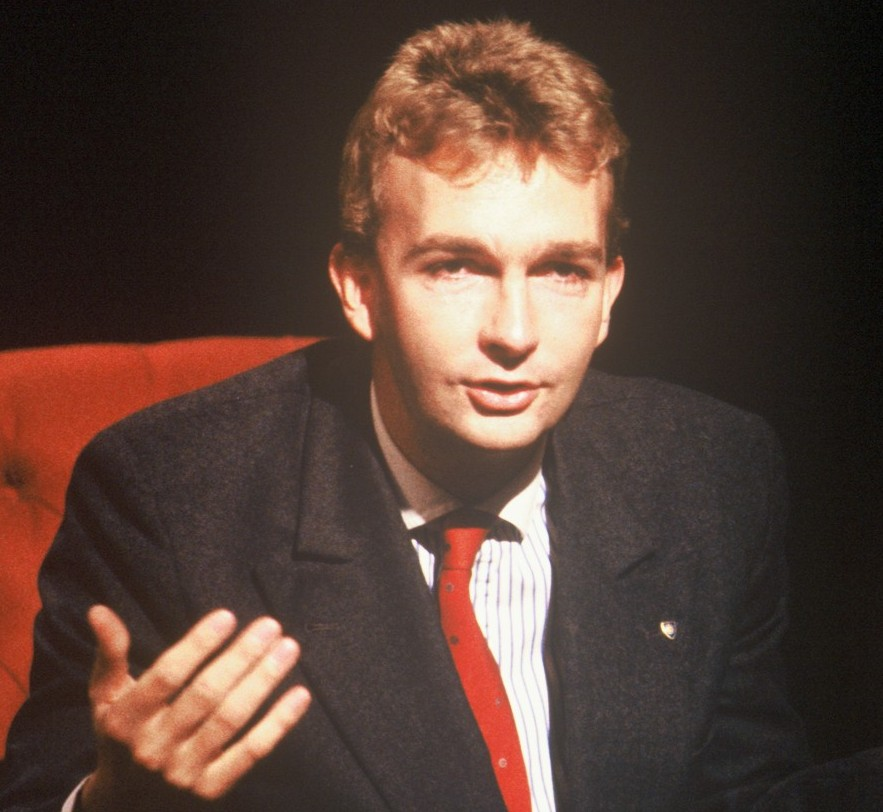
Appearing on British television programme After Dark in 1989

Habsburg has lived in Austria since 1981 and resided in Casa Austria, formerly called Villa Swoboda, in Anif, near the city of Salzburg, until 2022. On 31 January 1993 in Mariazell, he married Baroness Francesca Thyssen-Bornemisza (born 7 June 1958 in Lausanne), the only daughter of Baron Hans Heinrich Thyssen-Bornemisza de Kászon, a European industrialist, and his third wife, the fashion model Fiona Frances Elaine Campbell-Walter. The marriage received the dynastic authorization of Karl's father, as head of the House of Habsburg, despite objections from some members of the family as the bride, although a baroness in the nobility of pre-republican Hungary and Transylvania, did not descend in the canonically legitimate male line from a family of dynastic (ruling or formerly ruling or mediatised) status.

After 10 years of marriage, the couple separated in 2003. They divorced in 2017.

Karl and Francesca have three children:

- Eleonore Maria del Pilar Iona Christina Jelena (born 28 February 1994 in Salzburg). Married civilly to Jérôme d'Ambrosio on 20 July 2020. They have three children.
- Ferdinand Zvonimir Maria Balthus Keith Michael Otto Antal Bahnam Leonhard (born 21 June 1997 in Salzburg).
- Gloria Maria Bogdana Paloma Regina Fiona Gabriela (born 15 October 1999 in Salzburg), her godmother is Gloria, Princess of Thurn and Taxis.

In March 2020, during the COVID-19 pandemic, he tested positive for the virus. Habsburg self-isolated at home. Karl von Habsburg was officially declared healthy after almost three weeks of quarantine. After his illness, Karl Habsburg encouraged everyone to follow the official protective measures strictly, and asked survivors of the disease to donate blood plasma.

In the spring of 2022 in Portugal, Karl married Christian Nicolau de Almeida Reid (née Elisabeth Christiane Reid), a woman of Portuguese descent, in a civil ceremony.

== Controversies ==
In July 1998 an Austrian court fined Karl von Habsburg 180,000 schillings ($14,300); he had failed to declare immediately to customs officials that he had an antique diadem in his luggage when he crossed the border from Switzerland in July 1996. The diadem belonged to his wife who intended to wear it at a wedding ceremony.

Also in 1998, evidence emerged that during Habsburg's election campaign for membership in the European Parliament two years prior, his political party the ÖVP, had benefited from at least 30,000 Marks worth of World Vision donations via Paneurope Austria while Karl Habsburg sat on the board of World Vision Austria, apparently without noticing the director's dubiously legal activities. His father exacerbated the controversy when he complained that his son was being attacked unfairly and drew a parallel between the name "Habsburg" and a yellow badge. ÖVP did not nominate Karl von Habsburg again for the 1999 elections. In 2004, Karl von Habsburg paid 37,000 euros to the new World Vision Austria branch.

== Honours ==
=== Dynastic ===
- (Austria-Hungary) House of Habsburg-Lorraine:
  - Sovereign and Grand Master of the Order of the Golden Fleece
  - Sovereign of the Order of the Starry Cross
  - Sovereign and Grand Master of the Order of Saint George
- (Kingdom of the Two Sicilies) House of Bourbon-Two Sicilies:
  - Knight of the Sacred Military Constantinian Order of Saint George

=== National ===
- Tonga:
  - Knight Grand Cross, Special Class of The Most Devoted Royal Household Order of Tonga
  - King Tupou VI Coronation Medal
- : Sovereign Military Order of Malta
  - Bailiff Grand Cross of Honour and Devotion of the Sovereign Military Order of Malta
- Ukraine
  - Order of Merit, Third Class

=== Other ===
- Grand Master of the Military Order of Saint Sebastian in Europe (Ritterschaft vom Heiligen Sebastianus in Europa)
- Supreme Bearer of the Couleur of the Austrian Catholic Student Fraternities ("katholisch-österreichischen Landsmannschaften")
- Protector of the Order of Knights of Wine (Ordo Equestris Vini Europae)
- Ehrenritter of the Teutonic Order

== See also ==
- Heads of former ruling families
