= Courier (Quarterly) =

British magazine

Cover of the tenth anniversary issue

The Courier was a magazine published in Britain from 1938 to 1951 by Arthur Leslie Kark (1910-2004) as Norman Kark Publications. It was printed mainly on art paper and continued to be produced throughout World War II, in spite of the paper restrictions imposed. Each issue included approximately 180 pages, 7½ inches wide by 7 inches deep: at the time, Britain's daily newspapers were rationed to only four pages.

There were usually four issues a year (although there were some issues that were missed). The price was three shillings, A Penguin pocket book only cost six pence in 1940 (one sixth of the price). The sub-title was "Picturing Today". Each copy had a large number of Satire articles, one or more shaggy dog story was always included. In addition there was a section of art photographs, including chaste "nude studies" of women, countryside and seascape photographs. Some issues had coloured fold=outs and others had humour inserts printed on standard paper .

The contents were grouped into the following sections:

- Satire - which included cartoons and a short topical article, as well as a "Shaggy Dog" story.
- Transatlantic - Articles about New York and other US news items.
- Life in Pictures - Photos and other illustrations.
- Day and Age - General, Technical and Historic articles.
- Departments - including; The Mode, The Stage, The Screen, and The Page.
- Fiction - Short stories, including a handful by the better-known British authors of the day, including A. A. Milne, Saki, John Galsworthy, and Robert Standish.

The production of the Courier was extended after 1951 as a monthly publication, with a different format and fewer pages.

During the fifties, the Courier changed to a 100-plus page magazine. It incorporated the material from the discontinued publication called TO-DAY.

A sister magazine was published monthly by Norman Kark called Bandwagon. It was a smaller format than the Courier, but printed on the same high quality art paper. It started just after the end of the Second World War and stopped publishing in the early 1950s. The contents was on all aspects of entertainment, with sections on art, fashion, music (both classic and popular), the stage, the cinema and biographic sketches.

== See also ==
- Lucie Clayton Charm Academy
