= Carole White =

British model

Carole White is a British former model, and co-founder of Premier Model Management.

== Early life ==
White was born in Deal, Kent in 1950 but raised in Ghana. At the age of five she was sent to a boarding-school in England, then later to a convent in Belgium, an experience she described as repressive but one that helped shape her future career and fuel her interest in modelling. She became a model at the Lucy Clayton Modelling Academy, then decided this career was not for her. Instead she became a booker and in 1970 joined London model agency Bobton's, where she stayed for seven years looking after the early modeling careers of Jo Wood, Andrea Dellal and the Bond girl Tania Mallet.

== Premier Model Management ==
In 1981, together with her brother Chris Owen, she founded Premier Model Management. Initially representing 40 girls, they ran the agency from their kitchen table. She was Naomi Campbell's agent when the model became the first black woman to make it on the cover of the French Vogue in 1988.

White is a campaigner against racial discrimination in fashion.

In autumn 2010 Premier Model Management allowed television cameras into their offices for the filming of Channel 4's The Model Agency. The seven part documentary followed White and her co-workers for two months revealing what life is really like behind the scenes. It aired in the UK in February 2011. Her contract with Naomi Campbell stopped over a dispute regarding a perfume commercial.

== Charles Taylor trial ==
In 2010, White testified at the trial of former Liberian President Charles Taylor, alleging that her former client, Naomi Campbell, had accepted blood diamonds from him. In a statement, White says that she remembers Taylor attending the 1997 dinner in South Africa and saying he would like to give diamonds to Campbell.

== Books ==
- White, Carole (2015). Have I Said Too Much?: My Life In and Out of The Model Agency. Century. ISBN 978-1780890722.
