= Sandra Howard =

British model and novelist

- Born: Sandra Clare Paul; August 1940 (age 86)
- Occupations: Novelist; model

Sandra Howard, Lady Howard of Lympne (born August 1940) is an English novelist, former model and the wife of Michael Howard, a former leader of the Conservative Party.

== Life ==
Born Sandra Clare Paul in August 1940. She was trained at the Lucy Clayton Modelling Agency and as Sandra Paul, she was a well-known model in the 1960s and was featured on the cover of American Vogue for two months in a row. She was photographed by David Bailey and Norman Parkinson and was acquainted with John F Kennedy, Frank Sinatra and Bob Dylan.

She has been married four times, the first of which was when she was 18 to jazz pianist Robin Douglas-Home, the nephew of the former Prime Minister, Alec Douglas-Home. She has a son, Sholto, from this marriage. She was later married to David Wynne-Morgan, a publicist, whom she also divorced. She then married advertising executive Nigel Grandfield.

It was while married to Grandfield that she met Michael Howard at a Red Cross Ball. She and Howard subsequently married in 1975. They have a son and a daughter.

She has written five novels, the most recent, Tell the Girl, was published on 3 July 2014. She made a brief foray back to her modelling career in the 1990s by posing for Marks & Spencer catalogues.

== Publications ==
- Glass houses, Simon & Schuster, 2006. ISBN 9781416521983
- Ursula's Story, Simon & Schuster, 2008. ISBN 9781416521990
- Ex-wives, Simon & Schuster, 2010. ISBN 9781847392619
- A Matter of Loyalty, Simon & Schuster, 2012. ISBN 9781847392602
- Tell the Girl, Simon & Schuster, 2014. ISBN 9781471111358
