= TBA21 Thyssen-Bornemisza Art Contemporary =

Contemporary art and advocacy foundation

Thyssen-Bornemisza Art Contemporary
- Established: 2002; 24 years ago
- Location: Madrid, Spain
- Type: Contemporary art foundation
- Founder: Francesca Thyssen-Bornemisza
- Director: Markus Reymann, Rosa Ferré
- Website: www.tba21.org

TBA21 Thyssen-Bornemisza Art Contemporary is a contemporary art and advocacy foundation established in 2002 by philanthropist Francesca Thyssen-Bornemisza. The foundation, headquartered in Madrid, Spain is known for managing the TBA21 Collection and overseeing exhibitions, commissions, residencies, public programs, and art projects focused on social, environmental, and political issues.

TBA21 collaborates with the Thyssen-Bornemisza National Museum through a long-term agreement focused on joint exhibition production and public programming. In 2023, the partnership launched Organismo, an independent study program addressing the intersection of the arts and ecological transformation.

TBA21 also operates Ocean Space, in Venice, Italy, and works in collaboration with the Alligator Head Foundation in Portland, Jamaica.

From 2002 to 2012, TBA21 operated its first exhibition space at the Erdődy-Fürstenberg Palace in Vienna. It later moved to Vienna's Augarten park (2012–2017), where it organized biannual thematic exhibitions.

Between 2021 and 2024, TBA21 partnered with the Regional Government of Andalusia to exhibit works at the Centro de Creación Contemporánea de Andalucía (C3A) in Córdoba.

== TBA21 Collection ==
The TBA21 Collection comprises more than 1000 works of contemporary art by artists such as John Akomfrah, Marina Abramović, Monica Bonvicini, Kutluğ Ataman, Candice Breitz, Olafur Eliasson, Joan Jonas, Pipilotti Rist, Simon Starling, Sanja Iveković, Wu Tsang, Ai Weiwei, and others.

The foundation began commissioning new work in 2005, with early commissions by Christoph Schlingensief, Candice Breitz and others.

One notable work, Küba (2004) by Kutluğ Ataman, was exhibited aboard the converted barge Negrelli for a tour on the Danube river in 2006. In 2020, the work was donated to the Museo Nacional Centro de Arte Reina Sofía.

== TBA21–Academy ==
Founded in 2011, TBA21–Academy serves as the foundation’s research arm, emphasizing oceanic and ecological themes through transdisciplinary collaboration. The Academy integrates artistic practices with scientific and policy-oriented research.

In 2015, its research expedition to the Solomon Islands led to the first recorded observation of bioluminescence in Hawksbill sea turtles, in collaboration with marine biologist David Gruber, an event recognized by National Geographic.

The Academy’s The Current fellowship program invites artists, curators, and researchers to participate in long-term collaborative knowledge production.

In 2019, Ocean Space opened in the Church of San Lorenzo, Venice, as a center for oceanic advocacy through the arts. The space launched with Moving Off the Land II by Joan Jonas, based on the artist's extended research into marine life and aquatic environments.

Also in 2019, the Academy launched Ocean-Archive.org, a digital platform for ocean-focused artistic and research projects.

== Advocacy and initiatives ==
TBA21 leverages its Observer status at the International Seabed Authority—a designation received in 2017—as a platform to advocate against deep-sea mining and to promote the inclusion of Indigenous and interdisciplinary knowledge in ocean governance discussions.

In partnership with the Alligator Head Foundation, TBA21 supports an artist residency focused on artistic inquiry of ecological challenges. One outcome is an underwater sculpture park by Swiss artist Claudia Comte in the East Portland Fish Sanctuary.

Other artists who have participated in the TBA21–Academy residency at Alligator Head Foundation include Joan Jonas, Susanne Winterling, Dark Morph (Carl Michael von Hausswolff and Jónsi), and Dineo Seshee Bopape.

In 2021, the collective Superflex presented Vertical Migration, a work co-commissioned by TBA21, on the facade of the United Nations Headquarters during the 76th UN General Assembly, highlighting issues related to climate change and ocean life.

TBA21 also contributed to the High-Level Event on Ocean Action in Costa Rica in June 2024, leading up to the UN Ocean Conference in 2025, with a curated artist film program.

== Awards and recognitions ==
- FlashArt Italia Award for TBA21–Academy's Ocean Space (2025)
- ELLE Women Awards for Social Commitment (2024) to TBA21 Founder Francesca Thyssen-Bornemisza
- TBA21 ranked 12th in La Fábrica’s Observatorio de la Cultura for social commitment and sustainability, alongside Museo del Prado and Fundación La Caixa (2024)
- InspirAction WAS Award (2023). Francesca Thyssen-Bornemisza received the Women Action Sustainability Award in the Culture and Communication category for promoting sustainability awareness and cultural rights through TBA21’s initiatives, including artist commissions and heritage preservation efforts in Ukraine.
- La Vanguardia – Best Spanish contemporary art foundation (2023)
- Apollo Awards 2023 Exhibition of the Year – for In the Eye of the Storm: Modernism in Ukraine, 1900–1930s, November 29, 2022–May 2, 2023.
- Laureate for the Environmental category of the UN SIDS Partnerships Awards 2023 – the collaborative initiative “Alliances for a Bluer, Greener Caribbean (Ridge to Reef)” involving the Alligator Head Foundation (AHF), Coconut Industry Board (CIB), and the International Trade Centre (ITC), aimed at promoting a sustainable coconut sector in the Caribbean, was recognized by the UN SIDS Partnership Awards 2023.
