= Francesca Thyssen-Bornemisza =

Austrian archduchess

- Thyssen-Bornemisza in 2025
- Born: Francesca Anna Dolores Freiin von Thyssen-Bornemisza de Kászon et Impérfalva; 7 June 1958 (age 68); Lausanne, Switzerland
- Spouse: Karl von Habsburg (m. 1993; div. 2017) Markus Reymann (m. 2025)
- Issue: Eleonore Habsburg-Lothringen; Ferdinand Habsburg-Lothringen; Gloria Habsburg-Lothringen
- Father: Baron Hans Heinrich Thyssen-Bornemisza
- Mother: Fiona Campbell-Walter

Francesca Anna Dolores von Thyssen-Bornemisza de Kászon et Impérfalva (formerly Francesca von Habsburg; born 7 June 1958) is a Swiss art collector, curator and philanthropist. By birth, she is a member of the House of Thyssen-Bornemisza. She is also the former wife of Karl von Habsburg, current head of the House of Habsburg-Lorraine.

She is the founder and chair of TBA21 Thyssen-Bornemisza Art Contemporary and the co-founder of TBA21–Academy (along with Markus Reymann), a research platform that connects contemporary art with ocean science, climate politics, and environmental justice. She has repeatedly appeared on the ARTnews Top 200 Collectors list.

For more than two decades, she has commissioned and supported artistic and research initiatives addressing subjects including climate change, ocean-related issues, migration, and historical narratives. She has also established or contributed to marine conservation projects in Jamaica and the Caribbean, including the Alligator Head Foundation and the East Portland Fish Sanctuary.

== Early life ==
Thyssen-Bornemisza was born in Lausanne, the daughter of Baron Hans Heinrich von Thyssen-Bornemisza and his third wife, fashion model Fiona Frances Elaine Campbell-Walter, the only daughter of Rear Admiral Keith McNeil Walter (later Campbell-Walter) (1904–1976), aide de camp of King George VI and his wife, Frances Henriette Campbell (b. 1904), daughter of Sir Edward Campbell, 1st Baronet. She was educated at Le Rosey in Switzerland and at the age of eighteen attended Saint Martin's School of Art in London, but left after two years.

== Career ==
After leaving Saint Martin's School of Art, she worked as an actress, singer and model. Her partying lifestyle in London in the 1980s earned her reputation as an It girl.

For the ten years after she left Saint Martin's, she lived in England, New York and Los Angeles before moving to Lugano to become curator for her father's art collection. During the 1991–1995 Croatian War of Independence she visited the country to help protect Croatia's heritage and artworks and to help restore churches and paintings damaged during the fighting.

Thyssen-Bornemisza also appeared as Queen Marie-Henriette of Belgium in the production The Crown Prince (2006), directed by Robert Dornhelm.

=== Work in the Balkans and heritage protection ===
In the early 1990s, during the Balkan wars, Thyssen-Bornemisza took part in cultural-heritage preservation efforts in Croatia. Based in Dubrovnik for periods, she contributed to the documentation of damage to churches, monasteries, libraries, and museums and organized an international restoration workshop in a Franciscan monastery, bringing conservators from institutions such as the Uffizi and the Getty.

During this time, she first visited the ruined Renaissance Franciscan monastery on the island of Lopud, off Dubrovnik, which she later leased long-term and oversaw its restoration as Lopud1483, a venue that incorporates preserved medieval architecture alongside works from the Thyssen collections and contemporary commissions.

=== TBA21 ===
Francesca Thyssen-Bornemisza is the founder and chairwoman of the foundation TBA21 Thyssen-Bornemisza Art Contemporary, which she founded in Vienna in 2002.

In its first decade, TBA21 commissioned works by contemporary artists, often outside the commercial gallery structures. Together with chief curator Daniela Zyman, Thyssen-Bornemisza has commissioned more than 100 works, including around 30 sound pieces, by artists such as Janet Cardiff & George Bures Miller, Olafur Eliasson, Carsten Höller, Sharon Lockhart, Ragnar Kjartansson, Matthew Ritchie, Ernesto Neto, Joan Jonas, and Tomás Saraceno.

TBA21's first major co-commission, Küba (2004) by Turkish artist Kutluğ Ataman, produced with Artangel and the Carnegie International, focused on Kurdish communities in Istanbul.

The TBA21 collection now comprises more than 1000 works, many of which are large-scale or installation-based and circulate internationally through loans to museums and biennials rather than being housed in a dedicated institution.

=== TBA21–Academy ===
In 2011, she co-founded TBA21–Academy with Markus Reymann as the research arm of TBA21, with a mandate to support artistic and interdisciplinary projects focused on marine and ecological issues.

In 2019, TBA21–Academy inaugurated Ocean Space in the restored Church of San Lorenzo in Venice, establishing a permanent venue for exhibitions, performances, and public programs centered on ocean-related research and artistic production. Since its inauguration, Ocean Space has presented commissions by artists including Joan Jonas, Diana Policarpo, and Claudia Comte.

TBA21–Academy’s activities also extend to participation in international environmental and policy forums. The organization has contributed to United Nations Ocean Conferences and other multilateral platforms.

=== Alligator Head Foundation and Caribbean initiatives ===
Beyond Europe, Thyssen-Bornemisza founded the Alligator Head Foundation (AHF) in Portland, Jamaica. Established to support the East Portland Fish Sanctuary and related marine research and community initiatives, AHF operates a marine laboratory and reef-restoration programs and administers sustainable-livelihood and educational activities. The sanctuary encompasses several kilometers of coastline near the Blue Lagoon and has received significant private funding from Thyssen-Bornemisza

AHF has organized events such as festivals, workshops, and scientific meetings that bring together marine biologists, local residents, and artists to address issues including climate change, overfishing, and models for sustainable marine economies.

Thyssen-Bornemisza has also supported projects related to marine conservation in other regions, including initiatives focused on shark protection around Cocos Island in Costa Rica, as well as artist residencies that engage with marine science.

== Engagement with museums and public institutions ==
=== Museo Nacional Thyssen-Bornemisza (Madrid) ===
Francesca Thyssen-Bornemisza is a board member of the Museo Nacional Thyssen-Bornemisza.

A long-term agreement between TBA21 and the museum has led to a series of major exhibitions and programs that insert contemporary works—often from the TBA21 collection—into dialogue with historic holdings.

- In 2025, the museum and TBA21 presented “Terraphilia: Beyond the Human in the Thyssen-Bornemisza Collections”, an exhibition of around 90–100 works from the historical Thyssen collections, the Carmen Thyssen collection, and TBA21.

=== Other partnerships ===
TBA21 maintains long-term collaborations with institutions such as:

- Centro de Creación Contemporánea de Andalucía (C3A) in Córdoba, where exhibitions like “Abundant Futures” and “Ecologías de la paz” have addressed ecology, migration, and peace. TBA21 partnered with C3A and regional authorities in Andalusia, to co-produce commissions between 2022 and 2025 that connect contemporary practices to archaeological sites, agricultural landscapes, and local communities.
- MACBA (Barcelona) and other European institutions, which occasionally host the works of the foundation.

== Personal life ==
Francesca married the heir to the Habsburg dynasty, Karl von Habsburg, son of Otto von Habsburg, in Mariazell on 31 January 1993. They have three children.

- Eleonore von Habsburg (born 28 February 1994 in Salzburg). Married civilly to Jérôme d'Ambrosio on 20 July 2020. They have three children.
- Ferdinand Zvonimir von Habsburg (born 21 June 1997 in Salzburg).
- Gloria (born 15 October 1999 in Salzburg), whose godparents are Gloria, Princess of Thurn and Taxis, and Hereditary Prince Heinrich of Sayn-Wittgenstein-Sayn.

Francesca and Karl separated in 2003, but did not divorce until 2017. Considering this separation, Karl's sister, Archduchess Gabriella, has assumed, since their mother Regina's death in 2010, the rank of Grand Mistress of the Order of the Starry Cross that Francesca would otherwise normally have assumed as the wife of the heir. As the wife of the head of the House of Habsburg Francesca and her children are often accorded the unofficial honorifics of Imperial and Royal Archdukes (or duchesses) of Austria. However, these titles are disputed due to the non-dynastic character of the marriage between parties of unequal rank; further, they have no legal recognition as Austria is a republic and all former royal and noble titles were abolished in 1919.

In 2025, she married Markus Reymann.

She owns a residence in Port Antonio, Jamaica, where she co-produced an album of reggae music.

== Honours ==
=== Dynastic Orders ===
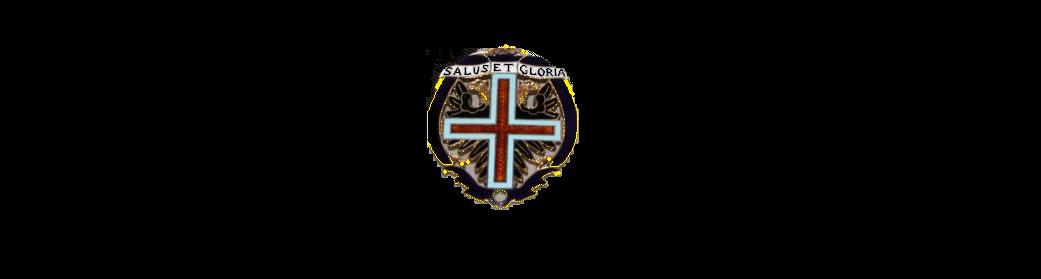
- Dame of the Order of the Starry Cross (House of Habsburg)

=== Austrian Order ===
- Commander of the Decoration of Honour for Services to the Republic of Austria, Gold

=== Croatian Order ===
- Order of Danica Hrvatska

== Awards ==
- Gold Medal of Merit for cultural engagement, City of Vienna (2009).
- Simmons Award for Philanthropic Excellence (2015).
- MadBlue “Five Oceans” Award, Madrid, for environmentally committed artistic patronage (2021).
- Order of Distinction (Officer Class) from Jamaica (2021), for contributions to marine ecosystem restoration in Portland.
- ARCO Foundation Collecting Award in the category “Philanthropy and International Collection,” Spain (2022),
- Order of Princess Olga, 3rd Class - awarded by the Government of Ukraine, for her cultural commitment to Ukraine and its artistic heritage (2025).

== See also ==
- Thyssen family
