= Keith McNeil Campbell-Walter =

Royal Navy Rear Admiral (1904–1976)

Rear-Admiral Keith McNeil Campbell-Walter CB
- Campbell-Walter in 1955
- Born: 31 August 1904
- Died: 24 April 1976 (aged 71)
- Allegiance: United Kingdom
- Branch: Royal Navy
- Service years: 1922–1958
- Rank: Rear-Admiral
- Commands: Commander of Allied Naval Forces Northern Area, Central Europe
- Conflicts: World War II
- Awards: CB

Rear-Admiral Keith McNeil Campbell-Walter CB (born Keith McNeil Walter, 31 August 1904 – 24 April 1976) was a senior Royal Navy officer.

== Naval career ==
Born on 31 August 1904, Keith McNeil Campbell-Walter was educated at Bedford School and at Britannia Royal Naval College. He was commissioned in the Royal Navy and served during the Second World War. He was promoted to the rank of Commander in 1938, Captain in 1945, Commodore in 1954 and Rear Admiral in 1955. He was appointed Aide-de-camp to Queen Elizabeth II in 1954, Flag Officer, Germany, and Commander of Allied Naval Forces Northern Area, Central Europe, between 1955 and 1958.

Campbell-Walter was invested as a Companion of the Order of the Bath in 1957. He retired from the Royal Navy in July 1958, and died on 24 April 1976, aged 71.

He was the son-in-law of Sir Edward Taswell Campbell, the father of Fiona Campbell-Walter and the grandfather of Baroness Francesca Thyssen-Bornemisza and Jamie Campbell-Walter.
