= Order of St. George (Habsburg-Lorraine) =

European dynastic order of chivalry

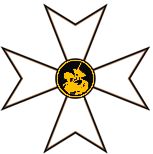

Awarded by the Head of the House of Habsburg-Lorraine
- Type: Dynastic order
- Established: 18 January 2008
- Royal house: Habsburg-Lorraine
- Religious affiliation: Christian
- Motto: Viribus Unitis
- Grand Master: Archduke Karl
- Deputy Grand Master: Archduke Georg
- Procurator: Vinzenz von Stimpfl-Abele

Precedence
- Next (higher): Order of the Golden Fleece
- Ribbon bar of the order

The Order of St. George – a European Order of the House of Habsburg-Lorraine (German: St. Georgs-Orden – ein Europäischer Orden des Hauses Habsburg-Lothringen), or simply Order of Saint George, is a dynastic order of chivalry and thus a house order of the House of Habsburg-Lorraine, the former Imperial and Royal House of the Holy Roman Empire, the Habsburg monarchy, the Empire of Austria, the Austro-Hungarian Monarchy, the Kingdom of Hungary, the Crown lands of Bohemia and Kingdom of Croatia-Slavonia and further nations.

The order combines knightly tradition with the idea of a united Europe in the sense of the political ideas of Archduke Otto von Habsburg. The roots of the order go back a long way, not in the sense of an uninterrupted continuity, but in the continuation of an ideal of Christian chivalry. The history of the Order in Central Europe begins in the Kingdom of Hungary in the 14th century, experienced its heyday as a Habsburg house order at the beginning of modern times, was reinterpreted after the end of the First World War and continued as a dynastic house order of the 21st century on behalf of Archduke Otto and his son Karl von Habsburg.

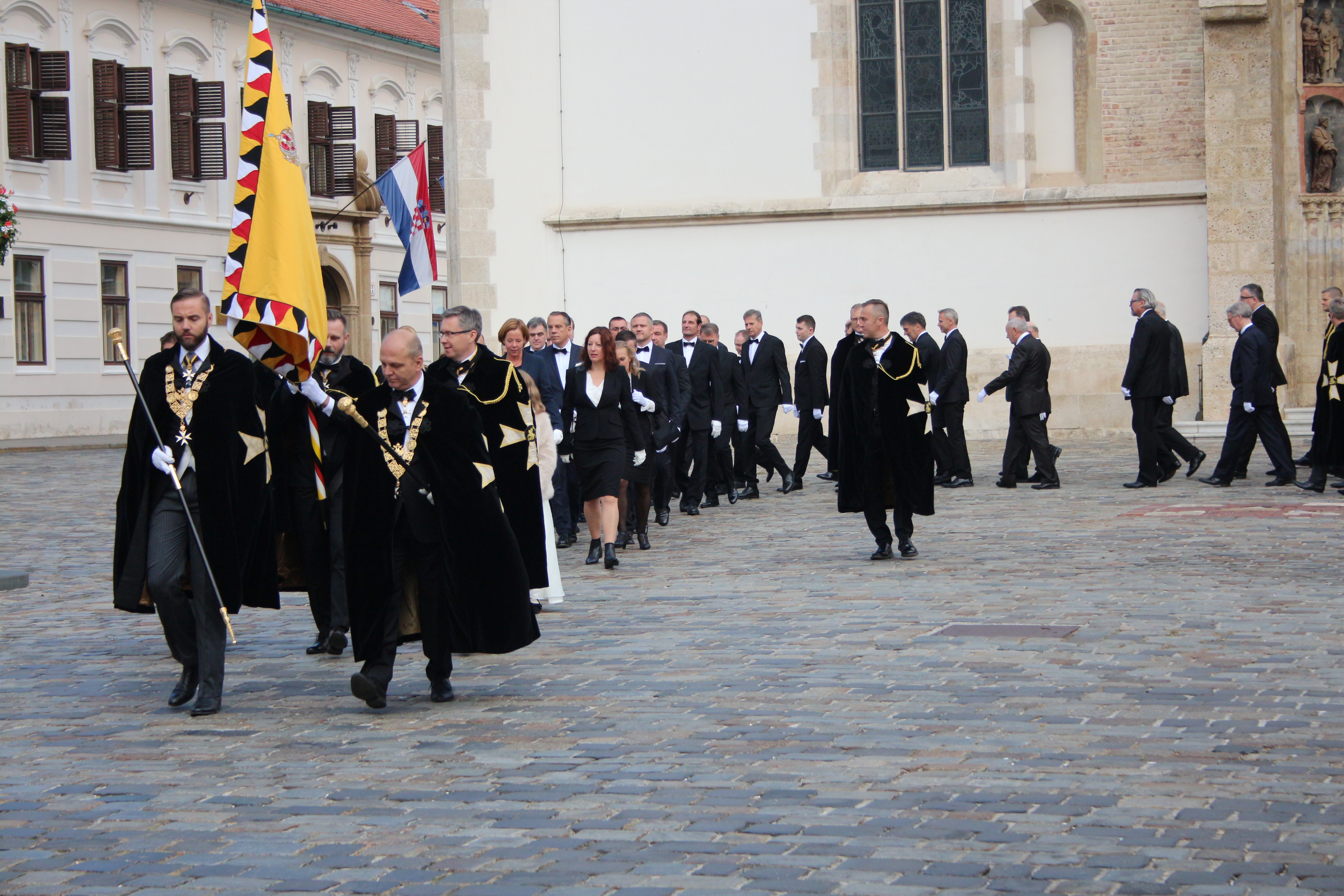
Order of St. George (Habsburg-Lothringen) parade

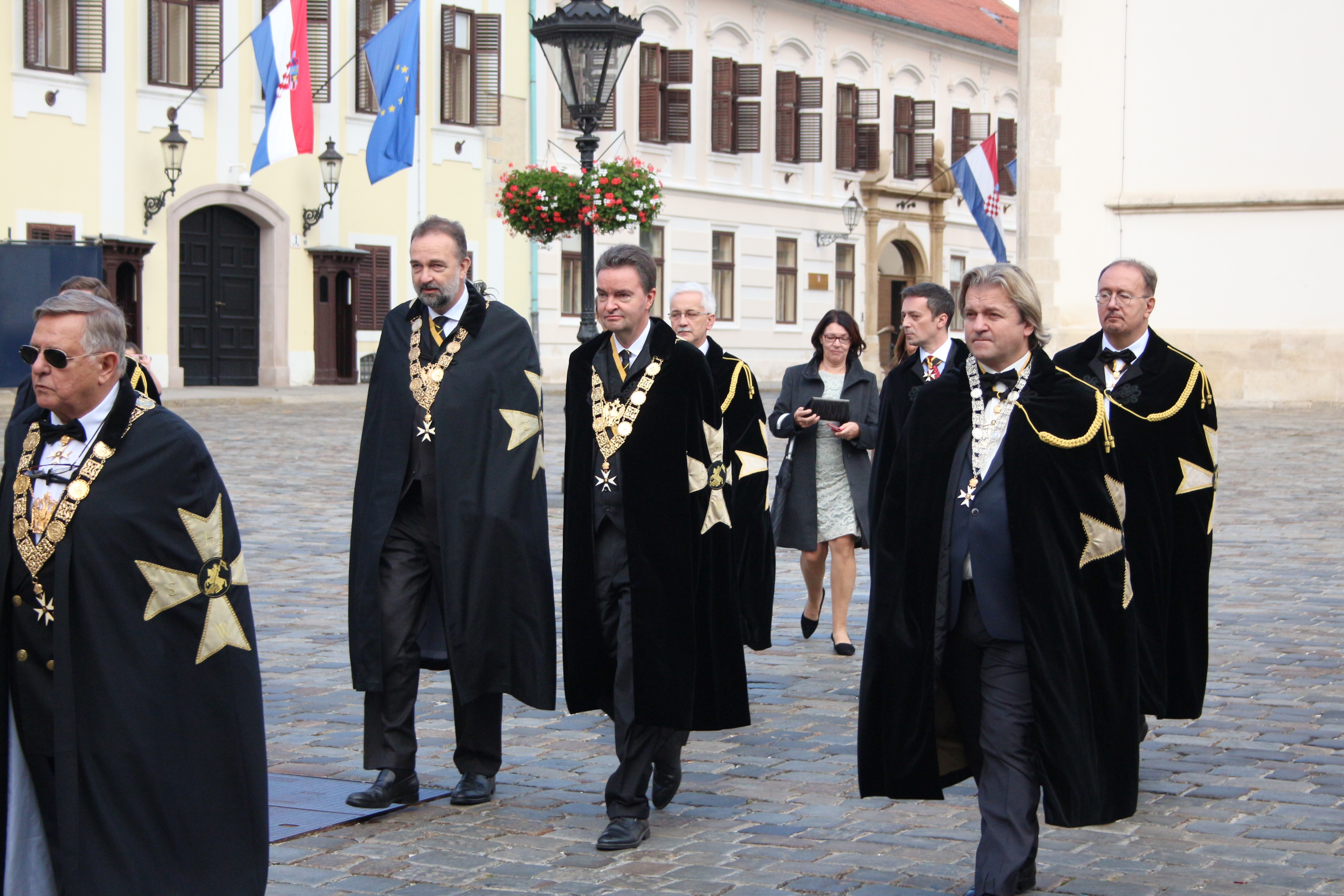
Karl von Habsburg Grand Master of the Order

It is a European and non-partisan order, which supports the transnational idea of Mitteleuropa (Habsburg definition) and increased need for cooperation between the countries of Central and Southeastern Europe. It is committed to Christianity and a united self-confident Europe. The Order of St. George is ecumenical in nature, accepting Christians from various denominations into its ranks. It has approximately 600 imperial knights and Commanderies in Austria, Croatia, Czech Republic, Germany, Hungary, Italy, the Netherlands, Serbia, Slovenia, Switzerland and the United Kingdom. The order represents the centuries-old Habsburg principle of "live and let live" in relation to ethnic groups, peoples, minorities, religions, cultures and languages. The motto of the order is "Viribus Unitis".

== Patron saint ==
The patron saint of the order is Saint George as a symbol of chivalry.

== Principle ==
The order engages in charitable activities. It strives to alleviate or combat the "eightfold misery" in the world: sickness, abandonment, homelessness, hunger, lovelessness, guilt, indifference, and disbelief.

== History ==
=== Early centuries ===
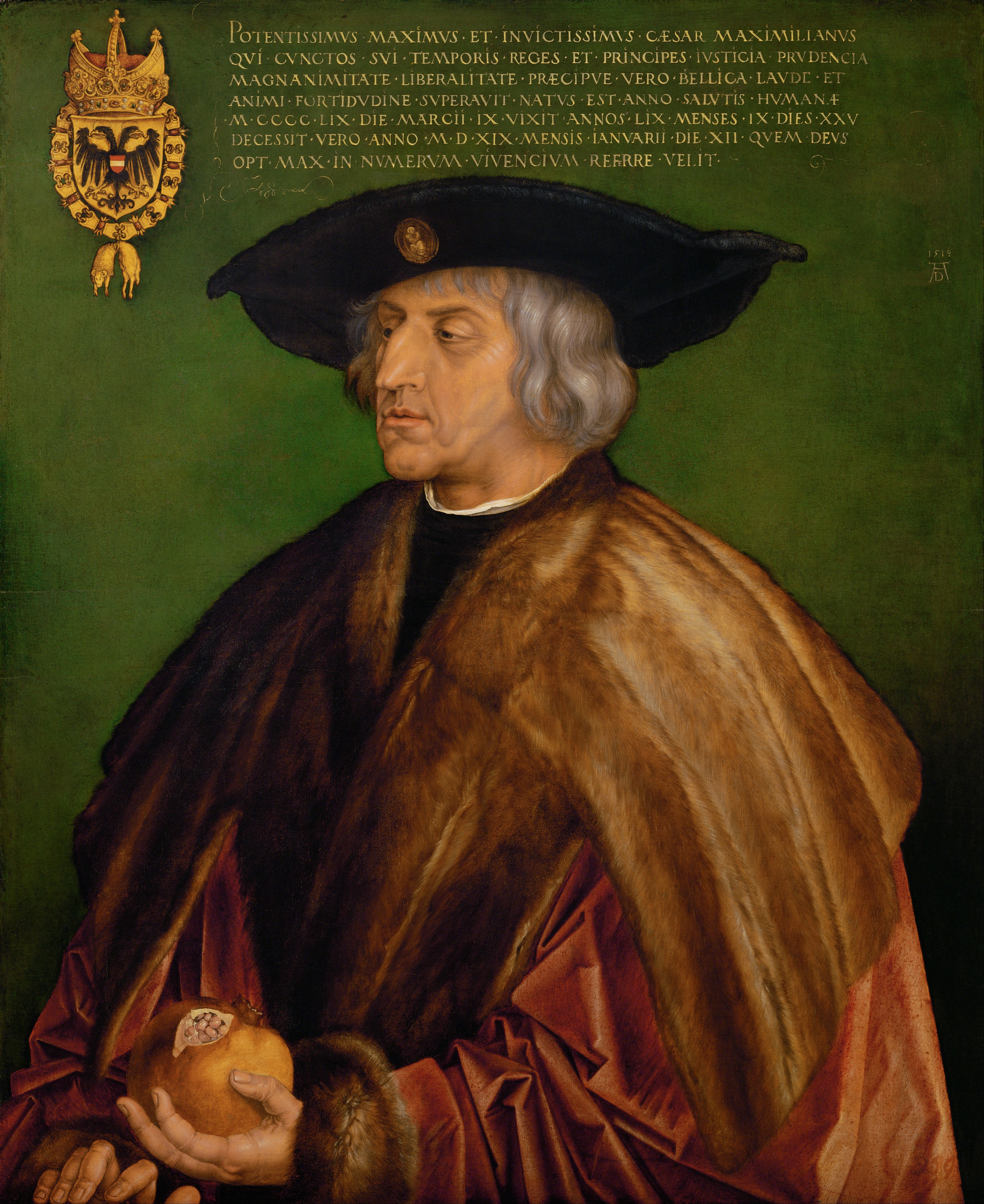
Emperor Maximilian of Habsburg

The origins of today's Order of St. George, a European order of the House of Habsburg-Lorraine, are seen in medieval chivalric orders, not in the sense of an uninterrupted continuity, but in the continuation of an ideal of Christian chivalry.

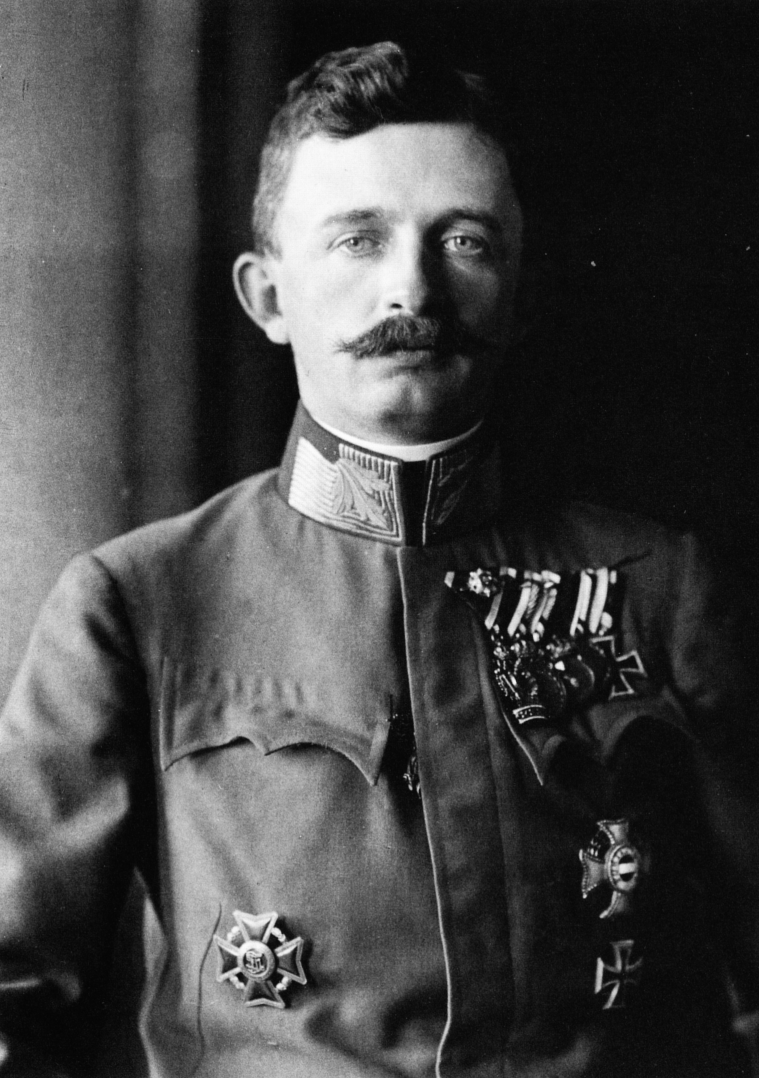
Emperor Charles I of Austria, King of Hungary (as Charles IV, Hungarian: IV. Károly), King of Bohemia.

The order has traditional roots in the Austrian Order of St. George, which was founded by Emperor Friedrich III. of Habsburg and Pope Paul II in Rome in 1469. The headquarters were the former Benedictine monastery Millstatt, the second headquarters was Wiener Neustadt. Emperor Maximilian of Habsburg was a particular patron of the order. It is believed that the Order of St. George by Emperor Friedrich III was connected to another previous order, the Austrian Dragon Society founded in 1409 in Ödenburg, which in turn was directly connected to the Order of the Dragon by the Hungarian King and Emperor Sigismund.

The sovereignty of the Order of St. George or the St. George Knights Brotherhood, which was also founded by Emperor Maximilian I, has remained with the House of Habsburg-Lorraine. Emperor Maximilian I tried to promote his St. George's associations and use them politically. On 15 November 1494, for example, he made an appeal to all Christian kings and princes, as well as to all Christianity, to join the Brotherhood and to support a Turkish campaign planned by the emperor for the following year, but without finding much interest. He gave the knights who would take part in this campaign the privilege of wearing a crown in their coat of arms and thus created the status of the "crowned knight".

=== 20th century ===
In 1923, officers of the Central Powers, the German Empire and Austria-Hungary, which were allied during World War I, founded an association. Their orientation was monarchistic and followed the tradition of the Holy Roman Empire. In 1926, in a reorganization convention in Hanover, the tradition of the former Limburg house order was integrated, especially the reference to the four Luxembourg emperors and their initials in the insignia. In 1927, the statutes were revised to deepen it and the order was given the name "Old Knight Order of St. George called Order of the Four Roman Emperors", with the balles of Wendland, Lower Saxony, Rhineland-Westphalia, southern Germany and Austria-Hungary. Expression of this renewal of the order in spirit was the adoption of St. George in the order. The position of a grand master was left vacant, the administration of the order was held by an order governor.

In 1935, due to the political situation in the German Reich, the seat was moved to Salzburg, from whence it stood against National Socialism, for a Central Europe independent of Nazi Germany and for the re-establishment of the House of Habsburg. In 1938, after the annexation of Austria, the order was banned and dissolved by the Nazis for political reasons. Many who campaigned for Habsburg restoration during the Nazi era were killed, taken to a concentration camp, or persecuted by the Gestapo. Maximilian, Duke of Hohenberg, who represented the expelled Otto von Habsburg in many matters, was taken to the Dachau concentration camp by the National Socialists in 1938. Many of these imperial resistance fighters, such as Heinrich Maier, who successfully passed on production sites and plans for V-2 rockets, Tiger tanks and aircraft to the Allies, or Karl Burian who planned to blow up the Gestapo headquarters in Vienna, were badly tortured and executed.

The House of Habsburg was an early supporter of European integration and a vehement opponent of National Socialism and Communism. During communism, former members of the order or other Habsburg supporters were persecuted behind the Iron Curtain. The Communists and Socialists as well as the USSR were strictly anti-Habsburg because they feared opposition in their countries. The Habsburg family even claims to have played a leading role in the fall of the Iron Curtain.

=== 21st century ===
On 18 January 2008, on behalf of Archduke Otto and his son Archduke Karl, the foundation of the European Order of St. George was celebrated in Munich and a first order chapter was elected.

At the convent on 30 April 2011, Archduke Karl von Habsburg confirmed the Order of St. George – A European order of the House of Habsburg-Lorraine as an order of the House of Habsburg-Lorraine. Building on the centuries-old Habsburg motto "Viribus Unitis", the peoples and nations of Central Europe should now take care of their interests together. In the framework of this Order, the historical connections are to be strengthened and expanded, also in order to be able to perform better in United Europe. The Order sees it as its task to recognize and preserve the common cultural, scientific and interpersonal heritage of Central Europe. The model is the tolerant Habsburg approach to the national diversity of the peoples of Central Europe.

The members of the order should also use those Habsburg roots that extend beyond Central Europe, for example to Italy, Switzerland, Spain, France, Great Britain, Germany, the Benelux countries and the Orient. Accordingly, the Order has a close relationship with the Austrian Pilgrims Hospice to the Holy Family in Jerusalem, which was donated by Emperor Franz Joseph I for all people of the Habsburg Monarchy.

Vinzenz Stimpfl-Abele, procurator of the Order, goes back to Bernhard von Clairvaux to consider the importance of the Order and the knights in the 21st century. On the one hand in their self-image as an elitist Christian protective force and on the other hand in their endeavor to fulfill social tasks. According to Stimpfl-Abele, this also means for Ritter today to confess Christian values with an open visor, to be aware of history and its teachings, to maintain traditions and, in particular, to actively bring about change in order to combat misery. By his definition, values today are the sword and assertiveness the shield of a modern knight.

Regarding the necessary moral attitude of a St. George knight today, Bishop Klaus Küng said during an investiture in Budapest: "When it comes to values that are of great importance to human development, it is necessary to stand up for them courageously. What are these values? – Ultimately, it's Christian values." But that also means that the order in Habsburg tradition is particularly dedicated to the peaceful balance between religions and the intercultural encounter between Christianity, Judaism and Islam.

In addition to local meetings, the order has major events such as in Vienna, Budapest, Prague, Zagreb, Ljubljana, Trieste, Milan, London, Frankfurt, Salzburg, and Tyrol. The band "K.u.k. Regimentskapelle IR4" plays at many events of the order.

According to the order's homepage, members are often well-known personalities, but also people such as Ulrich W. Lipp, the long-standing Habsburg imperial advisor, herald and master of ceremonies, Otto von Habsburg's political assistant Eva Demmerle or Alexander Pachta-Reyhofen, the Chancellor of the Order of the Golden Fleece.

The admission was and is a special privilege and a great honor. Admission to the order of imperial knights takes place by accolade.

When, in early 2026, Karl Habsburg referred to Patriots for Europe as brutal nationalists and Moscow's fifth column, a number of FPOe politicians including Norbert Hofer left the order.

== Notable members ==
=== Knights ===
- (Netherlands) Jan Peter Balkenende
- (Italy) Luis Durnwalder
- (Austria) Werner Fasslabend
- (Italy) Massimiliano Fedriga
- (North Macedonia) Gjorge Ivanov
- (Austria) Karlheinz Kopf
- (United Kingdom) David Mackintosh
- (Italy) Roberto Maroni
- (Austria) Siegfried Nagl
- (Austria) Harald Ofner
- (Bulgaria) Rosen Plevneliev
- (Austria) Erwin Pröll
- (Austria) Josef Pühringer
- (United Kingdom) Lord Robertson of Port Ellen
- (Slovakia) Ľubomír Roman
- (Italy) Luigi Roth
- (Austria) Franz Schausberger
- (Hungary) Zsolt Semjén
- (Austria) Herwig van Staa
- (United Kingdom) Lord Steel of Aikwood
- (Austria) Thomas Stelzer
- (Croatia) Bojan Šober
- (Slovenia) Ludvik Toplak
- (United Kingdom) Lord Watson of Richmond

=== Dames ===
- (Austria) Archduchess Eilika
- (Austria) Archduchess Camilla von Habsburg
- (Austria) Beatrix Karl
- (Hungary) Mária Schmidt
- (Slovenia) Verica Trstenjak

== See also ==
- Accolade
- Imperial Knight
- Military Order of Maria Theresa
- Military order (religious society)
- Nobility
- Order of chivalry
- Order of Franz Joseph
- Order of Leopold
- Order of the Iron Crown
- Ritter (title)
