= Fiona Campbell-Walter =

British fashion model

- Campbell-Walter on a 1963 cover of Town & Country magazine
- Born: Fiona Frances Elaine Campbell-Walter; 25 June 1932 (age 94); Takapuna, Auckland, New Zealand
- Education: Lucie Clayton Charm Academy
- Occupation: Model
- Spouse: Baron Hans Heinrich Thyssen-Bornemisza (m. 1956; div. 1965)
- Children: 2 (including Francesca)
- Parent(s): Keith McNeil Campbell-Walter; Frances Henriette Campbell
- Family: Campbell

Fiona Frances Elaine Campbell-Walter, formerly Baroness Thyssen-Bornemisza de Kászon et Impérfalva, (born 25 June 1932) is a New Zealand-born British model. She had a successful career in the 1950s and was photographed by Henry Clarke and Cecil Beaton. Campbell-Walter was known for her relationship with Greek shipping heir Alexander Onassis, whom she began an affair with after separating from her husband, Baron Hans Heinrich Thyssen-Bornemisza de Kászon et Impérfalva.

== Early life and family ==
Campbell-Walter was born on 25 June 1932 in Takapuna, Auckland to Rear Admiral Keith McNeil Campbell-Walter and Frances Henriette Campbell. She is a member of the Scottish Clan Campbell and a descendant of the Campbell baronets of Airds. Her father was a senior officer in the Royal Navy and an aide-de-camp to George VI and Elizabeth II. Her mother was the eldest daughter of Sir Edward Campbell, 1st Baronet, and was a granddaughter of Arthur John Warren. She is an aunt of Jamie Campbell-Walter.

== Career ==
Campbell-Walter's mother encouraged her to model and, as a teenager, she was photographed by Henry Clarke. She joined the Lucie Clayton Charm Academy, a London-based modelling agency and finishing school. She signed as a model and was a favorite of the photographer Cecil Beaton. In the 1950s she was earning up to £ 2,000 a day. In January 1953 she was featured on the cover of Life Magazine and was featured in Vogue. She was also photographed by John French, Elsbeth Juda, Norman Parkinson, and David Bailey and modelled for Christian Dior, Jacques Fath, and Elsa Schiaparelli.

== Personal life ==
On 17 September 1956 she married Baron Hans Heinrich Thyssen-Bornemisza de Kászon et Impérfalva at Castagnola, a Swiss village on the coast of Lake Lugano. She was the third wife of Thyssen-Bornemisza, a Dutch-born German-Swiss heir and art collector who was a member of the Hungarian nobility. Upon her marriage, she became a baroness, retired from modelling and moved to the Villa Favorita on Lake Lugano. She and her husband had two children:

- Baroness Francesca Thyssen-Bornemisza (born 7 June 1958); married Archduke Karl von Habsburg
- Baron Lorne Thyssen-Bornemisza (born 15 June 1963)

She divorced Thyssen-Bornemisza on 20 January 1965 and moved to London with her children. In 1969 she received media attention for her affair with Greek shipping heir Alexander Onassis, the only son of Aristotle Onassis. Onassis had invited Campbell-Walter, 16 years his senior and a friend of his mother, Athina Mary "Tina" Livanos, to a dinner party.

== Sources ==
- Evans, Peter (1987). Ari: The Life, Times and Women of Aristotle Onassis. London: Penguin. ISBN 978-0-14-009961-4.
