= Tice =

Tice may refer to:

== Geography ==
- Tice, Florida, United States, an unincorporated community and census-designated place
- Tice, Illinois, United States, an unincorporated community
- Tice Creek, California, United States
- Tice (wetlands), wetlands in Slovakia

== People ==
=== Surname ===
- Austin Tice (born 1981), former U.S. Marine Corps officer and kidnapped freelance journalist
- Elena Tice (born 1997), English-born Irish cricketer
- George A. Tice (1938–2025), American photographer
- John Tice (born 1960), American former National Football League player, brother of Mike Tice
- John H. Tice (1809–1883), an American weather forecaster, educator, and author
- Mike Tice (born 1959), American former National Football League player and head coach and current offensive line coach
- Patrick Tice (born 1994), Irish cricketer, brother of Elena Tice
- Richard Tice (born 1964), British MP, property developer, CEO, deputy leader of Reform UK, and former leader of Reform UK
- Rico Tice (born 1966), English Anglican clergyman and writer
- Robbie Tice (born 1990), Canadian soccer and futsal player
- Russ Tice (born 1961), American whistleblower and former intelligence analyst
- Ty Tice (born 1996), American baseball player

=== Given name ===
- Tice Cin (born 1995), British writer and artist
- Tice James (1914–1989), American Negro league baseball shortstop

== Other uses ==
- Tice Grammar School, Tice, Florida, on the National Register of Historic Places

== See also ==
- Tise, a Tibetan freeware utility
- Tise, Maharashtra, India, a village
- Theis (disambiguation)
- Tyce (disambiguation)
