= Tise (disambiguation) =

Tise is a Tibetan input method utility.

Tise or TISE may also refer to:

- TISE, the Time independent Schrödinger equation
- TISE, The International Stock Exchange
- Ellen Tise (born 1961), South African librarian and administrator
- Tise, Maharashtra

== See also ==
- Eduard Tisse (1897–1961), Soviet cinematographer
- Ties (disambiguation)
