= Theiss =

Theiss may refer to:

== Companies ==
- Theiss Aviation, an American aircraft manufacturer
- Konrad Theiss Verlag, a German book publishing company

== People ==
- Brooke Theiss (born 1969), American actress
- Christine Theiss (born 1980), German female world champion in professional full contact kickboxing
- Hans Theiss (born 1977), German politician
- Lewis Edwin Theiss (1880–1963), American journalist and author
- Mike Theiss (born 1978), American photographer
- William Ware Theiss (1930–1992), American costume designer
- Theiss., taxonomic author abbreviation of Ferdinand Theissen (1877–1919), German-Austrian mycologist

== Places ==
- Lake Theiss or Lake Tisza
- Theiss River or Tisza

== See also ==
- Theis (disambiguation)
- Tisza (disambiguation)
- Thiess (disambiguation)
- Theissen (disambiguation)
- Thiessen (disambiguation)
- Tice (disambiguation)
