= Thiess =

Thiess may refer to:

- Thiess (surname)
- Thiess of Kaltenbrun, Livonian werewolf
- Thiess Pty Ltd, an Australian mining services company
  - Thiess Contractors Indonesia, the regional subsidiary of Thiess

== See also ==
- Thies (disambiguation)
- Theiss (disambiguation)
- Thiessen (disambiguation)
- Theissen (disambiguation)
