= Theis =

Theis may refer to:

== People ==
- Charles V. Theis (1900–1987), American hydrogeologist
- Daniel Theis (born 1992), German basketball player
- Frank Gordon Theis (1911–1998), American federal judge
- Geri Theis, American politician
- Jim Theis, author of The Eye of Argon
- Louis Fred Theis or Louis Fred Pfeifer (1876–1949), American Medal of Honor recipient
- Lucy Theis (born 1960), British judge
- Mary Jane Theis (born 1949), American judge
- Phil Theis (born 1958), American professional wrestler
- Roland Theis (born 1980), German politician
- Theis F. Rasmussen (born 1984), Danish football goalkeeper
- Travis Theis, professional American football player in Canada

== Places ==
- Stade Alphonse Theis, football stadium in Luxembourg

== See also ==
- Theiss (disambiguation)
- Tice (disambiguation)
- Thies (disambiguation)
