= Tyce =

Tyce may refer to:

- Roman Týce (born 1977), Czech former footballer
- Harriet Tyce (born 1972), British author
- Brendyn Tyce Carlson (born 1970), American former IndyCar Series driver
- Keith Tyce Diorio (born 1970), American dancer and choreographer

== See also ==
- Tice (disambiguation)
