= Thissen =

Thissen is a surname. Notable people with the surname include:

- David Thissen (born c. 1950), American professor of psychology
- Frans Thissen (1909–?), Belgian rower
- Jean Thissen (born 1946), Belgian footballer
- Karin Thissen (born 1960), German politician
- Paul Thissen (born 1966), American politician
- Tof Thissen (born 1957), Dutch politician
- Werner Thissen (1938–2025), German Roman Catholic archbishop

== See also ==
- Thiessen (disambiguation)
- Thijssen
- Thyssen (disambiguation)
