= Wylie transliteration =

Method for transliterating Tibetan script

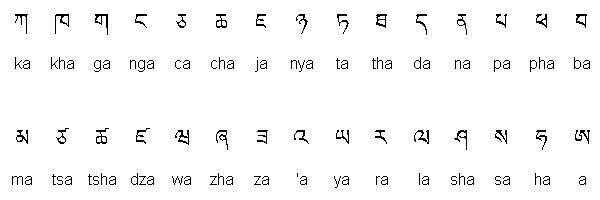
Wylie transliteration of Tibetan script

Wylie transliteration is a method for transliterating Tibetan script using only the letters available on a typical English-language typewriter. The system is named for the American scholar Turrell V. Wylie, who created the system and published it in a 1959 Harvard Journal of Asiatic Studies article. It has subsequently become a standard transliteration scheme in Tibetan studies, especially in the United States.

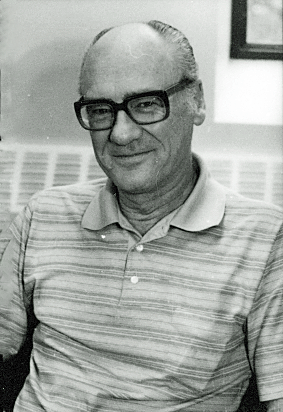
Professor Turrell Wylie in 1979 at the University of Washington, Department of Asian Languages and Literature

Any Tibetan language romanization scheme faces the dilemma of whether it should seek to accurately reproduce the sounds of spoken Tibetan or the spelling of written Tibetan. These differ widely, as Tibetan orthography became fixed in the 11th century, while pronunciation continued to evolve, comparable to the English orthography and French orthography, which reflect late medieval pronunciation.

Previous transcription schemes sought to split the difference with the result that they achieved neither goal perfectly. Wylie transliteration was designed to precisely transcribe Tibetan script as written, which led to its acceptance in academic and historical studies. It is not intended to represent the pronunciation of Tibetan words.

== Consonants ==
The Wylie scheme transliterates the Tibetan characters as follows:

T	W	IPA	T	W	IPA	T	W	IPA	T	W	IPA
ཀ	ka	[ká]	ཁ	kha	[↘︎kʰá]	ག	ga	[ɡà/↗︎kʰà]	ང	nga	[ŋà]
ཅ	ca	[tɕá]	ཆ	cha	[↘︎tɕʰá]	ཇ	ja	[dʑà/↗︎tɕʰà]	ཉ	nya	[ɲà]
ཏ	ta	[tá]	ཐ	tha	[↘︎tʰá]	ད	da	[dà/↗︎tʰà]	ན	na	[nà]
པ	pa	[pá]	ཕ	pha	[↘︎pʰá]	བ	ba	[bà/↗︎pʰà]	མ	ma	[mà]
ཙ	tsa	[tsá]	ཚ	tsha	[↘︎tsʰá]	ཛ	dza	[dzà/↗︎tsʰà]	ཝ	wa	[wà]
ཞ	zha	[ʑà/˦ɕà]	ཟ	za	[zà/↗︎sà]	འ	'a	[ɦà/˦ʔà]	ཡ	ya	[jà]
ར	ra	[rà]	ལ	la	[là]	ཤ	sha	[↘︎ɕá]	ས	sa	[↘︎sá]
ཧ	ha	[há]	ཨ	a	[↘︎ʔá]						

In Tibetan script, consonant clusters within a syllable may be represented through the use of prefixed or suffixed letters or by letters superscripted or subscripted to the root letter (forming a "stack"). The Wylie system does not normally distinguish these as in practice no ambiguity is possible under the rules of Tibetan spelling. The exception is the sequence gy-, which may be written either with a prefix g or a suffix y. In the Wylie system, these are distinguished by inserting a period between a prefix g and initial y. E.g. གྱང "wall" is gyang, while གཡང་ "chasm" is g.yang.

== Vowels ==
The four vowel marks (here applied to the base letter ཨ) are transliterated:

ཨི i	ཨུ u	ཨེ e	ཨོ o

When a syllable has no explicit vowel marking, the letter a is used to represent the default vowel "a" (e.g. ཨ་ = a).

== Capitalization ==
Many previous systems of Tibetan transliteration included internal capitalisation schemes—essentially, capitalising the root letter rather than the first letter of a word, when the first letter is a prefix consonant. Tibetan dictionaries are organized by root letter, and prefixes are often silent, so knowing the root letter gives a better idea of pronunciation. However, these schemes were often applied inconsistently, and usually only when the word would normally be capitalised according to the norms of Latin text (i.e. at the beginning of a sentence). On the grounds that internal capitalisation was overly cumbersome, of limited usefulness in determining pronunciation, and probably superfluous to a reader able to use a Tibetan dictionary, Wylie specified that if a word was to be capitalised, the first letter should be capital, in conformity with Western capitalisation practices. Thus a particular Tibetan Buddhist sect (Kagyu) is capitalised Bka' brgyud and not bKa' brgyud.

== Extensions ==
Wylie's original scheme is not capable of transliterating all Tibetan-script texts. In particular, it has no correspondences for most Tibetan punctuation symbols, and lacks the ability to represent non-Tibetan words written in Tibetan script (Sanskrit and phonetic Chinese are the most common cases). Accordingly, various scholars have adopted ad hoc and incomplete conventions as needed.

The Tibetan and Himalayan Library at the University of Virginia developed the Extended Wylie Transliteration Scheme (EWTS) to address these deficiencies. It uses capital letters and Latin punctuation to represent the missing characters. Several software systems, including Tise, now use this standard to allow one to type unrestricted Tibetan script (including the full Unicode Tibetan character set) on a Latin keyboard.

Since the Wylie system is not intuitive for use by linguists unfamiliar with Tibetan, a new transliteration system based on the International Phonetic Alphabet has been proposed to replace Wylie in articles on Tibetan historical phonology.

== See also ==
- Tibetan pinyin
- Roman Dzongkha
- THL Simplified Phonetic Transcription
- Tise, an extended Wylie input method for Tibetan script
- Tibetan script
- Standard Tibetan
- Uchen script
