= Theissen =

Theissen is a surname, and may refer to many people.

- Gerd Theissen (born 1943), German theologian
- Joel Theissen (born 1986), Australian footballer
- Mario Theissen (born 1952), motorsport director

== See also ==
- Theißen, a village in Saxony-Anhalt, Germany
- Thiessen (disambiguation)
- Theiss (disambiguation)
- Thiess (disambiguation)
