= Thiessen =

Thiessen may refer to:

- Alfred H. Thiessen (1872–1956), American meteorologist
- Brad Thiessen (ice hockey player, born 1986), Canadian ice hockey player
- Bradley Thiessen, American statistician and academic administrator
- Dan Thiessen (1946–2014), college football coach
- Dan Thiessen (politician) (1922–2012), Kansas state legislator
- Del Thiessen, American psychology professor
- Duane D. Thiessen (born 1951), Lieutenant General in US Marine Corps
- Georg Heinrich Thiessen (1914–1961), German astronomer
- Gordon Thiessen (born 1938), Governor of the Bank of Canada from 1994 to 2001
- J. Grant Thiessen (born 1947), Canadian bibliographer and bookseller
- Jack Thiessen (1931–2022), lexicographer
- James Thiessen (born 1974), former Australian rules footballer
- Jayson Thiessen (born 1976), Canadian director
- Juliana Thiessen Day (born 1980), former 1998 Miss Canadian Universe
- Marc Thiessen (born 1967), American author and speech-writer for President George W. Bush
- Matt Thiessen (born 1980), Canadian-American musician
- Nolan Thiessen (born 1980), Canadian curler
- Peter Adolf Thiessen (1899–1990), German physical chemist
- Tiffani Thiessen (born 1974), American actress
- Vern Thiessen (born 1964), Canadian playwright

== Places ==
- Thiessen (crater), a lunar impact crater that lies in the far northern latitudes, on the far side of the Moon. To the west of Thiessen is the younger crater Ricco, and to the south-southwest is Roberts. Further to the east lies Heymans
- Thießen, a village in Saxony-Anhalt, Germany

== See also ==
- Theissen (disambiguation)
- Thiess (disambiguation)
- Theiss (disambiguation)
- Thissen (disambiguation)
- Thyssen (disambiguation)
