= Thiess (surname) =

Thiess is a north German name originating from the given name Matthias. It may refer to

- Dorothea Thiess (1897–1973), German stage, film and television actress
- Frank Thiess (1890–1977), German writer
- Leslie Thiess (1909–1992), Australian construction and mining entrepreneur
- Ursula Thiess (1924–2010), German film actress
