= Thies =

Thies may refer to

- Thiès, a city in Senegal
  - Université de Thiès in Senegal
  - Olympique Thiès, a Senegalese football club
  - Roman Catholic Diocese of Thiès
  - Thiès Department
- Thiès Region in western Senegal
- Thies (name)

== See also ==
- Thiers (disambiguation)
- Thiess (disambiguation)
- Thys
- Thijs
