= Tice (wetlands) =

Coordinates: 48°28′19″N 21°54′57″E

Tice are wetlands, which are the remains of the old bed of the river Tisza in the present-day Latorica Protected Landscape Area (situated along the Latorica River) in Slovakia.

The Tisza flowed 20 thousand years ago. The Tice, along with other territories marked by the Ramsar Convention on Wetlands, constitutes the main part of the Latorica Protected Landscape Area. They feature rare flora and fauna, especially water birds and amphibia.

Subject to special protection are the tice called "Dlhé tice" and "Krátke tice".
