= Tise =

Tibetan input method editor for Windows

- Developer: Grigory Mokhin
- Operating system: Windows XP, Windows Vista, Windows 7
- Type: Input method for Tibetan
- License: Freeware
- Website: tise.mokhin.org

Tise (pronounced tee-say) is a Tibetan input method utility for Windows XP, Windows Vista and Windows 7 created by Grigory Mokhin. The name of the program refers to the native name of Mount Kailash in Tibet.

Tise enables users to enter Unicode Tibetan script text into Windows applications by typing transliterated (romanized) Tibetan. Tise intercepts the user input and converts the typed transliterated sequences into the Unicode character code sequences for the corresponding Tibetan text, which may be displayed using any Unicode OpenType Tibetan script font.

The Tise utility uses the Extended Wylie Transliteration Scheme (EWTS), which was developed by the Tibetan and Himalayan Digital Library (THDL) as an enhancement of the standard Wylie transliteration system for Tibetan. This input method is most popular with users already familiar with the Wylie transliteration system and keyboard layouts for typing English and other west European languages.

Tise was developed in line with the aims of the THDL tools project with the sole purpose to assist the preservation of Tibetan cultural heritage and to make using a computer easier for Himalayan peoples and scholars.

For Linux and other for POSIX-style operating systems, there is an EWTS-based Tibetan input method available for the Smart Common Input Method (SCIM) platform, and multilingualization modules that can be used in more modern engines, like iBus and Fcitx.
