= Tise, Maharashtra =

Village in Maharashtra

Tise, Maharashtra is a small village in Raigad district, Maharashtra state in Western India. The 2011 Census of India recorded a total of 795 residents in the village. Tise, Maharashtra's geographical area is 559 hectares (1,380 acres).

Tise Kh. is a small village in the same region. The 2011 Census of India recorded a total of 389 residents in the village. Tise, Maharashtra's geographical area is approximately 50 hectares (120 acres).
