= Lewis Edwin Theiss =

American journalist and author (1880–1963)

Lewis Edwin Theiss (1880 – May 22, 1963) was a freelance writer for national magazines, professor of journalism at Bucknell University, and an author of adventure books for boys.

== Biography ==
Cover of In Camp at Fort Brady, a 1914 novel by Lewis E. Theiss

Theiss graduated from Bucknell University in 1902, and worked as a reporter for the New York Sun for 10 years before leaving to focus on freelance writing. He wrote for The Saturday Evening Post, Ladies' Home Journal, McCall's, and Woman's Home Companion, among many other national magazines. Around 1918, the Boston publisher W. A. Wilde & Company encouraged Theiss to write books for boys, of which he eventually wrote 44.

In 1924, Bucknell University awarded Theiss an honorary degree as Doctor of Literature and he joined the faculty as a Professor of Journalism. In 1942, he was asked to write a history of the university, published as "Centennial History of Bucknell University: 1846–1946", which took him four years. Upon completion of this work in 1946, he retired from Bucknell University.

Theiss was involved in the Boy Scouts of America, serving as president of the Susquehanna Valley Area Council around 1937.

Theiss died at the age of 84 on May 22, 1963 in Evangelical Community Hospital in Lewisburg, Pennsylvania.

== Selected works ==
- (1914) In Camp at Fort Brady
- (1915) His Big Brother; a story of the struggles and triumphs of a little "son of liberty"
- (1917) The Wireless Patrol at Camp Brady
- (1918) A Champion of the Foothills
- (1918) The Secret Wireless
- (1919) The Hidden Aerial: the Spy Line on the Mountain
- (1920) The Young Wireless Operator—Afloat
- (1921) The Young Wireless Operator—As a Fire Patrol
- (1922) The Young Wireless Operator—With the Oyster Fleet; how Alec Cunningham won his way to the top in the oyster business
- (1923) The Young Wireless Operator—With the U.S. Secret Service: Winning his Way in the Secret Service
- (1924) The Young Wireless Operator—With the U. S. Coast guard
- (1925) The Flume in the Mountains; the Story of the Building of a Great Power Plant
- (1927) Piloting the U.S. Air Mail; flying for Uncle Sam
- (1927) Keepers of the Sea: the Story of the United States Lighthouse Service
- (1928) The Search For The Lost Mail Plane
- (1929) Trailing the Air Mail Bandit
- (1931) The Pursuit of the Flying Smugglers
- (1932) Wings of the Coast Guard; aloft with the Flying Service of Uncle Sam’s Life Savers
- (1933) Flying the U.S. Mail to South America; how Pan American Airships Carry On in Sun and Storm Above the Rolling Caribbean
- (1934) The Mail Pilot of the Caribbean
- (1935) The Flying Explorer: How a Mail Plane Penetrated the Basin of the Amazon
- (1936) Guardians of the Sea
- (1936) A Journey through Pennsylvania Farmlands
- (1936) From Coast to Coast with the U.S. Air Mail
- (1937) Flood Mappers Aloft: How Ginger Hale and the Scouts of the Bald Eagle Patrol Surveyed the Watershed of the Susquehanna
- (1938) A Journey Through Pennsylvania Farmlands Volume II
- (1938) Wings over the Pacific
- (1939) Wings over the Andes
- (1940) On board a U. S. submarine
- (1941) Flying with the C.A.A.; how two of Uncle Sam’s Youngest Airmen Saved a Great Defense Plant From Sabotage
- (1942) Flying for Uncle Sam; A story of Civilian Pilot Training
- (1943) Tommy Visits An Aircraft Factory
- (1943) Flying With the Coastal Patrol
- (1944) Overseas With the Air Transport Command
- (1945) Sky Road to Adventure
- (1946) Flying With the Air-sea Rescue Service
- (1946) Centinennial History of Bucknell University, 1946-1946
- (1952) With Young Bruce on the Frontier: A Story of General Sullivan’s Expedition
- (1955) Lives of Danger and Daring
