= Bromley by-election =

Bromley by-election may refer to:

- 1919 Bromley by-election
- 1930 Bromley by-election
- 1945 Bromley by-election

== See also ==
- 2006 Bromley and Chislehurst by-election
