= Forster Memorial Park =

Park in London Borough of Lewisham, United Kingdom

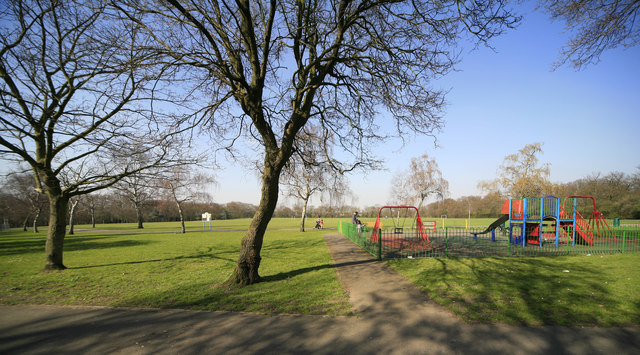
- Forster Memorial Park contains a pocket of ancient woodland, grass, flower beds and playgrounds.
- Interactive map of Forster Memorial Park
- Type: public park
- Location: London, England
- Coordinates: 51°25′49″N 0°00′17″W
- Area: 17 hectares (42 acres)
- Created: 1922
- Operator: London Borough of Lewisham
- Open: 8am-sunset
- Status: Open year round
- Website: lewisham.gov.uk

Forster Memorial Park, is a public park in London Borough of Lewisham. It takes up the land between Bellingham Road and Whitefoot Lane, Catford – the park and surrounding roads form Southend or Southend Village. The nearest stations are Bellingham and Beckenham Hill.

== History of the park ==
The land where the park now stands was donated by H.W. Forster, first MP for Bromley and later Governor-General of Australia. The Forster family had lived at Southend Hall from the early 19th century (now demolished, but located near the junction of Bromley Road and Whitefoot Lane) and had a large estate covering what was then a rural outpost of London in the county of Kent. The land for the park was donated in memory of H.W. Forster’s two sons, Alfred and John Forster, who died in World War I, and was formally opened by his daughter in 1922.

The park was expanded again in 1937, when further land to the north was bought from the Forster Estate Company.

== Layout and notable features ==
The park, which is accessed from Whitefoot Lane, extends to 17 hectares (42 acres) and is unusual for an urbanised area in that its central area of open grassland is surrounded by relict ancient woodland. This wood includes ash, hornbeam and oak trees. The woodland’s shrub layer has been found to include some wild service tree, a rare species in the UK that is almost exclusively found in ancient woods and hedgerows. The area has been managed since 1999 by the borough’s environmental taskforce. Their work includes removal of invasive species, such as sycamore, and restoration of a more natural landscape.

The park includes a children’s play area, BMX track, cycle route and cycling proficiency area and a football pitch.

There is an active Friends of Forster Memorial Park.

== See also ==
- Excalibur Estate

== External sources ==
- History of Southend Village, including historic maps
- Nature conservation report from Lewisham Borough Council
