= Statue of Romulus and Remus, Beechbarrow =

Statue of Romulus and Remus in Beechbarrow, England

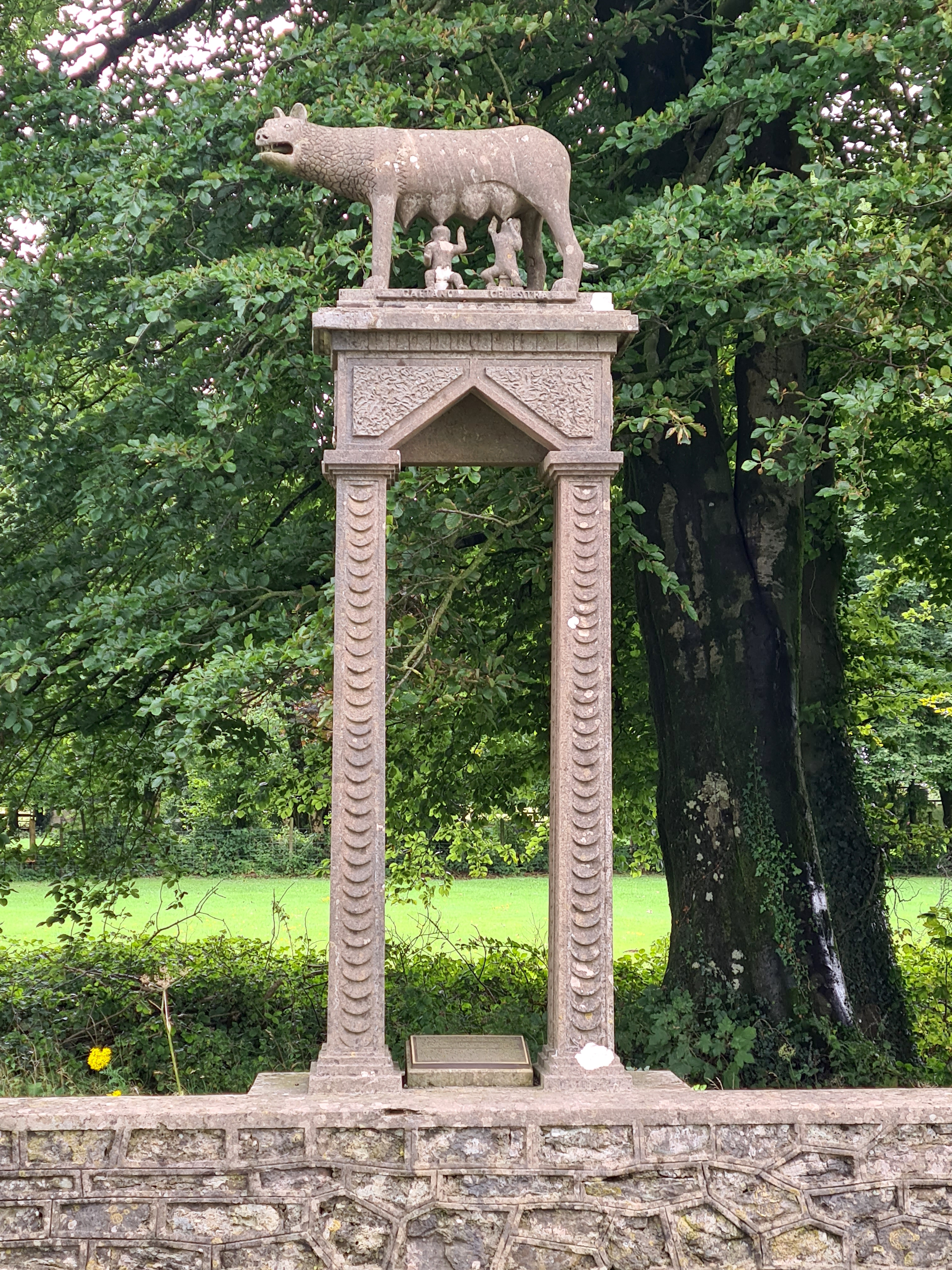
- The statue standing behind a low stone wall
- Artist: Gaétano Claudio Celestra
- Year: 1946 (80 years ago)
- Medium: Concrete and plaster over an iron armature
- Movement: Neoclassical folly
- Subject: Romulus and Remus
- Dimensions: Height 4 metres (12 feet)
- Location: Beechbarrow, Hillgrove, Pen Hill, Wells St Cuthbert Out, Somerset, England; 51.238521°N 2.617310°W

Listed Building – Grade II
- Official name: Statue of Romulus and Remus on land at Beechbarrow House
- Designated: 21 February 2008 (18 years ago)
- Reference no.: 1392416
- SHER (Note: Somerset Historic Environment Record.): 24437

The statue of Romulus and Remus is a Grade II listed folly located at Beechbarrow on Pen Hill, by the A39 road to Wells, Somerset, England. It was designed and sculpted by a former Italian prisoner of war (POW) and is made from concrete and plaster over an iron armature. It depicts the legend of Romulus and Remus, twin sons of Mars, suckling the she‑wolf, and is supported on a plinth by four pillars.

== History ==
In 1946, Gaétano Claudio Celestra, commonly known as Gaetano Celestra, worked for Philip Robert Wellstood White at the Beechbarrow estate on Pen Hill in Hillgrove, Wells St Cuthbert Out, Somerset. (Note: Beechbarrow is sometimes spelled Beech Barrow.) Celestra, was a former Italian POW, who had been held at various POW camps in Wells during World War II. In the summer of 1946, Wellstood White asked Celestra to repair a stone wall that ran along the main Bristol to Wells road, now the A39 road, close to the Mendip transmitting station on Pen Hill. A stray bomb, dropped during the Bristol Blitz, had destroyed the wall and created a deep crater in the field behind the wall.

Celestra spent three months repairing half a mile (0.8 kilometres) of wall, and subsequently, he asked Wellstood White if he could design and erect a sculpture to express his gratitude to him, and other local people, who had helped him during the war. He worked in his spare time, in one of the Beechbarrow outhouses, to create a sculpture of Romulus and Remus and the she‑wolf. He erected the statue, supported on a plinth by four pillars, directly in front of the bomb crater.

By 1978, the statue had started to show signs of age; the concrete tail had crumbled, revealing part of the armature, and one of the figures had lost an arm. (Note: In its time, the hollow statue has provided protection for nesting birds and several swarms of honey bees.) In 2002, Ian Rands, vice‑chairman of the Glastonbury Conservation Society, observed that the statue was in need of urgent repair. He contacted D'Ovidio Brothers, a local building company, to quote for the work, but the society was not able to provide the necessary funds. Despite the issue with funding, D'Ovidio Brothers decided to carry out the restoration and look at other ways to raise the money.

In 2002, the Festa Italiana Romulus and Remus, also known as the Wells Italian Festival, was held for the first time at Beechbarrow. Around £3,000 was raised, enough to cover the costs of restoring the statue and to donate to other charities. In June 2003, following the restoration of the statue, a brass commemorative plaque was installed on the base by the local Italian community. The festival was held at Beechbarrow until 2017, when it moved to its new site at Palace Farm, Wells, near the Bishop's Palace.

In 2007, Ian Gething, conservation officer for Mendip District Council, applied to English Heritage for special protection for the statue. It was argued, amongst other reasons put forward to protect the statue, that it celebrated the bond between POWs and the local community, and that it demonstrated that concrete can be an imaginative and attractive medium. On 21 February 2008, the statue was Grade II listed by English Heritage.

The statue was given prominence in an exhibition at the Wells and Mendip Museum, entitled The Italians of Wells, that ran to 31 August 2024. It featured in the television documentary series Cobblestones, Cottages and Castles, that was produced by Young Productions, and first broadcast on Television South West in October 1990. The statue was also included in the television programme The Sculpture 100, that surveyed the hundred most significant public sculptures in Britain created in the last hundred years. The programme was first broadcast on 4 December 2005 by Artsworld, now Sky Arts, and is available on DVD.

== Design ==
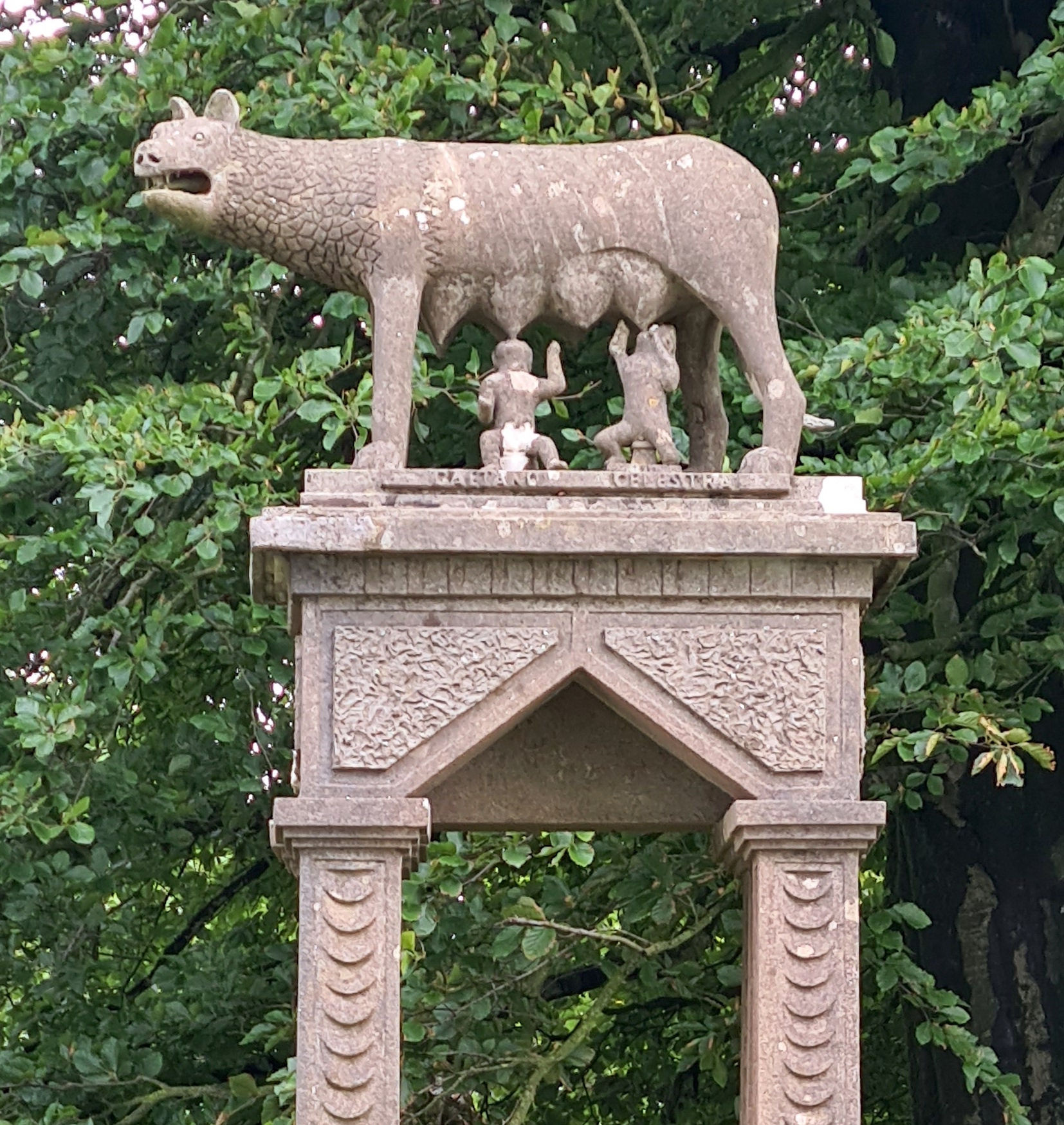
Design elements

1	She‑wolf fashioned from concrete and plaster over an iron armature
2	Romulus and Remus suckling from the she‑wolf
3	Name of artist (Gaetano Celestra)
4	Rectangular plinth
5	Decorative panels of vermiculation
6	Square columns
7	Raised semi‑circular motifs

Celestra's design was influenced by an image of the Capitoline Wolf on the reverse of a 50 lira note. Ultimately, this design was derived from an Etruscan bronze sculpture of the Capitoline Wolf, that depicts a scene from the legend of the founding of Rome, and dates to around the 5th century BC.

The inscription on the brass commemorative plaque reads:

During the Second World War there were Italian prisoners of war in camp close to this site. Towards the end of the war many of these men were allowed to work on local farms. Some were selected to live in at the farms and many became part of the family.

One of the prisoners, an artist named Gaetano Celestra with the help of his colleagues designed and sculpted this statue of Romulus, Remus and the wolf in appreciation of the kindness shown to them during their forced stay in this country.

According to legend Romulus and Remus were the twin sons of Mars, the God of War, and Vestal Virgin Rhea Silvia. Amulius, the king, had the babes placed in a trough and cast into the River Tiber. They drifted ashore and were rescued by a female wolf who suckled, fed and protected them until Faustulus, a shepherd, and his wife found them and raised them into adulthood. Romulus and Remus both had plans to build a city but had such a violent disagreement about who should be king that Romulus killed Remus. Romulus built the city which he ruled as king for forty years.

That city is Rome — founded in 753 BC.

== About the artist ==
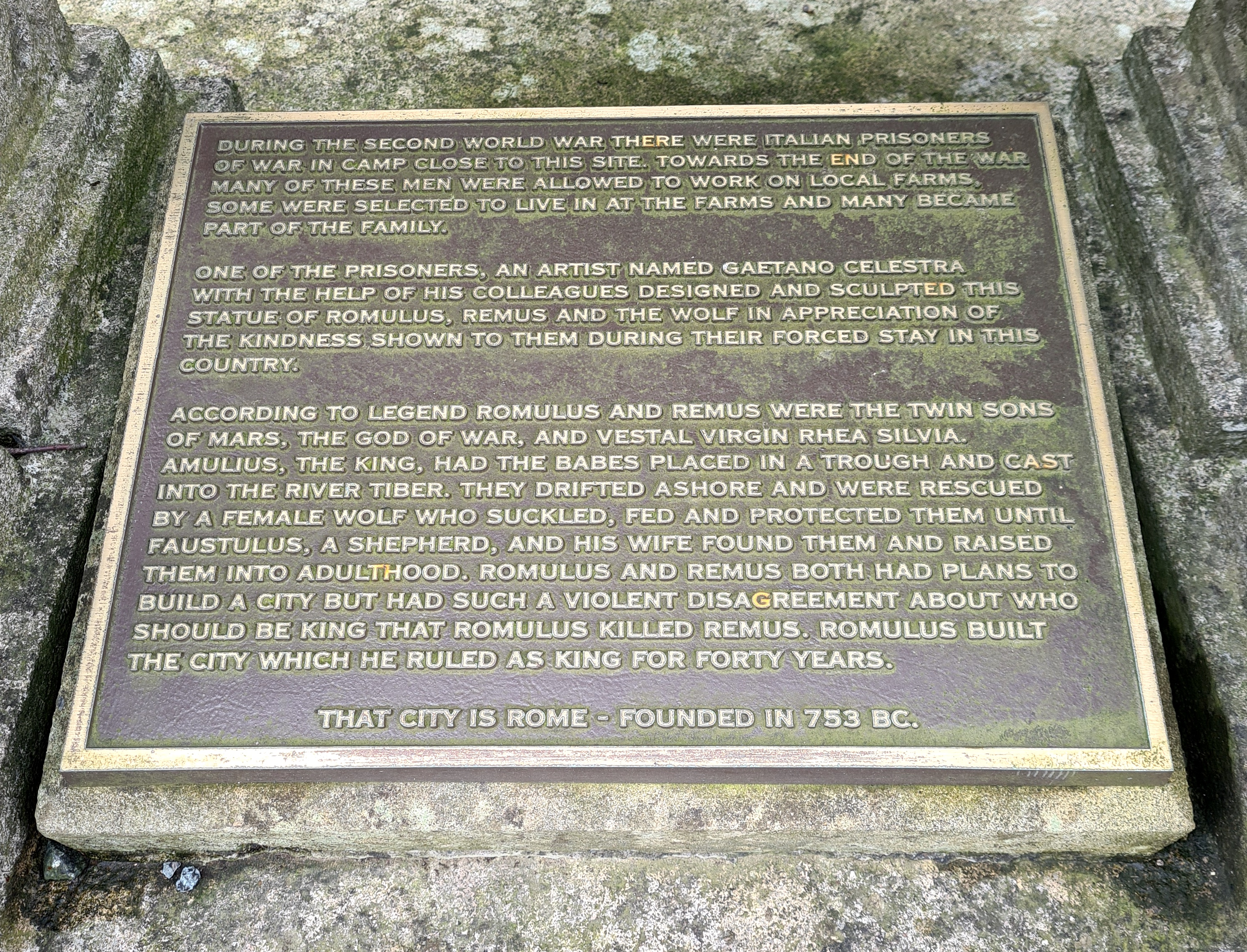
The brass commemorative plaque that was installed on the base of the statue in 2003

Celestra was born on 5 June 1908 in Tunis, Tunisia, to Vito Celestra and Angela, née Termini. (Note: Celestra's mother's birth name was sometimes spelled Termine.) He was baptised at Notre‑Dame‑du‑Rosaire (the Catholic Church of Our Lady of the Rosary) in Tunis. His father, of Italian Tunisian descent, worked as a mechanic in the Tunis suburb of Radès. In 1932, Celestra married Maria D'Affronto at the Church of Our Lady of the Rosary, and they went on to have three daughters. Before World War II, he worked in Tunis as a stonemason and builder, and following Italy's entry into the war in June 1940, he enlisted in the Italian Army. However, after the British capture of Tobruk in January 1941, he was taken a POW.

In early 1941, the transfer of Italian POWs to the United Kingdom was being considered by the government as a way to ease a shortage of labour in farming. In July 1941, the first contingents of POWs arrived in the United Kingdom, to be held in purpose-built camps. It is thought that Celestra was brought over in 1943, and held initially at Penleigh Camp near Wookey Hole, Somerset. He was one of a thousand Italian prisoners interned at the camp, before he was transferred to Stoberry Park camp in Wells, Somerset. Following Italy's defeat in September 1943, many of the POWs were given a degree of freedom to work on farms and visit pubs and other events in the area. After the Normandy landings in June 1944, Stoberry Park became a camp for German POWs.

By 1946, Celestra was living with the Wellstood White family at the Beechbarrow estate on Pen Hill in Hillgrove, Wells St Cuthbert Out. Philip Robert Wellstood White had been a livestock officer for the Ministry of Agriculture, Fisheries and Food (MAFF), until he resigned his position in 1945. In the following year, Wellstood White started a business from Beechbarrow called Universal Supplies Association, that traded a variety of goods to retail and wholesale customers. In 1951, Wellstood White closed the business, and in January 1952, the family emigrated to Paarl, near Cape Town, South Africa.

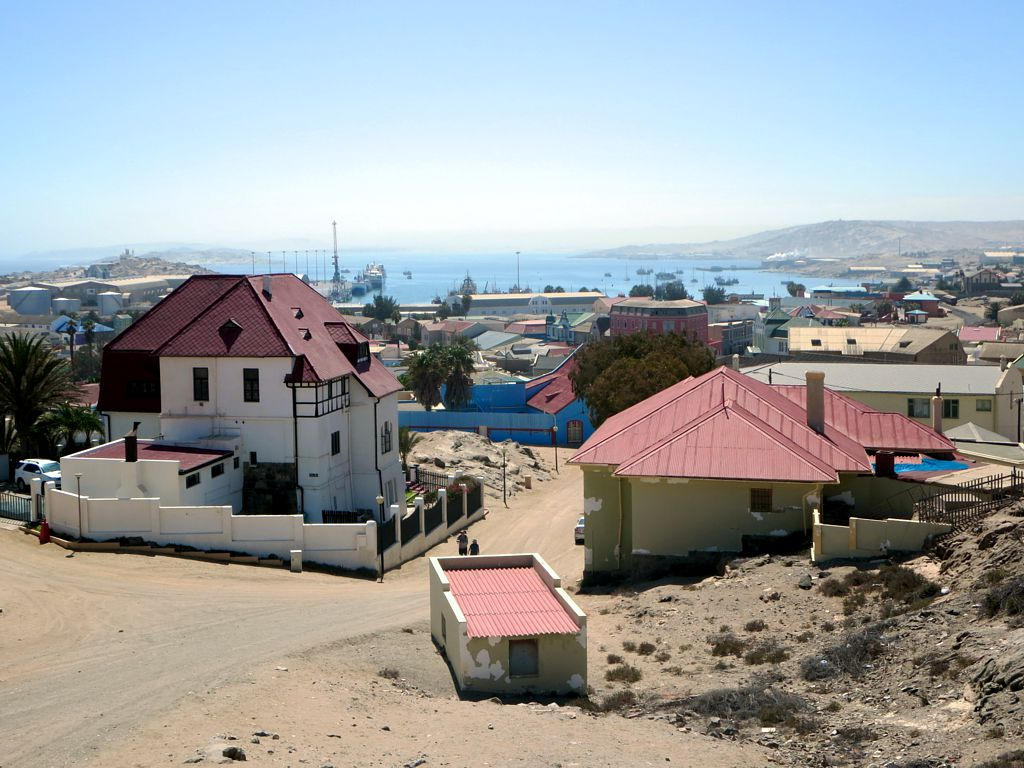
Celestra lived and worked at Lüderitz until his death in 1987

Celestra decided to remain in the United Kingdom after he discovered that Maria had left him for another man. By March 1952, he was working for the Waldegrave estate at Chewton Mendip, Somerset. In the same month, he applied to become a naturalised British citizen, after he had stated that his one ambition was "to become a naturalised Englishman." He worked on contract at a number of other farms, notably for the Cristofoli family at Lower Farm in Batcombe, Somerset, where he built two snake decorated fish ponds. Other examples of his work still survive, including the bus shelter opposite the George Inn in Croscombe, Somerset, and another fish pond at Beechbarrow. (Note: The bus shelter in Croscombe was financed by public subscription, and in May 1951, the first foundation was laid. At the time, local councils were encouraged to erect bus shelters as a way of celebrating the Festival of Britain that was held in summer of that year. The bus shelter scheme was popular with councils, as it was inexpensive and would not deplete building supplies that would stay on ration until 1954.)

By 1954, Celestra was working for Giuseppe "Joe" Ambrosini, a builder based in Ash Grove, Wells, who himself was a former POW. Celestra has been described as a "quiet loner" and a "short curly‑haired Italian", but one day he asked Ambrosini if he could have the afternoon off to get married. Unfortunately, his bride changed her mind at the register office and decided not to go ahead with the wedding. (Note: Celestra remained married to Maria, until his death in 1987.) He worked next for Onorino Crestani, another Italian ex‑POW and builder, before a short spell of maintenance work at St Cuthberts Mill in Haybridge, Wells.

In early 1955, Celestra decided to follow the Wellstood Whites to South Africa. Wellstood White found him a job on a farm but he left after a few years to work as a builder and fisherman in the coastal town of Lüderitz in the ǁKaras Region of southern Namibia. He built another Capitoline Wolf sculpture at his home in Lüderitz. A photograph appears in the 19 September 1987 edition of Le Figaro Magazine, that shows him, and his gardener, repainting the sculpture. (Note: The sculpture is located at 26°39′05″S 15°09′21″E, on Bay Road, the B4 road in Lüderitz, across from Stauch Road. See the photograph of the Capitoline Wolf sculpture that Celestra built at his home in Lüderitz in the external links section.) He died on 16 September 1987 (aged 79) at Lüderitz, three days before the photograph was published. Maria was appointed executor for his estate.

== See also ==
- Excalibur Estate, London (built by Italian and German POWs)
- Italian Chapel, Orkney (built by Italian POWs)
- Italians in the United Kingdom
- List of Capitoline Wolf statues
- List of public art in Somerset

== Footnotes ==
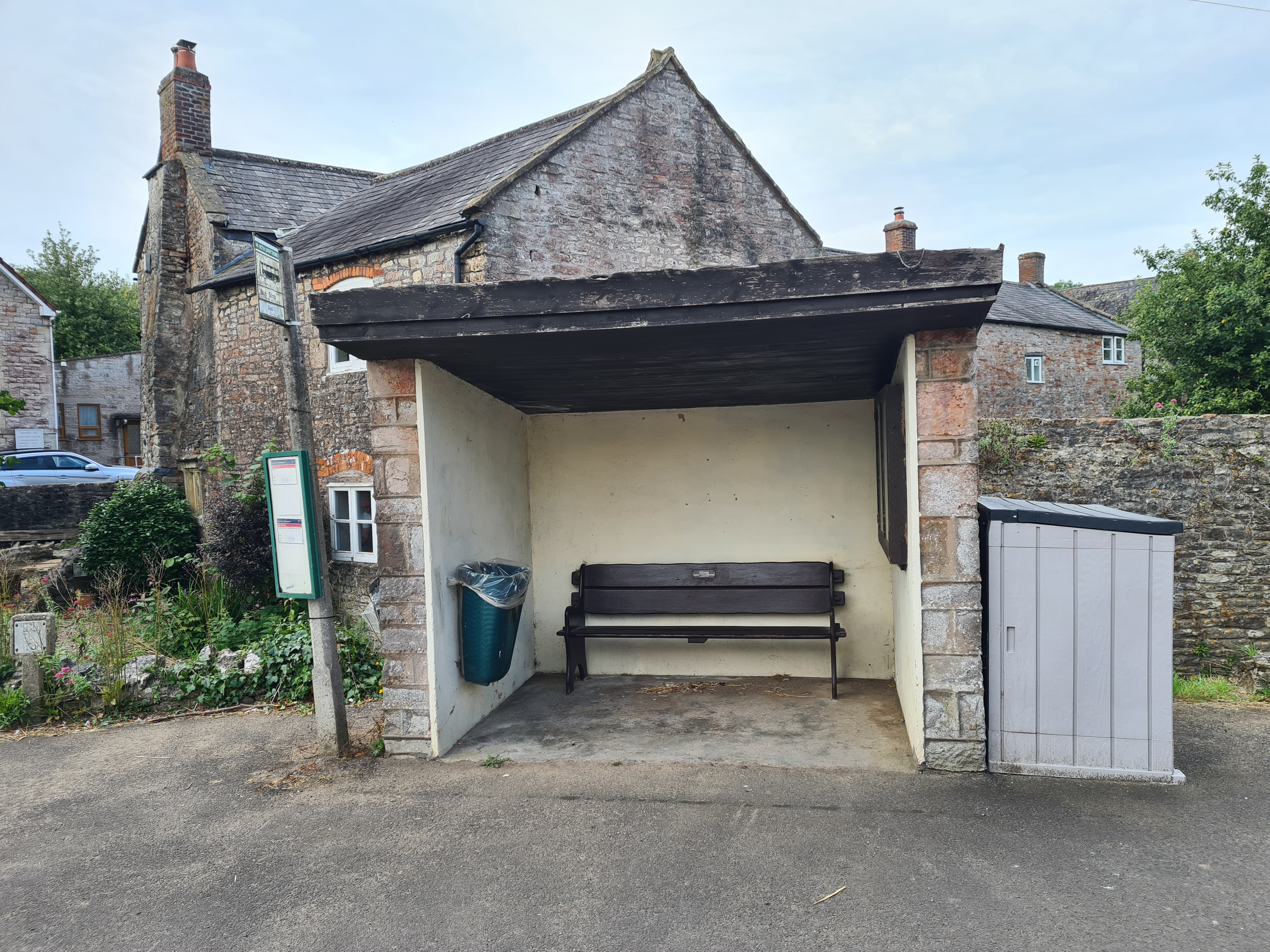
The bus shelter at Croscombe
