= List of public art in Somerset =

Districts of Somerset
All unitary authorities

1 Somerset
2 North Somerset
3 Bath and North East Somerset

This is a list of public art in the Somerset county of England. This list applies only to works of public art on permanent display in an outdoor public space. For example, this does not include artworks in museums.

The ceremonial county of Somerset consists of three unitary authorities, Somerset (administered by Somerset Council), North Somerset and Bath and North East Somerset.

Public art is art in any media that has been planned and executed with the intention of being staged in the physical public domain, usually outside and accessible to all. Public art is significant within the art world, amongst curators, commissioning bodies and practitioners of public art, to whom it signifies a working practice of site specificity, community involvement and collaboration. Public art may include any art which is exhibited in a public space including publicly accessible buildings, but often it is not that simple. Rather, the relationship between the content and audience, what the art is saying and to whom, is just as important if not more important than its physical location.

== Bath and North East Somerset ==
Bath and North East Somerset (commonly referred to as BANES or B&NES) is a unitary authority created on 1 April 1996, following the abolition of the County of Avon. It occupies an area of 220 square miles (570 km^{2}), two-thirds of which is green belt. BANES stretches from the outskirts of Bristol, south into the Mendip Hills and east to the southern Cotswold Hills and Wiltshire border. The city of Bath is the principal settlement in the district, but BANES also covers Keynsham, Midsomer Norton, Radstock and the Chew Valley. BANES has a population of 170,000, about half of whom live in Bath, making it 12 times more densely populated than the rest of the district.

Image	Title / subject	Location and coordinates	Date	Artist / designer	Type	Material	Dimensions	Designation	Owner / administrator	Wikidata	Notes
More images	Sir Bevil Grenville's Monument	Lansdown Hill 51.431389°N 2.399444°W	1720			Ashlar stone masonry,	25 feet (8 m) high.	Grade II* listed building, scheduled monument		Q7526126	
More images	Frederick, Prince of Wales	Queen Square, Bath	1738	John Wood, the Elder	Obelisk	Stone	15m tall	Grade II* listed building			Shortened after a gale in 1815.
More images	Queen Victoria Jubilee Obelisk	Royal Victoria Park, Bath 51.3862°N 2.3731°W	1837	G.P. Manners (architect)	Obelisk	Stone		Grade II*		Q1752215	
More images	Edward VII	Parade Gardens, Bath	c.1911	Newbury Abbot Trent	Statue on pedestal	Bronze & Portland stone		Grade II		Q26673296	
	Jupiter	Royal Victoria Park, Bath 51.3862°N 2.3731°W	1839	John Osborne		Bath Stone	Head 183 centimetres (72 in) high. Base and pedestal 600 centimetres (240 in) high.				
	Memorial to the 1968 flood	By the River Chew in Woollard 51.3784°N 2.5298°W				Stone, from destroyed bridge and plaque					
	Sham Castle	Bathampton 51.3825°N 2.3375°W	1755	Sanderson Miller		Stone		Grade II* listed building		Q7487351	
	Medici lions	Royal Victoria Park, Bath 51.3843°N 2.3646°W									
More images	Rebecca Fountain	Beside Bath Abbey	1859, erected 1861	Rushton Walker of Bristol	Sculpture and fountain	Stone and marble		Grade II		Q26674838	
More images	Queen Victoria	Exterior of Victoria Art Gallery, Bath	c.1897	Andrea Carlo Lucchesi	Sculpture and surround	Stone					
	Fossil Tree milepost on National Cycle Route 24	Near Radstock 51.2972°N 2.4247°W		John Mills							
	Somerset coalfield	Radstock 51.2936°N 2.4485°W									

== North Somerset ==
North Somerset is a unitary authority which is administered independently of the non-metropolitan county of Somerset. Its administrative headquarters are located in the town hall of Weston-super-Mare, and has a resident population of 193,000 living in 85,000 households.

Image	Title / subject	Location and coordinates	Date	Artist / designer	Type	Material	Dimensions	Designation	Owner / administrator	Wikidata	Notes
More images	War memorial	Grove Park, Weston-super-Mare	1922	Alfred Drury	Statue on pedestal	Bronze and stone		Grade II		Q26677665	
More images	Silica	Big Lamp Junction, Weston-super-Mare 51.3471°N 2.9761°W	2006	Wolfgang Buttress			4 metres (13 ft) wide at the base. 30 metres (98 ft) high.		North Somerset Council		Lit by LEDs at night
More images	The Glassblower	Nailsea 51.4342°N 2.7540°W	2008	Vanessa Marston		Bronze			Nailsea Town Council		
	Seafarer's Memorial	Portishead 51.4947°N 2.7733°W	2005			Stone					
	Carved head	Leigh Woods 51.4464°N 2.6549°W				Stone					
	Full Fathom Five	Portishead 51.4915°N 2.7543°W		Michael Dan Archer		Stone					108 granite columns

== Somerset (district) ==
A new unitary authority, Somerset Council, replaced Somerset County Council and the non-metropolitan districts of Mendip, Sedgemoor, Somerset West and Taunton, and South Somerset on 1 April 2023.

Image	Title / subject	Location and coordinates	Date	Artist / designer	Type	Material	Dimensions	Designation	Owner / administrator	Wikidata	Notes
More images	Admiral Robert Blake	Bridgwater 51.1282°N 3.0039°W	1898	F. W. Pomeroy	Statue on pedestal	Bronze, limestone and granite		Grade II*	Bridgwater Town Council	Q30625603	
More images	Willow Man	51.15046°N 2.9812°W	2000	Serena de la Hey	Sculpture	Black maul willow withies over steel frame.	40 feet (12 m) high.			Q2899308	Burnt down in 2001 and rebuilt.
More images	Somerset Space Walk	Bridgwater and Taunton Canal 51.0626°N 2.9888°W	1997	Pip Youngman	Sculpture		22-kilometre (14-mile) long			Q7559907	
	West Country Carnival	Bridgwater 51.1284°N 3.0039°W	2005		Statue on pedestal	Bronze					
More images	Alfred the Great	Athelney 51.0593°N 2.9346°W	1801	Sir John Slade, 1st Baronet	Obelisk	Stone		Grade II listed building		Q26468579	Site of Athelney Abbey.
		West bank of the Parrett Estuary, a mile from the village of Combwich 51.1617°N 3.0482°W	1996		Sculpture	Wood					
More images	War memorial	St. Cuthberts Parish Church, Wells	c.1920		Lantern cross with plaques	Stone & bronze	4m tall	Grade II listed building		Q26663082	
	Adam and Eve	Bishop's Palace, Wells 51.209111°N 2.642105°W		E. J. Clack	Sculpture	Wood					
	The Weight of Our Sins	Bishop's Palace, Wells 51.209111°N 2.642105°W	2010	Josefina de Vasconcellos	Sculpture group	Bronze					
More images	Four Symbols of the Evangelists	Approach to the North Porch of Wells Cathedral	1992-93	Mary Spencer Watson	Four sculptures	Purbeck stone					
More images	Admiral Hood Monument	Compton Dundon 51.101356°N 2.721306°W	1831	Henry Goodridge	Tuscan column	Ashlar	110 feet (33.5 m) high	Grade II* listed building		Q4683688	
	Romulus and Remus	Pen Hill 51.2385°N 2.6173°W	1946	Gaetano Celestra	Neoclassical folly	Concrete and plaster over an iron armature	12 feet (4 m) high	Grade II listed building			
	Celebration	Site of West Mendip Hospital, Horrington 51.1589°N 2.7006°W	2005	James Blunt	Sculpture group						
More images	Mells War Memorial	Mells 51.240429°N 2.389446°W	1921	Sir Edwin Lutyens	War memorial	Purbeck marble		Grade II* listed building		Q17552180	
	Industria Virtute Et Labore	Yeovil									
More images	Burton Pynsent Monument	Curry Rivel 51.021667°N 2.889167°W	1767	Capability Brown		Portland Stone	140 feet (43 m) high	Grade I listed building		Q5000900	
		Dillington House									
More images	King Alfred's Tower	Brewham 51.115°N 2.365°W	1769-1772				49 metres (161 ft) high	Grade I listed building		Q7884143	
	Ball and Whirl	Fore Street, Chard 50.8728°N 2.9635°W	1991	Neville Gabie		Bronze					
	Jack The Treacle Eater	Barwick 50.9256°N 2.6231°W	c. 1920s			Stone			South Somerset District Council		
	Fish Tower	Barwick 50.9304°N 2.6273°W	c. 1920s						South Somerset District Council		
	Cone	Barwick 50.9238°N 2.6321°W	c. 1920s				75 feet (23 m) high		South Somerset District Council		
More images	Wellington Monument	Blackdown Hills 50.9480°N 3.2293°W	1854	Thomas Lee	Triangular tower	Calcareous Grit	80 feet (24 m) wide at the base and 53.34 metres (175.0 ft) high.	Grade II* listed building		Q7981443	
	Queen Victoria Memorial Fountain	Vivary Park, Taunton 51.0074°N 3.0964°W	1907							Q26565782	Made by the Saracen Foundry of Glasgow.
More images	Queen Anne	Wellington Square, Minehead	1791	Francis Bird	Statue & surround	Carrara marble		Grade II* listed building		Q17555996	Moved to current site in 1893.
More images	The Ancient Mariner	Watchet 51.182084°N 3.329038°W	2003	Alan Herriot	Statue on pedestal		7 feet (2.1 m) high		Watchet Market House Museum Society		
More images	The Hand That Holds The Map	Minehead 51.2099°N 3.4733°W	2001	Owen Cunningham	Sculpture	Steel and welded galvanised iron	3 metres (9.8 ft) high and 3 metres (9.8 ft) wide				Start of the South West Coast Path.
	John Short	Watchet 51.182084°N 3.329038°W	2008	Alan Herriot	Statue	Bronze			Watchet Market House Museum Society		
	Memorial to Sir Thomas Dyke Acland	Selworthy 51.2172°N 3.5639°W				Wood	7 metres (23 ft) high				
More images	Caratacus Stone	Exmoor 51.0905°N 3.5867°W	Possible 6th century		Monolith	Stone		Ancient monument		Q1035420	
	Fishing	Wimbleball Lake 51.0666°N 3.4666°W			Sculpture	Wicker					
