= Osijek bus station =

Main bus station in Osijek, Croatia

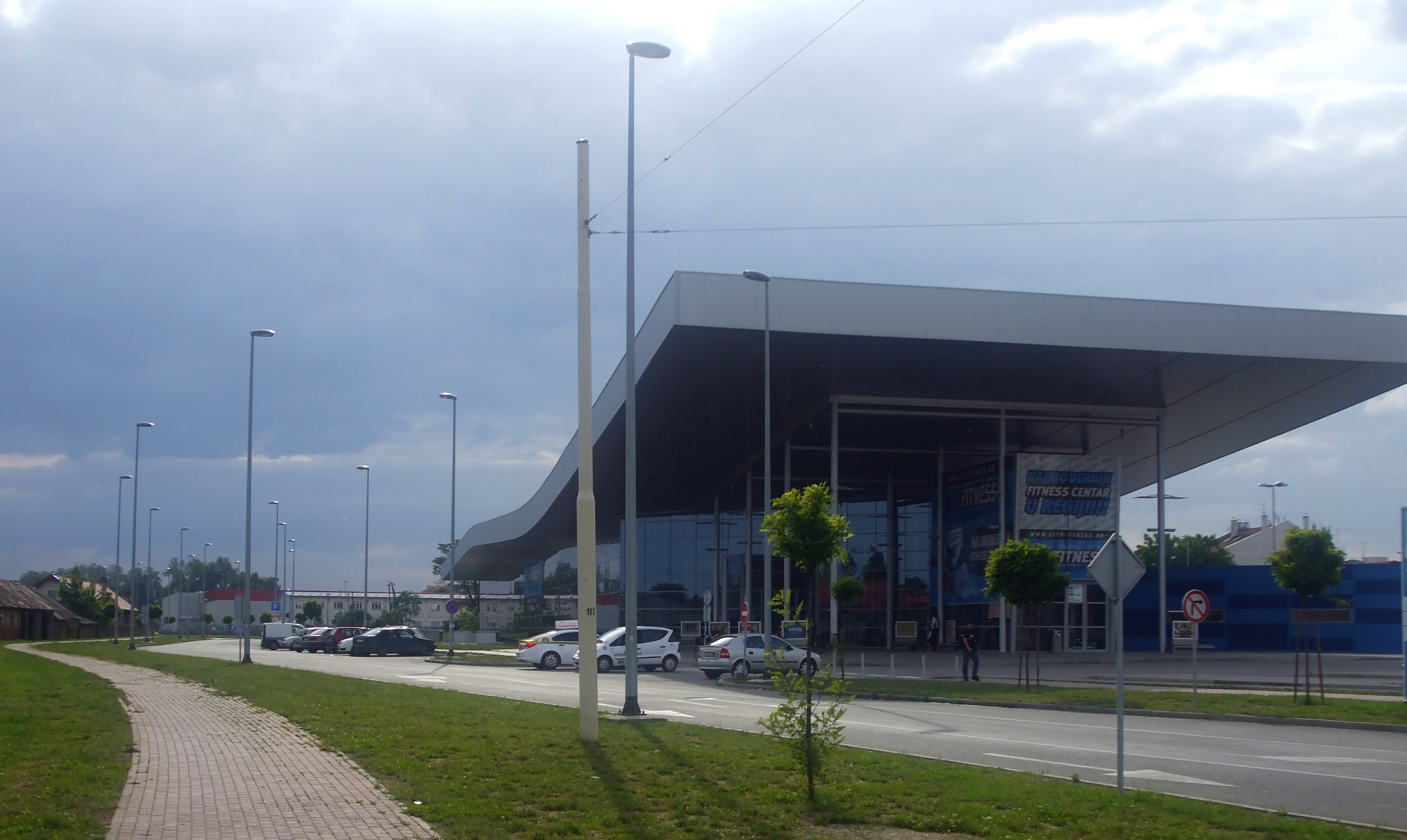

General information
- Location: Bartola Kašića 70; 31000 Osijek; Croatia
- Coordinates: 45°33′11.7″N 18°40′48.1″E
- Owner: Osijek-Koteks d.d. ^{a}
- Operator: Arriva

Construction
- Parking: 250 parking spaces (in underground garage)

History
- Opened: 3 June 2011; 15 years ago
Location

Osijek bus station (Croatian: Autobusni kolodvor Osijek) is the principal bus station in Osijek, Croatia. It was opened in 2011 and it is the most modern station in Croatia.

== Construction ==
Construction of station lasted from 2007 to 2011, when it was ceremonially opened on 3 June. City of Osijek invested 22,000 square meters of land and 5.2 million HRK for landscaping. Total construction cost was 120 million HRK. Investor and contractor was Osijek-Koteks.

In construction of building was invested 10,000 square meters of concrete, million kilograms of armature, 450 tons of load-bearing structures and 3,000 square meters of glass.

== Notes and references ==
=== Notes ===
a In accordance of Agreement of Public-Private partnership, Osijek-Koteks d.d. will be owner of station in period of 30 years after opening of station, respectively up to 2041, when City of Osijek will become owner of station.
