= Excalibur Estate =

Housing estate in Catford, London

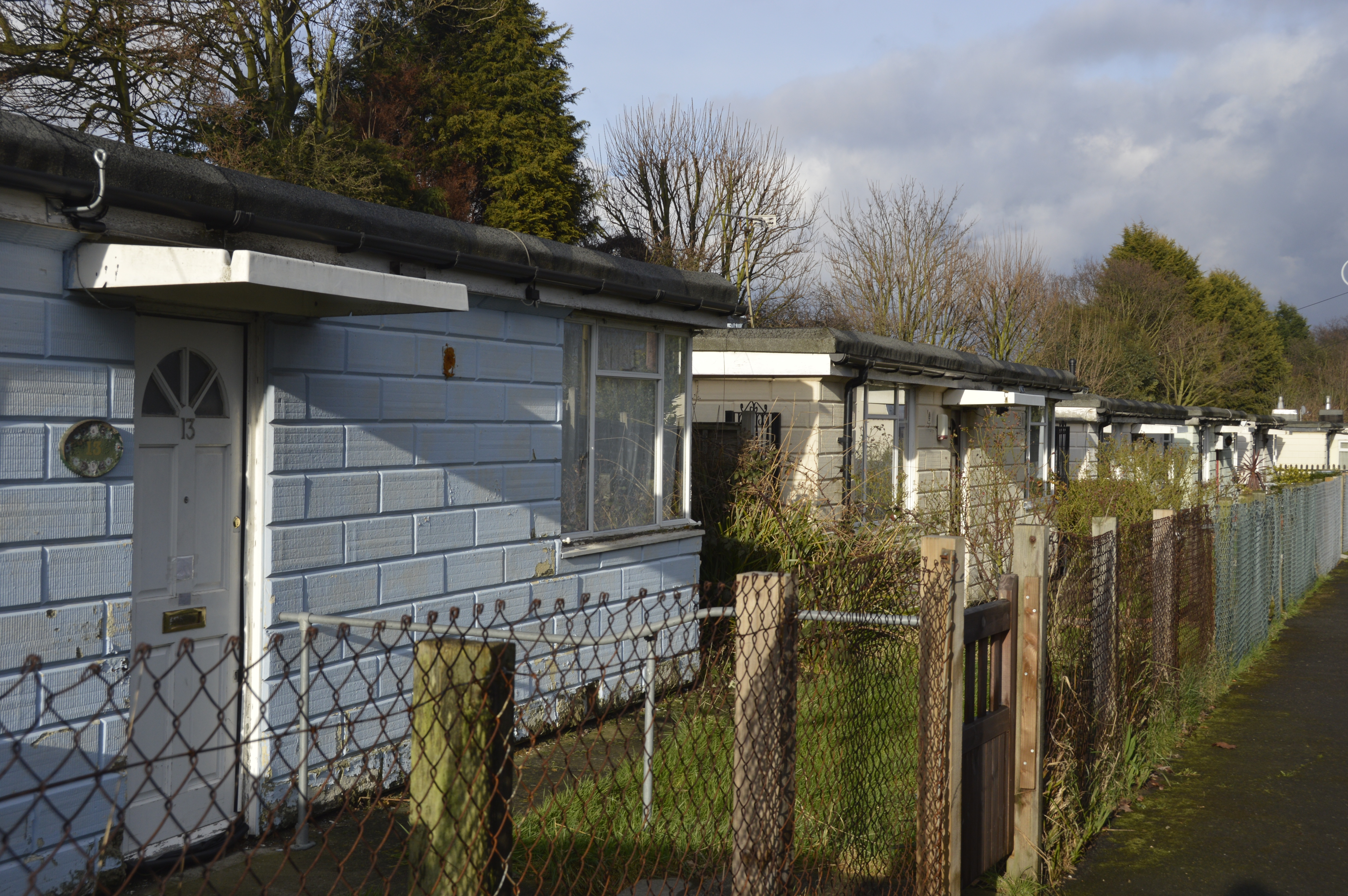
- Prefabricated houses on the estate
- Interactive map of Excalibur Estate

General information
- Location: Catford, Lewisham
- Coordinates: 51.435115°N 0.000604°W
- No. of units: 189

Construction
- Constructed: 1945-46

Listing

Listed Building – Grade II
- Designated: 16 March 2009 (six houses)
- Reference no.: 1393212

The Excalibur Estate was a post-war 1940s housing estate of 189 prefabricated houses in Catford, South London. The estate contained the last sizeable collection of post-war prefabricated houses in the United Kingdom. In 2011, Lewisham Council approved a plan to replace the prefabs with 371 houses, with demolition scheduled to begin in 2013. English Heritage has granted listed building status to six of the "prefab" houses. The proposed demolition led to campaigns by residents, English Heritage and the Twentieth Century Society to save the properties, with an unsuccessful legal challenge to prevent redevelopment, and a return to parkland, if they were demolished. Apart from the six with Grade II listing, all the buildings are due for demolition, and the redeveloped estate completed, by the late 2020s.

== Background ==
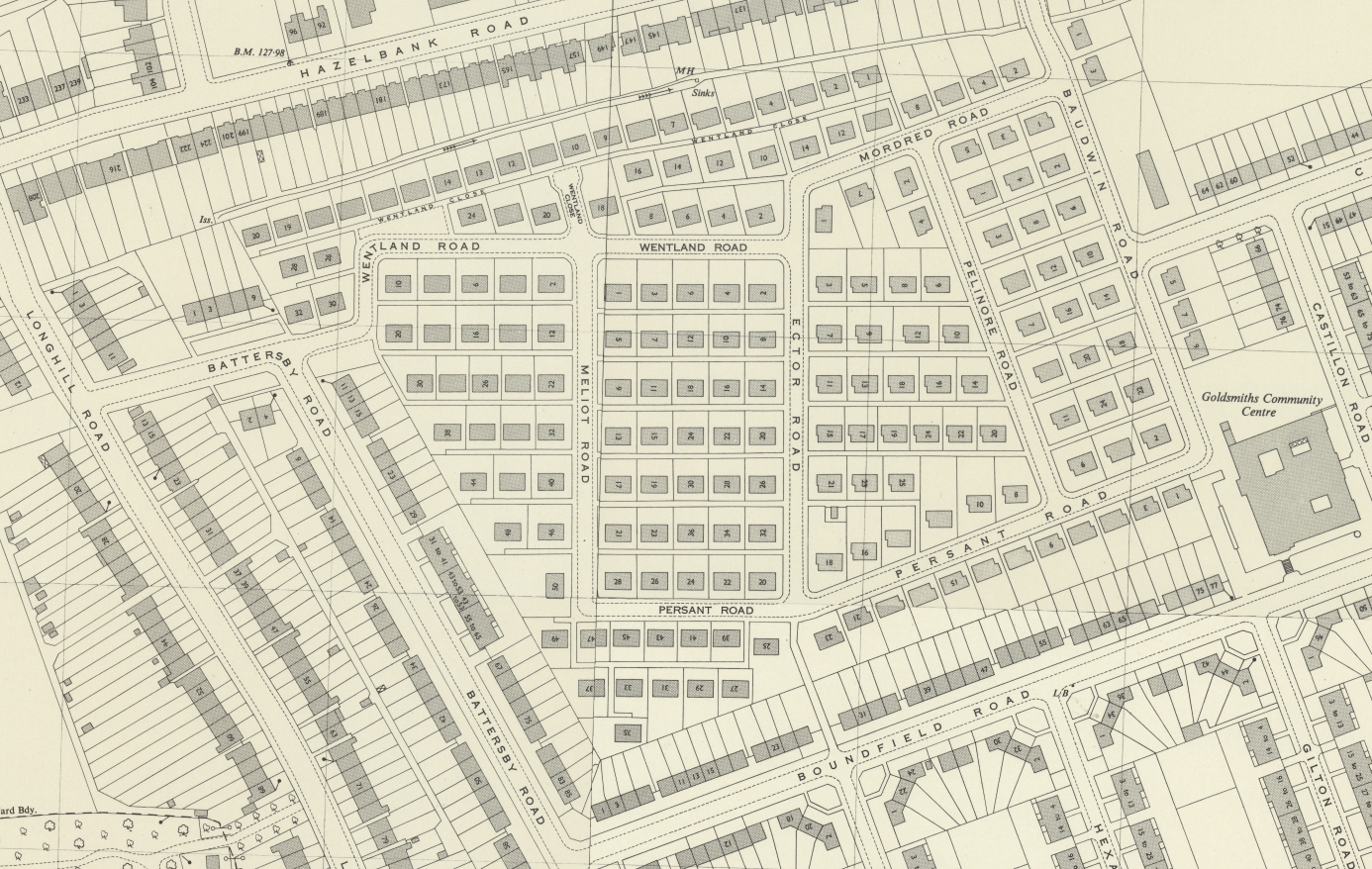
Ordnance Survey map of Excalibur Estate, 1948

After the London Blitz of the Second World War, London faced a severe housing shortage. To quickly alleviate this problem, London, like many other British cities, set about building temporary prefabricated houses.

An estimated fifteen hundred homes in Lewisham were destroyed in the first year of the war alone. The level of destruction across many British cities brought about the passing of the Housing (Temporary Accommodation) Act 1944, which led to the building of Excalibur and many estates like it.

The Excalibur Estate was constructed on parkland in Catford between 1945 and 1946 by German and Italian prisoners of war. The estate consisted of single-story prefabricated bungalows designed by the Ministry of Works; each with two bedrooms, a private garden and an indoor lavatory.

Many prefabricated estates survived for much longer than originally planned. Many corporations replaced such estates with conventional-build or permanent prefabricated council houses throughout the 1950s, 60s and early 1970s. Unusually, Excalibur survived into the 2010s.

== Etymology ==
The streets on the estate are named after characters from Arthurian legend. The precise reason for these street names is unknown.

== The estate ==
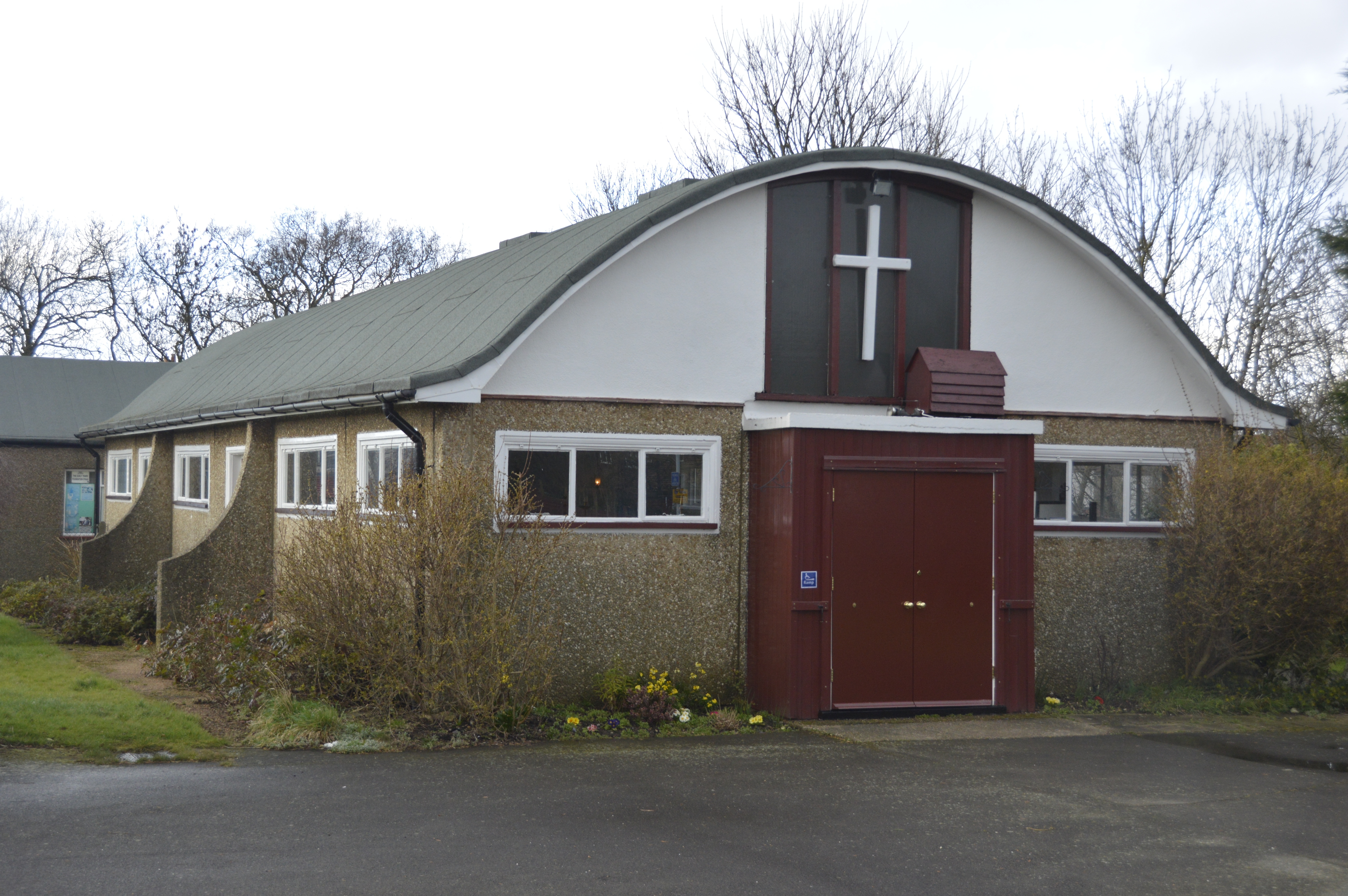
St. Mark's Church with its Anderson-style roof.

The estate consisted of 189 single storey, two-bedroomed prefabricated bungalows constructed by the Uni-seco company. The nearly flat roofs have a 7 degree pitch. There were no amenities situated on the estate except for the church, St. Marks. This building originally consisted of two huts, constructed on site in the conventional manner with a sheet-metal barrelled roof, similar to an Anderson shelter.

The nearest railway station to the estate is Bellingham.

== Demolition proposals ==
The London Borough of Lewisham proposed to demolish and replace all of the properties on the 12 acres (4.9 ha) site from 2013, using the developer L&Q. As they were the last large inhabited collection of prefabricated houses of this era, this decision proved controversial.

=== Conservation battle ===
Conservationists fought to save the estate from demolition, which they claimed was a unique surviving example of twentieth-century architecture. They succeeded in seeing Grade II listing applied by English Heritage to six buildings, including St. Mark's Church, exempting them from demolition. The conservation action was spearheaded by the Twentieth Century Society, which claimed that the overall layout and planning of the estate was key to its uniqueness, and that to conserve only six buildings, to be surrounded on all sides with new houses, did not suffice. Despite the Twentieth Century Society campaigning for the entire estate to be made a conservation area and English Heritage recommending 21 buildings be listed, the Department for Digital, Culture, Media and Sport would only go so far as to list six of the buildings. Under listing guidelines for twentieth-century buildings, only buildings with few moderations should be listed; in the case of Excalibur, most buildings had modified windows and doors. A prominent local resident favouring conservation stated: "The Excalibur Prefab Estate is the largest of its kind now left in Europe. Europe values its war time history, we on the estate think it’s time we did too." Emily Gee of English Heritage said of the estate: "The historical resonance of the estate is considerable. The design of the buildings, with their subtle modern influences, and the community-focused planning of the estate testifies to the thoughtfulness of post-Blitz reconstruction."

=== Case for demolition ===
Lewisham Council rebutted claims that the houses had historical significance and maintained that it would be "virtually impossible to bring them up to modern standards, a view shared by a number of residents, who were mainly council tenants." The council repeatedly argued that residents supported redevelopment, citing a residential poll in which 56 percent voted in favour of redevelopment. Conservationists have argued this result was inevitable as residents felt there was very little prospect of the council spending any money on their homes, leaving them in outdated accommodation. Of the estate, Lewisham Council stated "We have a responsibility under the national Decent Homes programme to bring all its housing up to a recognised standard. It simply is not financially viable to refurbish the estate." Of the listing, Lewisham mayor Steve Bullock said: "The listing by English Heritage was perverse and it has made me extremely concerned about the way that organisation behaves… These are temporary prefabricated buildings, not architectural gems."

=== Parkland covenant ===
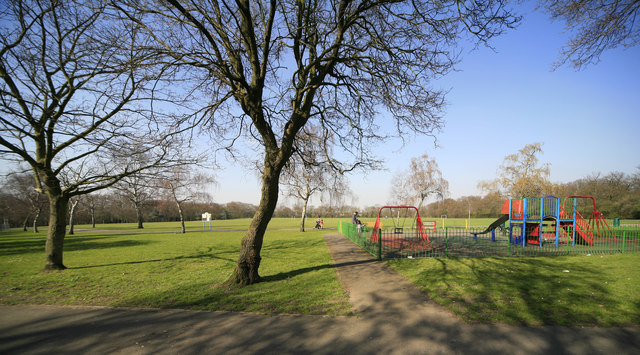
The Excalibur Estate was originally part of Forster Memorial Park, the remaining part pictured here.

Campaigners argued that the proposal to build new homes on the site could be subject to legal challenge. Prior to the building of the prefabs, the land was parkland, having been donated by the then Governor-General of Australia, Lord Forster to the then London County Council. In a 1946 letter, the London County Council promised to return it to parkland once the temporary houses had been cleared. When Lewisham council took over the estate in 1965, this letter was then made void, as Lewisham council never agreed to uphold its content.

Documentation by Uni-Seco, the prefab manufacturers and builders, countered the Greater London Authority’s claim that the prefabs had a 10 year lifespan, stating that the wartime constructions such as those on the Excalibur Estate were not temporary:

War-time building suggests “temporary” construction almost automatically, but war-time “SECO” buildings are by no means temporary in the sense that their life is restricted to a few years. All the basic materials used in the construction of the system are known, well tested in the usage, and, being themselves of a permanent character, it may be reasonably assumed, therefore, that in their combined form they will prove durable over a long period; subject, of course, to reasonable maintenance being given.

Part of the original Forster Memorial Park is still in existence to the west of Excalibur. Other housing separates Excalibur from the remaining parts of the park; if the estate was to return to parkland, Forster Memorial Park would thus be divided into two parts by Longhill Road and Battersby Road.

== Redevelopment ==
In April 2011, Lewisham Council approved a plan to replace the prefabs with 371 new homes, including some social housing. The project was originally set for completion by 2018, but after delays, the estate is now being replaced in four phases. The third phase was completed behind schedule in February 2025. This delay has had a knock-on effect on the timing of the fourth and final phase. The redevelopment of the remaining prefabs – apart from the six buildings with Grade II listing – has yet to be finalised, but is likely to completed by the late 2020s.

== See also ==
- Forster Memorial Park
- Italian Chapel, Orkney (built by Italian POWs)
- Statue of Romulus and Remus, Beechbarrow, Somerset (built by an Italian ex-POW)
