= Cuthbert James =

British soldier and Conservative politician

Cuthbert James CBE MP

Member of Parliament for Bromley
- In office 17 December 1919 – 21 July 1930
- Preceded by: Henry Forster
- Succeeded by: Edward Campbell

Personal details
- Born: 29 February 1872 London, England
- Died: 21 July 1930 (aged 58) Betteshanger, Kent, England
- Party: Conservative
- Spouse: Florence Marion Pace (m. 1905)

Lieutenant-Colonel Cuthbert James CBE MP (29 February 1872 – 21 July 1930) was a British soldier and Conservative politician.

== Biography ==
James was born in London, the second son of Walter James, 2nd Baron Northbourne, and his wife Edith Emmeline Mary (née Lane), niece of William Bagot, 3rd Baron Bagot. James was educated at Harrow School and Magdalen College, Oxford.

James joined the East Surrey Regiment in 1894 and the British Egyptian Army in 1899. He served in the Mahdist War, and followed this as administrator of Wadi Halfa, Deputy Assistant Civil Secretary to the Sudan Government, and Assistant Financial Secretary to the Egyptian Army.

After the First World War began in 1914, he rejoined the East Surrey Regiment. He served in France in 1915 and part of 1916, transferring in 1916 to the Royal Marines. He was promoted to Lieutenant-Colonel in the Army and was appointed a Commander of the Order of the British Empire in the 1919 Birthday Honours.

He represented Bromley in the House of Commons from 1919 until his death.

James married Florence Marion Packe, daughter of Hussey Packe, in 1905. He died in July 1930, aged 58, in Betteshanger, Kent. His wife survived him by two-and-a-half years and died in January 1933.

Parliament of the United Kingdom
| Preceded by Henry Forster | Member of Parliament for Bromley; 1919–1930 | Succeeded by Edward Campbell |
