= Sir Edward Campbell, 1st Baronet =

British politician (1879–1945)

Sir Edward Campbell KStJ JP MP
- Campbell in 1928

Member of Parliament for Bromley
- In office 2 September 1930 – 17 July 1945
- Preceded by: Cuthbert James
- Succeeded by: Harold Macmillan

Personal details
- Born: Edward Taswell Campbell; 9 April 1879
- Died: 17 July 1945 (aged 66) Bromley, Kent, England
- Party: Conservative
- Spouse: Edith Jane Warren (m. 1904)
- Children: 3
- Parent: Frederick Campbell (father)
- Relatives: Sir John Campbell (paternal grandfather)

Sir Edward Taswell Campbell, 1st Baronet, KStJ JP (9 April 1879 – 17 July 1945) was a Conservative Party politician in the United Kingdom.

== Ancestry ==
He was the son of Lieutenant Colonel Frederick Campbell (15 June 1843 – Airds, Sydenham Hill, Surrey, 13 September 1926) and wife (m. Christ Church, Paddington, 28 January 1869) Emilie Guillamine Maclaine (c. 1847 – Airds, Sydenham Hill, Surrey, 21 July 1928) and the paternal grandson of Sir John Campbell, of Airds.

== Career ==
Educated at Dulwich College, Dulwich, London, prior to entering politics he served as a Vice Consul in Java between 1914 and 1920.

He was elected as Member of Parliament (MP) for Camberwell North West in 1924 but was defeated in 1929. He returned to the House of Commons in a by-election in 1930 as member for Bromley and sat until his death, which occurred during the 1945 general election. Polling took place on 5 July 1945. Campbell died 12 days later, but nine days before the declaration of the result. He was declared posthumously elected on 26 July 1945, provoking a by-election in his Bromley constituency. That contest was won by Harold Macmillan. (Coincidentally, Leslie Pym, the member for Monmouth, died exactly the same day and was also posthumously elected.)

In the House of Commons Campbell served as Parliamentary Private Secretary to Sir Kingsley Wood on various occasions between 1931 and 1943, and later was PPS to Henry Willink as Minister of Health.

== Later years and death ==
Sir Edward Campbell was created a Knight Bachelor in 1933 and the 1st Baronet Campbell, of Airds in the County of Argyll, and of Bromley in the County of Kent, in the Baronetage of the United Kingdom, on 3 July 1939. He also served as Justice of the Peace of Kent. He died in Bromley, Kent, aged 66.

== Marriage and children ==
He married on 28 January 1904 Edith Jane Warren (Surabaya, Java, Dutch East Indies, 7 December 1880 - Stonycrest, Hindhead, Surrey, 26 October 1951), daughter of Arthur John Warren (baptized St Pancras Old Church, London, 22 July 1847 - Epsom, Surrey, 17 November 1930), British Vice Consul in Surabaya and his wife Sophia Jane Wilson (St Pancras, London, 17 May 1856 - Epsom, Surrey, 26 January 1920), and had issue, including:

- Frances Henriette Campbell (born Semarang, Java, Dutch East Indies, 30 November 1904), married on 16 December 1930 Rear Admiral Keith McNeil Walter (later Campbell-Walter) (Hazaribagh, British India, 3 August 1904 – 24 April 1976), son of Alexander McNeill Walter, of Hazaribagh, India, Zamindari Manager (Calcutta, British India, 12 May 1875 - Hazaribagh, British India, 12 February 1936), and wife Florence Ruth Gisella Downing (Purneah, Bengal, British India, 5 October 1879 – Egham, Surrey, 8 April 1976), whose daughter was:
  - Fiona Frances Elaine Campbell-Walter (born Takapuna, Auckland Region, New Zealand, 25 June 1932), New Zealand-born British fashion model, married as his third wife at Lugano-Castagnola, 17 September 1956, Baron Hans Heinrich Thyssen-Bornemisza (2 April 1921 – 26 April 2002), an industrialist and art collector
- Sir Charles Duncan Macnair Campbell, 2nd Baronet, of Airds (12 September 1906 – 16 January 1954; died unmarried and without issue, and the title became extinct with his death)

== Bibliography ==
- Craig, F. W. S. (1983) [1969]. British parliamentary election results 1918-1949 (3rd ed.). Chichester: Parliamentary Research Services. ISBN 0-900178-06-X.
- 'Who's Who of British MPs: Volume IV, 1945-1979' by Michael Stenton and Stephen Lees (Harvester, Brighton, 1979) ISBN 0-85527-335-6

Parliament of the United Kingdom
Preceded by Thomas Macnamara	Member of Parliament for Camberwell North West; 1924–1929	Succeeded by Hyacinth Morgan
Preceded by Cuthbert James	Member of Parliament for Bromley; 1930–1945	Succeeded by Harold Macmillan
Baronetage of the United Kingdom
New creation	Baronet (of Airds); 1939–1945	Succeeded by Charles Campbell
