= John Hunt (British politician, born 1929) =

British politician (1929–2017)

Sir John Hunt

Member of Parliament for Ravensbourne Bromley (1964–1974)
- In office 15 October 1964 – 8 April 1997
- Preceded by: Harold Macmillan
- Succeeded by: Constituency abolished

Personal details
- Born: John Leonard Hunt; 27 October 1929
- Died: 19 September 2017 (aged 87)
- Party: Conservative
- Education: Dulwich College
- Occupation: Stockbroker

Sir John Leonard Hunt (27 October 1929 – 19 September 2017) was a British Conservative Party politician.

== Early life ==
Hunt was educated at Dulwich College and became a stockbroker.

== Political career ==
He served as a councillor on Bromley Borough Council 1953–61, then became an alderman in 1961, joining the new London Borough of Bromley in 1964. He was Mayor of Bromley from 1963 to 1965.

He first stood for Parliament, unsuccessfully, at the 1959 general election, contesting Lewisham South, and he was also unsuccessful in the equivalent seat at the 1961 London County Council election.

Hunt was a Member of Parliament (MP) for 33 years, serving in Bromley from 1964 to 1974, originally succeeding former Prime Minister Harold Macmillan, and in Ravensbourne from 1974 until he retired in 1997.

Hunt was knighted in 1989.

He never married, and died on 19 September 2017 at the age of 87.

Parliament of the United Kingdom
Preceded by Harold Macmillan	Member of Parliament for Bromley; 1964–Feb 1974	Constituency abolished
New constituency	Member of Parliament for Ravensbourne; Feb 1974–1997	Constituency abolished
