= 1930 Bromley by-election =

UK parliamentary by-election

The 1930 Bromley by-election was a parliamentary by-election held on 2 September 1930 for the British House of Commons constituency of Bromley in north-west Kent.

== Vacancy ==
The seat had become vacant when the constituency's Conservative Member of Parliament (MP), the Honourable Cuthbert James, died on 21 July 1930, aged 58. He had held the seat since winning a by-election in December 1919.

== Electoral history ==
General election 1929: Bromley
| Party | Candidate | Votes | % | ±% |
|---|---|---|---|---|
| Conservative | Cuthbert James | 25,449 | 47.2 | −6.5 |
| Liberal | Wilfred Gurney Fordham | 18,372 | 34.1 | +3.4 |
| Labour | Albert Edwin Ashworth | 10,105 | 18.7 | +3.1 |
| Majority | | 6,077 | 13.1 | −9.9 |
| Turnout | | 53,926 | 73.1 | −5.5 |
| Conservative hold | | Swing | -5.0 | |

== Candidates ==
The Conservative candidate was Edward Campbell, a 51-year-old former diplomat. Campbell had been Member of Parliament for Camberwell North West from 1924 until his defeat in 1929.

The Liberal Party ran 27 year-old Wilfred Gurney Fordham of Mill Vale, Bromley. Fordham was a barrister, called by the Inner Temple in 1929. He was educated at St George's School, Harpenden, and Magdalene College, Cambridge. He had been the Liberal candidate here at the 1929 general election.

The Labour candidate was Albert Edwin Ashworth, who had also stood in 1929 and had come last of three.

The fourth candidate, V.C. Redwood, stood for the United Empire Party, which sought to make the British Empire a free trade bloc. This party was the creature of Lord Beaverbrook and Lord Rothermere, respectively proprietors of the Daily Express and Daily Mail.

The Empire Crusade and their newspapers had been pressing the leader of the Conservative Party, Stanley Baldwin, to adopt a more protectionist position. Their newspapers and platform were much more popular with the middle-class, commuter towns, in the Home Counties and London suburbs than elsewhere, and in safe Conservative seats; Bromley fitted these criteria perfectly.

== Result ==
On a much-reduced turnout, Campbell held the seat for the Conservatives with a majority of 1,606 votes. Redwood came third with 24.1% of the votes, a setback for the Empire Crusade which also failed to win the Westminster St George's by-election the following March. Ironically for a campaign that sought to turn the Conservative Party to the right, the split vote almost allowed a Liberal victory. Fordham came second with 11,176 votes.

By-election 1930: Bromley
| Party | Candidate | Votes | % | ±% |
|---|---|---|---|---|
| Conservative | Edward Campbell | 12,782 | 32.4 | −14.8 |
| Liberal | Wilfred Gurney Fordham | 11,176 | 28.4 | −5.7 |
| United Empire Party | V C Redwood | 9,483 | 24.1 | New |
| Labour | Albert Edwin Ashworth | 5,942 | 15.1 | −3.6 |
| Majority | | 1,606 | 4.0 | −9.1 |
| Turnout | | 39,383 | 53.4 | −19.7 |
| Conservative hold | | Swing | -4.5 | |

== Aftermath ==
Following the formation of the National Government, the Liberals chose not to run a candidate at the 1931 general election, Campbell would hold the seat with a majority over Labour of over 37,000 (67%). The United Empire Party by this time had become defunct. Campbell would serve until his death in office in 1945. Fordham did not contest another parliamentary election for 29 years when he ran as the Labour Party candidate at Wycombe

== See also ==
- Bromley (UK Parliament constituency)
- Bromley
- Lists of United Kingdom by-elections
