= Ravensbourne (constituency) =

UK Parliament constituency (1974–1997)

- Former borough constituency for the House of Commons
- Boundary of Ravensbourne in Greater London for the 1983 general election
- County: Greater London

February 1974–1997
- Seats: One
- Created from: Bromley
- Replaced by: Bromley & Chislehurst, Beckenham and Orpington

Ravensbourne was a borough constituency in the London Borough of Bromley in south London. It returned one Member of Parliament (MP) to the House of Commons of the Parliament of the United Kingdom by the first-past-the-post system. It existed from the February 1974 general election until it was abolished for the 1997 general election.

== History ==
This was a safe Conservative seat held by Sir John Hunt for the entire period of its existence.

The constituency shared boundaries with the Ravensbourne electoral division for election of councillors to the Greater London Council at elections in 1973, 1977 and 1981.

== Boundaries ==
Dates	Local authority	Maps	Wards
1974–1983	London Borough of Bromley		Bromley Common, Keston and Hayes, Martin's Hill and Town, West Wickham North, and West Wickham South.
1983–1997	London Borough of Bromley		Biggin Hill, Bromley Common and Keston, Darwin, Hayes, Martins Hill and Town, West Wickham North, and West Wickham South.

== Members of Parliament ==
Election	Member	Party
Feb 1974	Sir John Hunt	Conservative
1997	constituency abolished: see Bromley & Chislehurst, Beckenham and Orpington	

== Elections ==
=== Elections in the 1970s ===
1970 notional result
Party	Vote	%
Conservative	20,500	59.6
Liberal	7,100	20.6
Labour	6,800	19.8
Turnout	34,400	69.1
Electorate	49,795	

General election February 1974: Ravensbourne
Party	Candidate	Votes	%	±%
Conservative	John Hunt	20,420	51.5	−8.1
Liberal	David Crowe	11,523	29.0	+8.4
Labour	Michael Hession	6,943	17.5	−2.3
National Front	Geoffrey Parker	786	2.0	New
Majority		8,897	22.4	−16.5
Turnout		39,673	82.5	+13.4
Registered electors		48,089		
Conservative hold		Swing	−8.3	

General election October 1974: Ravensbourne
Party	Candidate	Votes	%	±%
Conservative	John Hunt	18,318	51.0	−0.5
Liberal	David Crowe	9,813	27.3	−1.7
Labour	Christopher Howes	7,204	20.1	+2.5
National Front	I Stevens	574	1.6	−0.4
Majority		8,505	23.7	+1.3
Turnout		35,910	74.0	−8.5
Registered electors		48,541		
Conservative hold		Swing	+0.6	

General election 1979: Ravensbourne
Party	Candidate	Votes	%	±%
Conservative	John Hunt	22,501	60.9	+9.9
Liberal	William Shipley	7,111	19.3	−8.1
Labour	John R Holbrook	6,848	18.5	−1.5
National Front	Stephen Greene	478	1.3	−0.3
Majority		15,390	41.7	+18.0
Turnout		36,938	77.6	+3.6
Registered electors		47,601		
Conservative hold		Swing	+9.0	

1979 notional result
Party	Vote	%
Conservative	27,761	61.0
Liberal	9,455	20.8
Labour	7,696	16.9
Others	579	1.3
Turnout	45,491	
Electorate		

=== Elections in the 1980s ===
General election 1983: Ravensbourne
Party	Candidate	Votes	%	±%
Conservative	John Hunt	27,143	63.0	+2.0
Liberal	Catharine Boston	11,631	27.0	+6.2
Labour	John R Holbrook	4,037	9.4	−7.5
BNP	AT Shotton	242	0.6	−0.7
Majority		15,512	36.0	−4.2
Turnout		43,055	73.2	
Registered electors		58,811		
Conservative hold		Swing	−2.1	

General election 1987: Ravensbourne
Party	Candidate	Votes	%	±%
Conservative	John Hunt	28,295	63.0	−0.1
Liberal	Gareth Campbell	11,376	25.3	−1.7
Labour	Michael D'Arcy	5,087	11.3	+1.9
BNP	Alfred Waite	184	0.4	−0.2
Majority		16,919	37.7	+1.6
Turnout		44,939	75.7	+2.5
Registered electors		59,365		
Conservative hold		Swing	+0.8	

=== Elections in the 1990s ===
General election 1992: Ravensbourne
Party	Candidate	Votes	%	±%
Conservative	John Hunt	29,506	63.4	+0.5
Liberal Democrats	Paul JH Booth	9,792	21.1	−4.3
Labour	Ernest W Dyer	6,182	13.3	+2.0
Green	IJ Mouland	617	1.3	New
Liberal	P White	318	0.7	New
Natural Law	JW Shepheard	105	0.2	New
Majority		19,714	42.4	+4.8
Turnout		46,520	81.2	+5.5
Registered electors		57,259		
Conservative hold		Swing	+2.4	

== See also ==
- Parliamentary constituencies in London
