= 1902 Sevenoaks by-election =

UK parliamentary by-election

The 1902 Sevenoaks by-election was held on 21 August 1902 after the appointment of the incumbent Conservative MP Henry Forster as Lord Commissioner of the Treasury. The seat was retained by Forster.

== Vacancy ==
Under the provisions of the Succession to the Crown Act 1707 and a number of subsequent Acts, MPs appointed to certain ministerial and legal offices were at this time required to seek re-election. The by-election in Sevenoaks was caused by the appointment on 8 August 1902 of the sitting Conservative MP, Henry Forster as Lords Commissioners of the Treasury.

== Candidates ==
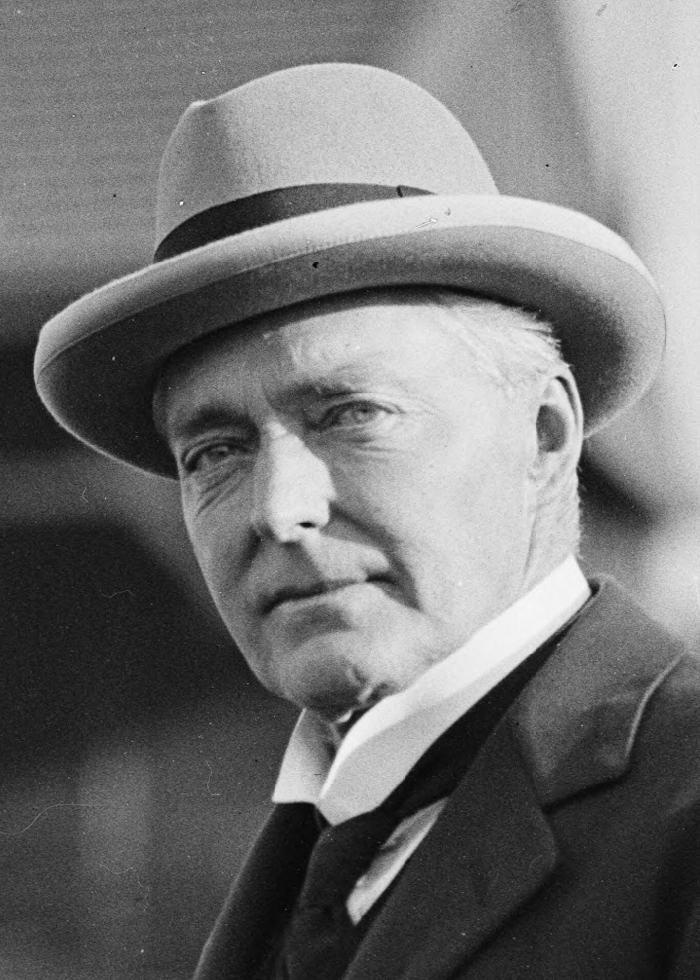
Forster

The incumbent, Henry Forster was the candidate for the Conservative party.

Beaumont Morice was adopted as the Liberal Party candidate at a meeting of the Sevenoaks liberal council on 13 August 1902. Morice was Recorder of Hythe, and lived in Kent. He had unsuccessfully contested the Wells division of Somerset in 1892 and 1895.

== Issues ==
=== Education ===
Following the successful campaign in the Leeds North by-election in July 1902, Morice spent much of the election on the government's plans for an Education Bill to replace school boards with local education authorities, which included proposals to bring church schools into the public system. Many Liberals were strongly nonconformist and the idea that Church of England and Roman Catholic schools should be funded from the rates, a form of local taxation, was anathema to them. It provided the battle slogan 'Rome on the Rates' and united the party against the government. In an address to the electorate, Morice argued that the government "had no mandate whatever to the destroy the School Board system of the country, which has worked with such splendid results for so many years." Forster and the Conservative party had not intended to spend much time on the education issue, but was forced to actively defend the proposal in various speeches. He argued to ″entrust all matters relating to secular education to the local education authorities″, stating it would be a "great improvement upon our present system". Two days before the election, the issue had rattled the governing Conservatives enough to provoke an open letter from the Prime Minister Arthur Balfour to Forster and his constituents, leading to a similar response from Sir Henry Campbell-Bannerman, the Liberal party leader.

=== Other issues ===
Morice also raised the issue of the corn tax, stating that it was a "heavy and unnecessary burden on the working classes". Forster barely mentioned this issue, dismissing it as a small registration duty not worth discussing.

Forster used the recent peace following the Second Boer War in South Africa to mobilize government supporters, and argued that the work of reform and improvement should be entrusted to those who had been responsible for the Army and Navy during the last years.

The Sevenoaks Licensed Victuallers' Association submitted questions to both candidates, and on 15 August unanimously resolved to support Forster. In response, the Liberals claimed to have the united support of the teetotal section of the electorate.

== Result ==
Forster retained the seat by a 9% majority, but the Liberal party had an impressive increase of 24% from the previous election.

Sevenoaks by-election, 1902
Party	Candidate	Votes	%	±%
Conservative	Henry Forster	5,333	54.6	−24.1
Liberal	Beaumont Morice	4,442	45.4	+24.1
Majority		891	9.2	−48.2
Turnout		9,775	63.4	+6.9
Conservative hold		Swing	-24.1	
