= Henry Forster, 1st Baron Forster =

British politician and cricketer

The Right Honourable The Lord Forster GCMG
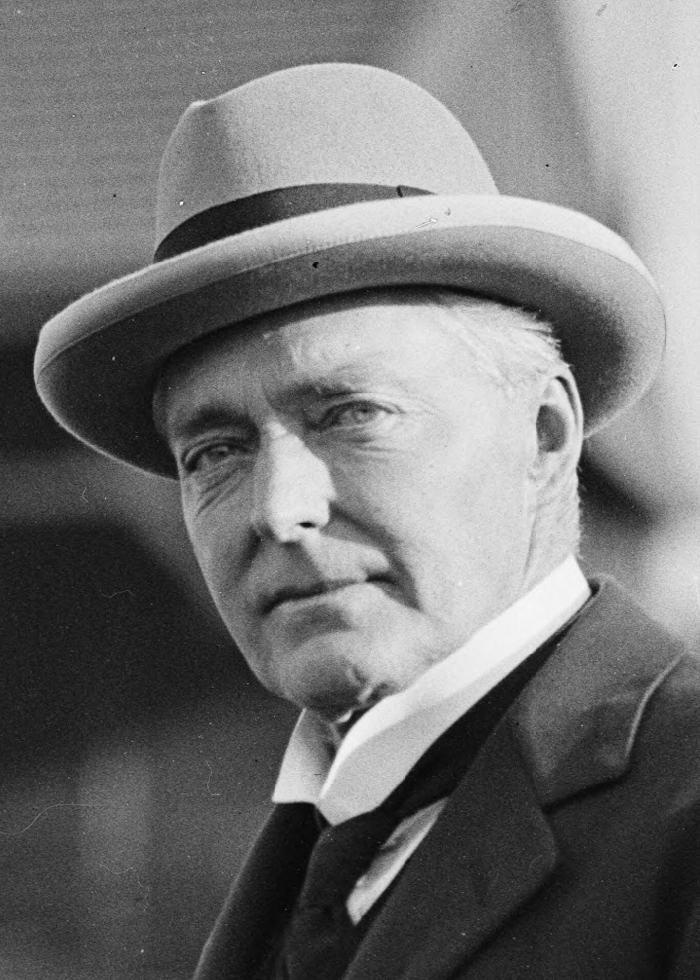
- H.E. the Lord Forster in 1925

7th Governor-General of Australia
- In office 6 October 1920 – 8 October 1925
- Monarch: George V
- Prime Minister: Billy Hughes; Stanley Bruce
- Preceded by: Sir Ronald Munro Ferguson
- Succeeded by: The Viscount Stonehaven

Member of Parliament
- In office 26 July 1892 – 12 December 1919
- Preceded by: Charles Mills
- Succeeded by: Cuthbert James
- Constituency: Sevenoaks (1892–1918); Bromley (1918–1919)

Personal details
- Born: 31 January 1866 Catford, Kent, England
- Died: 15 January 1936 (aged 69) London, England
- Resting place: Exbury, Hampshire; 50.8004°N 1.3957°W
- Party: Conservative
- Spouse: Hon. Rachel Douglas-Scott-Montagu (m. 1890)
- Relations: Lord Avebury; Lord Montagu of Beaulieu
- Children: 2 sons, 2 daughters
- Nickname: Harry
- Cricket career

Personal information
- Height: 6 ft 0 in (1.83 m)
- Batting: Right-handed
- Bowling: Slow left-arm orthodox

Domestic team information
- Years: Team
- 1885–1895: Hampshire
- 1886–1889: Oxford University

Career statistics
Competition	First-class
Matches	43
Runs scored	807
Batting average	11.69
100s/50s	0/2
Top score	60*
Balls bowled	7,134
Wickets	135
Bowling average	21.65
5 wickets in innings	7
10 wickets in match	2
Best bowling	8/119
Catches/stumpings	43/–
- Source: Henry Forster at Cricinfo

GCMG breast star

Henry William Forster, 1st Baron Forster (31 January 1866 – 15 January 1936), was a British politician and first-class cricketer who served as the seventh Governor-General of Australia from 1920 to 1925. He was previously a government minister under Arthur Balfour, Herbert Asquith, and David Lloyd George.

Born at the family seat in Catford, Kent, Forster attended Eton College before going up to Oxford, matriculating at New College. In his youth he played first-class cricket, predominantly for Oxford University and Hampshire, making 43 appearances at first-class level. An all-rounder, it was as a bowler that he achieved most success, taking 135 wickets with his slow left-arm orthodox bowling. He was later nominated President of Marylebone Cricket Club for 1919.

Forster was elected to the House of Commons in 1892, representing Sevenoaks for the Conservative Party. He was appointed a Lord Commissioner of the Treasury under Balfour from 1902 to 1905, later becoming the Finance Member of the Army Council during the First World War from 1915 to 1919. Elevated to the peerage in 1919, Forster was appointed Governor-General of Australia the following year. His appointment was a change from that of his predecessors, his name having been put forward to the Australian Government by Colonial Secretary, Viscount Milner, as one of three candidates to succeed the outgoing Governor-General Sir Ronald Munro Ferguson. This approach broke with tradition, being when the Commonwealth Government was first consulted over Crown appointments.

Returning to Britain after five years in Australia, Forster held various ceremonial posts in Hampshire, including Verderer of the New Forest, as well as directorships of three Australian financial institutions. In 1936, Forster died in London after failing to recover from surgery for coronary-vascular disease.

== Early life and education ==
Henry William Forster was born at Southend Hall, Catford, the elder surviving son of Major John Forster (1826–1886), late 6th Dragoon Guards, by his wealthy wife, Emily Jane née Ashton Case. He was educated at Eton College, playing cricket for the school without notable success, and where he was Keeper of Rackets in 1884 and 1885. After Eton, he went up to Oxford to read Jurisprudence, graduating with a third-class degree in 1889. Awarded a blue in cricket, at Oxford he also excelled at tennis and fencing. Retaining connections with his alma mater, later in life the Fellows of New College elected Lord Forster an Honorary Fellow.

== Cricket career ==
His father, Major John Forster, became seated from 1880 at Exbury House, Hampshire, which made him eligible to play county cricket for Hampshire under residency rules at the time. An all-rounder, he would make his debut in first-class cricket for Hampshire shortly after he finished his schooling at Eton in the summer of 1885, making two appearances against Somerset at Southampton and Kent at Tonbridge. During his first year at Oxford in 1886, he played one first-class match for Oxford University Cricket Club against the Marylebone Cricket Club (MCC) at Oxford; he made a further first-class appearance during that season for I Zingari against the Gentlemen of England.

Forster featured prominently in the Oxford team during the 1887 season as a slow left-arm orthodox bowler, making seven appearances. In that year's University Match against Cambridge University at Lord's, he scored an unbeaten 60 runs in Oxford's first innings, with Oxford winning the match by seven wickets. Selected to play for the Gentlemen in the 1887 Gentlemen v Players fixtures, he also made appearances once each for I Zingari and the MCC. Across the 1887 season, he took a total of 34 wickets at an average of 27.02, claiming five wickets in an innings on two occasions. The following season, he made seven first-class appearances for Oxford University and then at the Scarborough Festival in August, he again played for I Zingari and the MCC. Across that season, he took 43 wickets at an average of 17.88. He claimed his career-best bowling figures in 1888, taking 8 for 119 for Oxford University against the Gentlemen of England at The Parks. The 1889 season was to be his last as an undergraduate at Oxford, with Forster making seven appearances, including a third appearance in the University Match. In 22 matches for Oxford, he took 81 wickets at an average of 21.59, with five wickets in an innings on five occasions and ten wickets in a match twice. He also played once for I Zingari in 1889, at the season end's Scarborough Festival. Over that season, he took 25 wickets at an average of 19.08.

Forster played several first-class matches for various ad hoc teams in 1890, including for an Oxford and Cambridge Universities Past & Present XI against the touring Australians at Portsmouth. He played just one first-class match in each 1891, 1892 and 1893. His 1891 and 1892 appearances both came for the Gentlemen of England against Oxford University, while in 1893 he made a second appearance for Oxford and Cambridge Universities Past & Present XI against the touring Australians. Hampshire had lost first-class status after the 1885 season, but Forster continued playing minor county cricket becoming captain of Hampshire in 1889. With Hampshire returning to first-class status in 1894 and admitted to the County Championship for the 1895 season, Forster would make two appearances in the 1895 County Championship against Derbyshire and Yorkshire. Later in the 1895 season, he played his last first-class match for Hampshire against the MCC.

Throughout his first-class career, Forster took a total of 135 wickets at an average of 21.65. His batting, described by Wisden, was as a "strong right-handed batsman" scoring mainly through off-drives and cut shots; Wisden further opined Forster being a strong batsman on hard pitches, who struggled on pitches affected by rain. He scored the majority of his first-class runs (358) for Oxford University, recording two half-centuries. Overall in first-class cricket he scored 807 runs at a batting average of 11.69. The Times noted that Forster was a "sound" mid-off fielder, taking 43 catches during his cricketing career.

After Lord Hawke's extended term as President of Marylebone Cricket Club during the Great War, in 1919 Forster was nominated its first post-war president with his former Hampshire captain, Sir Francis Lacey, serving as Secretary to the MCC. Lord Forster was succeeded by the 4th Earl of Ellesmere as MCC President for 1920.

== Political career ==
Forster entered the House of Commons as the Conservative Member of Parliament (MP) for Sevenoaks at the 1892 general election, defeating the Liberal Party candidate by 2,128 votes. He was returned unopposed at the 1895 general election, then defeated the Liberal candidate Murray Spencer Richardson by 4,812 votes at the 1900 general election. From 1901, appointed by the Earl Stanhope, he served as a Deputy Lieutenant for Kent. In 1902, he was appointed a Lord Commissioner of the Treasury by Prime Minister Arthur Balfour, triggering a by-election pursuant to the Succession to the Crown Act 1707 and subsequent legislation, which at that time required MPs holding certain ministerial and legal offices to seek re-election to Parliament. His re-election campaign against Liberal candidate, Judge Beaumont Morice, majored on recent success in the Second Boer War and for the ongoing project of reform and improvement to be entrusted with those responsible overseeing the British Army and Royal Navy during the military conflict. Returned for Sevenoaks, albeit with a reduced majority of 891 votes, later in 1902 Forster was appointed a Whip.

Forster remained a Lord Commissioner until the Conservative's defeat at the 1906 general election, with the Liberals, led by Henry Campbell-Bannerman, forming the Government; although his party was defeated, Forster retained his seat but with a majority of just 364 votes. In Opposition, he was tasked with opposing David Lloyd George's National Insurance Act, his criticism of which drew admiration from Lloyd George. A constitutional crisis caused by the Conservative-dominated House of Lords rejecting the People's Budget, triggered the 1910 general election when, successfully defending his seat against the Liberal Sir Frederic Lely with an increased majority of 4,070, the election resulted in a hung parliament. In December, another general election was called to establish a mandate for the Liberal Party to pass the Parliament Act, when Forster was returned unopposed. A general election planned for July 1914, when all MPs would have to defend their seats, was aborted due to the outbreak of the First World War.

Forster served in the wartime Asquith-led coalition as Financial Secretary to the War Office from May 1915, and subsequently in the Lloyd George-led coalition. Following the cessation of hostilities in November 1918, a general election was called the following month. Forster chose not to defend his Sevenoaks marginal seat, instead being selected to contest the newly-created Bromley constituency, where he defeated the Liberal candidate Holford Knight by 12,501 votes. In December 1919, upon his elevation to the peerage as Baron Forster, of Lepe in the County of Southampton, he stood down as an MP and resigned as a Minister in the War Office.

== Governor-General of Australia ==
In June 1920, Forster was put forward to the Australian Government by the Colonial Secretary, Viscount Milner, as one of three candidates to succeed the outgoing Governor-General of Australia, Sir Ronald Munro Ferguson. Breaking with tradition, this was the first ever approach to the Australian Government for consultation. Being the preferred candidate of Australian Prime Minister Billy Hughes, who seemingly thought his reputation as an unassuming character was one he could control, Forster's sporting prowess was considered an additional advantage. Approved on the understanding that his term of office was to be for only two years with the provision of a small personal allowance, Forster was then appointed a Knight Grand Cross of the Order of St Michael and St George on 28 June 1920. Lord Forster went on to serve a five-year term, drawing on his family fortune to support his official duties.

Forster arrived at Melbourne at the beginning of October 1920 being sworn in as Governor-General on 7 October. He found that the congenial atmosphere of pre-war Australian politics had been shattered by bitter battles during the wartime period. Hughes's Nationalist Party dominated the post-war political scene, with the Labor Party in Opposition having moved leftwards becoming anti-imperialist and pacifist, and more markedly socialist. During his five years in office, he stood back from direct involvement in Australian politics and oversaw only one change of government, when Hughes was replaced as prime minister by Stanley Bruce in February 1923. Forster took care not to engage in political manoeuvrings leading to that change. As Australia grew more independent and confident conducting international relations, the Governor-General became less involved as a governmental intermediary and overseer during the post-war years.

Adapting with the times, Forster helped steer the role into that of modern-day Governors-General: making official visits, opening hospitals (the new "Rachel Forster Hospital" at Redfern, New South Wales, was renamed in Lady Forster's honour in 1925) and fêtes, attending sporting events as well as hosting formal balls and banquets. As a consequence of exercising less ostensible influence than his predecessors, Forster enjoyed much greater popularity than most previous Governors-General. Forster and his wife, Rachel, devoted themselves to charities, and he spent much time travelling throughout the Australian states and country areas, unveiling war memorials and delivering patriotic speeches. In 1924, notably he was the first Governor-General to visit the former German protectorate of New Guinea. His passion for cricket ever evident, in Australia Forster became a frequent guest at Test and Sheffield Shield matches. By invitation of Governor Sir Tom Bridges behalf SACA, Lord Forster unveiled the portrait of George Giffen in the Western Stand at Adelaide Oval, before his term as Governor-General ended on 7 October 1925.

== Later life and death ==
After serving as Governor-General, Forster became President of the Big Brother Movement, encouraging emigration from Great Britain to Australia. Also an ardent supporter of ANZAC veterans, with many of whom he kept in touch and supported through his association with Toc H, he was a founding member of its organisation in Australia. He held the directorships of three Australian financial institutions: Australian Mercantile Land & Finance, Australian Mutual Provident Society and the English, Scottish & Australian Bank. Receiving a number of ceremonial and civic appointments in later life, Forster served as a County Alderman and magistrate for Hampshire holding the post of Verderer of the New Forest, where he resumed residence at the family seat, Lepe House, upon returning from Australia.

A talented golfer, captaining the Royal and Ancient Golf Club of St Andrews in 1917, Forster also took a keen interest in horse racing and yachting. A long-time member of the Royal Yacht Squadron, he raced his yacht Mona during Cowes Week, winning on at least one occasion. The Forster Cup, a yachting competition in Australia, was named after him.

Forster suffered from coronary-vascular disease later in life. After surgery in early January 1936, he failed to recover and died in a London nursing home a fortnight later on 15 January 1936, aged 69. Forster was cremated, with his ashes being placed at St Katharine's Church, Exbury in Hampshire. Among those attending his memorial service were Sir Victor Warrender, Finance Member of the Army Council, and Rear-Admiral Arthur Bromley, representing the Royal Navy.

The title became extinct in 1936, when Lord Forster died without surviving male issue, having lost both his sons during the Great War.

== Family life ==
Forster married the Hon. Rachel Cecily Douglas-Scott-Montagu (1868–1962), only daughter of the 1st Baron Montagu of Beaulieu, on 3 June 1890. Lady Forster GBE, DStJ, survived him by 26 years, dying on 12 April 1962, aged 93. With two sons who died in WWI, they also had two daughters:

- 2Lt. John Forster (1893–1914);
- Lieut. Alfred Henry Forster (1898–1919);
- Hon. Dorothy Charlotte Forster (1891–1983), widow of Captain the Hon. Harold Fox Pitt Lubbock, married secondly in 1923 Beaumont Pease, 1st Baron Wardington;
- Hon. (Emily) Rachel Forster (1896–1979), married in 1915 (divorce 1930) the anthropologist, George Lane Fox-Pitt-Rivers.

The Forster Memorial Park, named in memory of John and Alfred Forster, was donated to the Metropolitan Borough of Lewisham in 1922.

== Arms ==
Coat of arms of Lord Forster
Adopted 1919 (College of Arms) Coronet That of a Baron Crest A dexter Arm in Armour embowed grasping in the hand a broken tilting Lance Or the rerebrace charged with a Cross pattée Sable Escutcheon Argent on a Chevron between three hunting Horns Sable a Martlet Or Supporters Dexter, a 2nd Lieutenant of the King's Royal Rifle Corps, and Sinister, a Lieutenant of the 2nd Dragoons (Royal Scots Greys) both Proper Motto Fide et Fortitudine (By Fidelity and Fortitude) Other elements Surmounted by a Baron's coronet and the St Michael & St George circlet surrounding the Shield Other versions

== Works cited ==
- Craig, Fred W. S (1969). British Parliamentary Election Results, 1918-1949. Glasgow: Political Reference Publications. ISBN 0900178019 – via Internet Archive.
- Craig, Fred. W. S. (1989) [1974]. British Parliamentary Election Results 1885–1918 (2nd ed.). Chichester: Parliamentary Research Services. ISBN 0900178272.
- Foster, Joseph (1888–1891). Alumni Oxonienses: The Members of the University of Oxford, 1715-1886 . London: Reeves and Turner. OCLC 1088110 – via Wikisource.
- Hart, Bradley W. (2015). George Pitt-Rivers and the Nazis. London: Bloomsbury Academic. ISBN 1472569946 – via Internet Archive.
- Hesilrige, Arthur G. M. (1921). Debrett's Peerage and Titles of Courtesy. London: Dean & Son. OCLC 909816744 – via Internet Archive.

Parliament of the United Kingdom
Preceded by The Hon. Charles Mills	Member of Parliament for Sevenoaks; 1892–1918	Succeeded by Sir Thomas Bennett
New constituency	Member of Parliament for Bromley; 1918–1919	Succeeded by Cuthbert James
Political offices
Preceded by Harold Baker	Financial Secretary to the War Office; 1915–1919	Succeeded by Sir Archibald Williamson
Government offices
Preceded by Sir Ronald Munro Ferguson	Governor-General of Australia; 1920–1925	Succeeded by The Viscount Stonehaven
Peerage of the United Kingdom
New creation	Baron Forster; 1919–1936	Extinct
Sporting positions
Preceded by The Lord Hawke	President of Marylebone Cricket Club; 1919	Succeeded by The Earl of Ellesmere
