= 1945 Bromley by-election =

UK Parliamentary by-election

The 1945 Bromley by-election was held on 14 November 1945. The by-election was held due to the death of the incumbent Conservative MP, Edward Campbell, who had been elected at the general election in July of that year. It was won by the Conservative candidate, Harold Macmillan, who went on to become Prime Minister of the United Kingdom.

Bromley by-election, 1945 (Electorate 81,800)
Party	Candidate	Votes	%	±%
Conservative	Harold Macmillan	26,367	49.59	+4.68
Labour	Alexander Bain	20,810	39.14	+5.00
Liberal	Jaspar Carlisle Sayer	5,990	11.27	−10.50
Majority		5,557	10.45	−0.32
Turnout		53,167	70.00	−1.07
Conservative hold		Swing	-0.2	
