= Cycling Proficiency Test =

Test of safe cycling on public roads for UK children

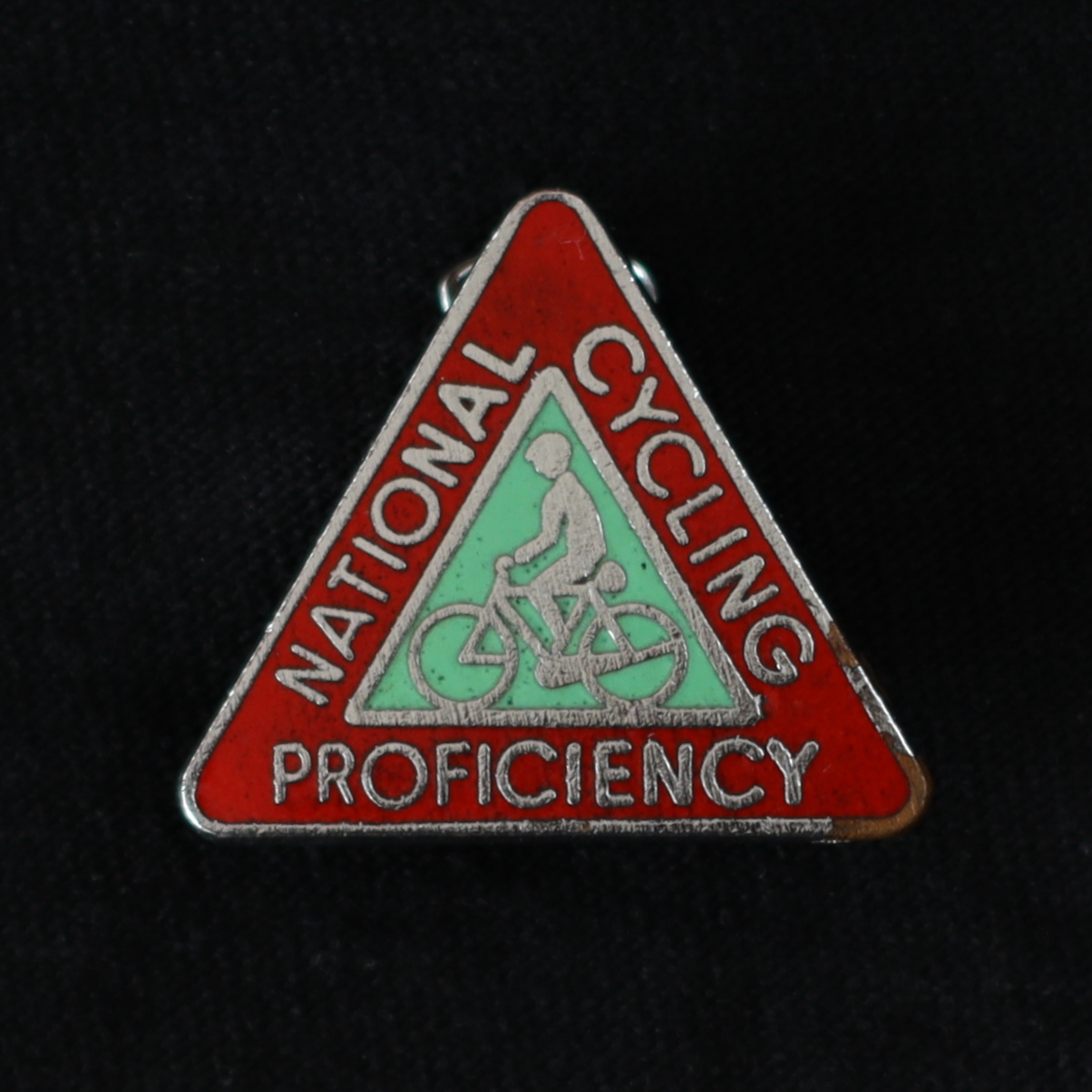
- Cycling proficiency badge awarded in the 1970s
- Type: Practical aptitude test
- Skills tested: Safe road cycling
- Purpose: Accident prevention
- Year started: 1958 (in Great Britain); mid-1970s (in Northern Ireland)
- Year terminated: 2007 (in England); 2010 (in Scotland)
- Regions: United Kingdom
- Annual number of test takers: 250,000 (in 1979) (Note: This figure from 1979 was the latest known number of child cyclists trained by the National Cycling Proficiency Scheme who took the Cycling Proficiency Test. Subsequent figures included children trained and tested by later schemes.)
- Prerequisites: Child aged 9–10 years

From 1958, the Cycling Proficiency Test was offered to children aged 9–10 years in Great Britain. It assessed a child's potential for riding a bicycle safely on public roads. Under the National Cycling Proficiency Scheme (NCPS), children were taught theory from The Highway Code. They were then instructed in riding a set of manoeuvres to be assessed by the test. Instruction and the test were usually held on simulated roads laid out on a school playground. A Cycling Proficiency Scheme was offered in Northern Ireland from the mid-1970s.

Child cycle training was delivered by local authorities. The 1980s and 1990s saw the emergence of cycling awareness schemes based on problem solving instead of instruction. By the mid-1990s, some authorities had replaced the NCPS with another scheme.

The Bikeability programme was developed in the 2000s. By 2010, Bikeability had replaced the NCPS and other schemes in England and Scotland. As of 2026, schemes similar to the NCPS are still offered throughout Northern Ireland and by some local authorities in Wales.

== History ==
=== Early years (1930s–1957) ===
In the 1930s, cycling groups started to lobby the UK government to train schoolchildren in riding their bicycles safely on public roads. The Royal Society for the Prevention of Accidents (RoSPA) responded by developing the Cycling Proficiency Test.

On 7 October 1947, seven children took the first test indoors at a RoSPA road safety conference. In 1957, 37,000 children passed the test.

=== National scheme (1958–1979) ===
In 1958, the government funded the launch of the National Cycling Proficiency Scheme (NCPS) in Great Britain. (Note: The Royal Society for the Prevention of Accidents (RoSPA) developed the National Cycling Proficiency Scheme. According to them, it was launched in 1958, but sources from other organisations gave different years: 1947 or 1959.) Local authorities delivered the scheme to children aged nine years and over.

NCPS students were taught parts of The Highway Code related to cycling. They were then instructed in how to ride a set of manoeuvres safely including turning left, turning right across another lane (the UK has left-hand traffic) and overtaking parked vehicles. The test assessed a student on riding the manoeuvres. Most authorities held instruction and the test on simulated roads laid out on school playgrounds. But some included riding on public roads.

A Cycling Proficiency Scheme for Northern Ireland was launched in the mid-1970s, which trained children aged up to nine years.

A 1979 study concluded that NCPS training produced a significant and sustained improvement in the cycling performance of children. It also found that training on public roads was significantly more effective than on simulated roads. The study noted that about 250,000 children were receiving NCPS training each year.

=== Later schemes and decline (since 1980) ===
From the 1980s, new child cycle training schemes emerged. Many took a problem-solving approach called cycling awareness instead of the instruction approach of the NCPS. Among these was the Righttrack Cycling Awareness Programme co-developed by RoSPA, who had developed the NCPS.

In 1996, a study evaluated eight schemes used by various local authorities. Four were NCPS variants, three were cycling awareness and one was cycling awareness with some instruction. Having confirmed the conclusions of the 1979 study, the 1996 one made two further conclusions. Firstly, training delivered over at least three weeks or in levels over a number of years was more effective at producing child cyclists assessed as safe than intensive training. Secondly, cycling awareness was more effective than instruction. The study also noted that "... between 275,000 and 300,000 children receive NCPS or similar training each year." and about 40% of children aged under twelve years had been trained.

By the mid-2000s, the proportion of children who had received cycle training was down to 25%. The newly developed Bikeability programme was described as cycling proficiency for the 21st century. England and Scotland replaced existing schemes, including the NCPS, with Bikeability in 2007 and 2010 respectively. Bikeability aligned with the National Standard for Cycle Training (NSCT) published in 2018.

Bikeability has three levels allowing children to progress from simulated roads to busy public roads with complex junctions and fast traffic once they reach secondary school. Cycling proficiency schemes are still offered in Northern Ireland and Wales although Welsh local authorities are replacing the NCPS with NSCT aligned programmes.
