= 1919 Bromley by-election =

UK Parliamentary by-election

- 17 December 1919
- Turnout: 48.9%
		Lab
Candidate	Cuthbert James	Francis Hodes
Party	Unionist	Labour
Alliance	Coalition
Popular vote	11,148	10,077
Percentage	52.5%	47.5%
Swing	▼27.0%	New
MP before election
Henry Forster
Unionist
Subsequent MP
Cuthbert James
Unionist

The 1919 Bromley by-election was held on 17 December 1919. The by-election was held due to the elevation to the peerage of the incumbent Coalition Conservative MP, Henry Forster. It was won by the Coalition Conservative candidate Cuthbert James.

Bromley by-election, 1919
Party		Candidate	Votes	%	±%
C	Unionist	Cuthbert James	11,148	52.5	–27.0
	Labour	Francis Hodes	10,077	47.5	New
Majority			1,071	5.0	–54.0
Turnout			21,225	48.9	–3.1
	Unionist hold		Swing	–37.2	
C indicates candidate endorsed by the coalition government.
