= Pen Hill =

Hill in Somerset, England

Coordinates: 51.23671°N 2.62590°W

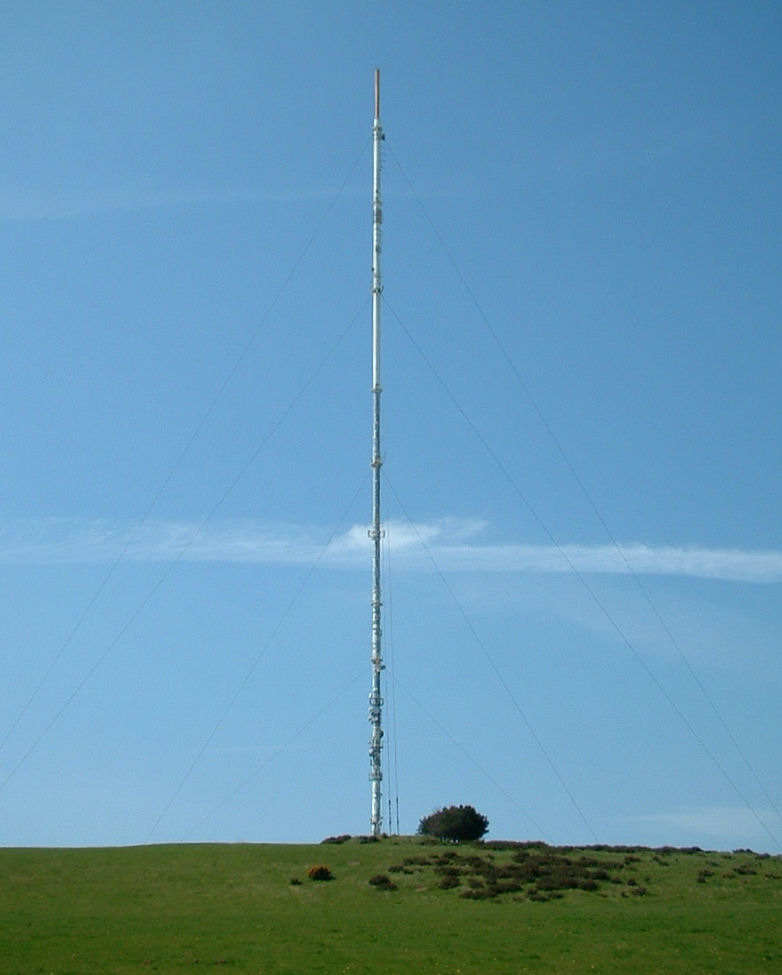
- Pen Hill and the Mendip TV Mast

Highest point
- Elevation: 305 m (1,001 ft)
- Prominence: c. 47 m

Geography
- Location: Mendip Hills, England
- OS grid: ST564488
- Topo map: OS Landrangers 182, 183

Pen Hill forms part of the Mendip Hills plateau in Somerset, England. The hill is located in St Cuthbert Out civil parish.

The name Pen is believed to be Celtic for hill or tor. It gives its name to one of the four periclines which underlay the geology of the hills.

The summit is 305 metres (1,001 ft) above sea level and is marked by an Ordnance Survey trig point. It is the second highest point on the Mendip Hills. Pen Hill is home to the Mendip TV Mast which is 281 metres (922 ft) high. Pen Hill provides views in all directions, particularly to the south, with views to the City of Wells and Wells Cathedral (approximately 2 miles (3.2 km) distant). On clear day it is often possible to see across Somerset to the Blackdown Hills, Quantock Hills and Brendon Hills.

There are ancient remains on the hill, in the form of a Neolithic Long barrow, which has been listed as Scheduled Ancient Monument, and a post medieval pillow mound thought to have been built specifically for rabbit breeding.
