= Bromley (constituency) =

Former parliamentary constituency in the United Kingdom

- Former borough constituency for the House of Commons
- Boundary of Bromley in Kent for the 1950 general election
- County: Kent (pre-1965); Greater London (post-1965)

1918–1974
- Seats: One
- Created from: Sevenoaks
- Replaced by: Ravensbourne (Majority), Chislehurst (Part)
- During its existence contributed to new seat(s) of: Beckenham (1950)

Bromley was a constituency represented in the House of Commons of the UK Parliament from 1918 to 1974. Its most famous Member of Parliament (MP) was Harold Macmillan, who held the seat from 1945 to 1964 and served as Prime Minister from 1957 to 1963.

Like all 20th-century such seats for geographic zones it elected one MP, using the first past the post system of election. It lay in Kent until 1965 and Greater London thereafter.

== Boundaries and boundary changes ==
Dates	Local authority	Maps	Wards
1918–1945	Municipal Borough of Bromley; Municipal Borough of Beckenham; Penge Urban District		The Borough of Bromley, and the Urban Districts of Beckenham and Penge
1945–1950	Municipal Borough of Bromley		Parts of the Boroughs of Bromley and Beckenham, and the Urban District of Penge.
1950–1974	Municipal Borough of Bromley (before 1965); London Borough of Bromley (after 1965)		The Borough of Bromley.

=== 1918–1945 ===
The constituency was formed primarily from the existing of constituency Sevenoaks

=== 1945–1950 ===
The constituency was subject to minor boundary changes.

=== 1950–1974 ===
The Urban Districts of Beckenham and Penge were transferred to the new constituency of Beckenham

=== Summary ===
The seat overspan the town of Bromley. As with the rest of south-east London these areas were in the far northwest of the Historic County of Kent – and was in the last such parts to join London, joining Greater London in April 1965.

The seat was abolished in the redistribution which took effect in 1974, largely replaced by the seat of Ravensbourne. The London Borough of Bromley (a larger area than the previous Municipal Borough) was, as to Westminster representation, split into four seats.

== History ==
This constituency consisted largely of prosperous leafy suburbia and was one of the Conservatives' strongest seats. The character of the area was one of prosperous small businesses, rather than commuting professionals.

Before 1918 this area was mostly the northern part of the Sevenoaks constituency. The first MP for this seat was Henry William Forster, the former member for Sevenoaks. In 1919 he was created the 1st Baron Forster and became Governor-General of Australia in 1920.

The next three MPs were first elected at by-elections (in 1919, 1930 and 1945 respectively).

In 1945 the sitting member died between the day of the election and the declaration of the result, so the opportunity arose for one of the Conservative former ministers defeated in the general election to return to the House of Commons representing an extremely safe seat. Future Prime Minister Harold Macmillan was selected by the Conservative Party to fight the seat. He was perhaps the most famous MP for Bromley, serving from the 1945 by-election until his retirement in 1964, when he was succeeded by John Hunt. Hunt held the seat (renamed Ravensbourne in 1974) until 1997.

== Members of Parliament ==
Election	Member	Party	Notes
1918	Henry Forster	Conservative	Member for Sevenoaks (1892–1918); Became ineligible following his elevation to the peerage as Baron Forster
1919 by-election	Cuthbert James	Conservative	Died in July 1930
1930 by-election	Edward Campbell	Conservative	Died in July 1945
1945 by-election	Harold Macmillan	Conservative	Member for Stockton-on-Tees (1924–1929, 1931–1945)
Constituency split, half merged with part of Orpington to form Beckenham
1950	Harold Macmillan	Conservative	Foreign Secretary (1955), Chancellor of the Exchequer (1955–1957), Prime Minister (1957–1963)
1964	John Hunt	Conservative	Contested Ravensbourne following redistribution
Feb 1974	Constituency abolished: see Ravensbourne		

== Election results ==
=== Elections in the 1910s ===
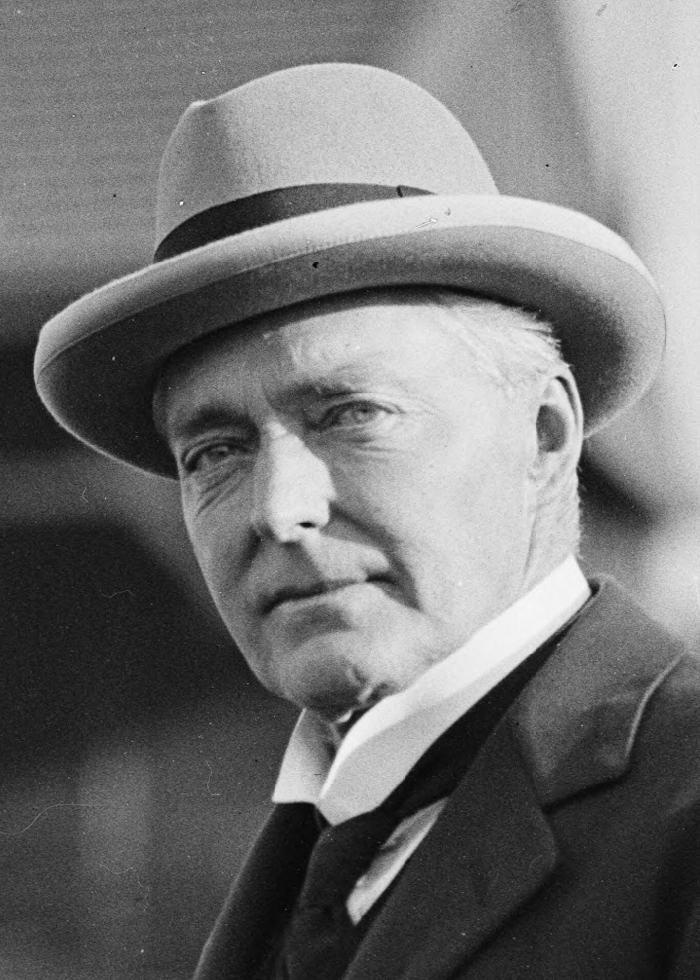
Henry Forster

General election 1918: Bromley
Party		Candidate	Votes	%
C	Unionist	Henry Forster	16,840	79.5
	Liberal	Holford Knight	4,339	20.5
Majority			12,501	59.0
Turnout			21,179	52.0
Registered electors			40,709	
	Unionist win (new seat)			
C indicates candidate endorsed by the coalition government.

1919 Bromley by-election
Party		Candidate	Votes	%	±%
C	Unionist	Cuthbert James	11,148	52.5	−27.0
	Labour	F P Hodes	10,077	47.5	New
Majority			1,071	5.0	−54.0
Turnout			21,225	48.9	−3.1
Registered electors			43,417		
	Unionist hold		Swing	−37.2	
C indicates candidate endorsed by the coalition government.

=== Elections in the 1920s ===
General election 1922: Bromley
Party	Candidate	Votes	%	±%
Unionist	Cuthbert James	16,803	54.8	−24.7
Liberal	Frank Griffith	9,128	29.8	+9.3
Labour	F P Hodes	4,735	15.4	N/A
Majority		7,675	25.0	−34.0
Turnout		30,666	66.3	+14.3
Registered electors		46,256		
Unionist hold		Swing	−17.0	

General election 1923: Bromley
Party	Candidate	Votes	%	±%
Unionist	Cuthbert James	13,495	44.8	−10.0
Liberal	Frank Griffith	12,612	41.9	+12.1
Labour	Glenvil Hall	3,992	13.3	−2.2
Majority		883	2.9	−22.1
Turnout		30,099	64.1	−2.2
Registered electors		46,976		
Unionist hold		Swing	−11.0	

General election 1924: Bromley
Party	Candidate	Votes	%	±%
Unionist	Cuthbert James	20,272	53.7	+8.9
Liberal	Frank Griffith	11,580	30.7	−11.2
Labour	Hubert Wallington	5,876	15.6	+2.3
Majority		8,692	23.0	+20.1
Turnout		37,728	78.6	+14.5
Registered electors		48,028		
Unionist hold		Swing	+10.1	

General election 1929: Bromley
Party	Candidate	Votes	%	±%
Unionist	Cuthbert James	25,449	47.2	−6.5
Liberal	Wilfred Fordham	18,372	34.1	+3.4
Labour	Albert Ashworth	10,105	18.7	+3.2
Majority		6,077	13.1	−9.9
Turnout		53,926	73.1	−5.5
Registered electors		73,785		
Unionist hold		Swing	−5.0	

=== Elections in the 1930s ===
1930 Bromley by-election
Party	Candidate	Votes	%	±%
Conservative	Edward Campbell	12,782	32.5	−14.7
Liberal	Wilfred Fordham	11,176	28.4	−5.7
United Empire Party	V C Redwood	9,483	24.1	New
Labour	Albert Ashworth	5,942	15.1	−3.7
Majority		1,606	4.1	−9.0
Turnout		39,383	53.4	−19.7
Registered electors		73,785		
Conservative hold		Swing	−4.5	

General election 1931: Bromley
Party	Candidate	Votes	%	±%
Conservative	Edward Campbell	47,077	83.6	+36.4
Labour	BB Gillis	9,265	16.4	−2.3
Majority		37,812	67.1	+38.7
Turnout		56,342	70.0	−3.1
Registered electors		80,499		
Conservative hold		Swing	+19.3	

General election 1935: Bromley
Party	Candidate	Votes	%	±%
Conservative	Edward Campbell	39,741	67.5	−16.1
Labour	Charles Kendall	11,800	20.0	+3.6
Liberal	Henry Banting	7,370	12.5	New
Majority		27,941	47.4	−19.7
Turnout		58,911	65.1	−4.9
Registered electors		90,532		
Conservative hold		Swing	−9.8	

=== Elections in the 1940s ===
General election 1945: Bromley
Party	Candidate	Votes	%	±%
Conservative	Edward Campbell	26,108	44.9	−22.5
Labour	Alexander Bain	19,849	34.1	+14.1
Liberal	Jaspar Sayer	12,177	20.9	+8.4
Majority		6,259	10.8	−36.7
Turnout		58,134	71.1	+6.0
Registered electors		81,800		
Conservative hold		Swing	−18.3	

1945 Bromley by-election
Party	Candidate	Votes	%	±%
Conservative	Harold Macmillan	26,367	49.6	+4.7
Labour	Alexander Bain	20,810	39.1	+5.0
Liberal	Jaspar Sayer	5,990	11.3	−9.7
Majority		5,557	10.5	−0.3
Turnout		53,157	60.6	−10.5
Registered electors		87,797		
Conservative hold		Swing	−0.2	

=== Elections in the 1950s ===
General election 1950: Bromley
Party	Candidate	Votes	%
Conservative	Harold Macmillan	23,042	57.3
Labour	J. R. Elliott	12,354	30.7
Liberal	Peter Grafton	4,847	12.0
Majority		10,688	26.6
Turnout		40,243	85.0
Registered electors		47,369	
Conservative win (new boundaries)			

General election 1951: Bromley
Party	Candidate	Votes	%	±%
Conservative	Harold Macmillan	25,710	65.4	+8.2
Labour	Thomas McKitterick	13,585	34.6	+3.9
Majority		12,125	30.9	+4.3
Turnout		39,295	81.0	−3.9
Registered electors		48,486		
Conservative hold		Swing	+2.1	

General election 1955: Bromley
Party	Candidate	Votes	%	±%
Conservative	Harold Macmillan	24,612	68.2	+2.8
Labour	Gerald Kaufman	11,473	31.8	−2.8
Majority		13,139	36.4	+5.6
Turnout		36,085	75.2	−5.8
Registered electors		47,954		
Conservative hold		Swing	+2.8	

General election 1959: Bromley
Party	Candidate	Votes	%	±%
Conservative	Harold Macmillan	27,055	70.0	+1.8
Labour	Albert Murray	11,603	30.0	−1.8
Majority		15,452	40.0	+3.6
Turnout		38,658	79.0	+3.7
Registered electors		48,937		
Conservative hold		Swing	+1.8	

=== Elections in the 1960s ===
General election 1964: Bromley
Party	Candidate	Votes	%	±%
Conservative	John Hunt	20,417	52.6	−17.4
Labour	Joseph Binns	9,090	23.4	−6.6
Liberal	William Shipley	8,650	22.3	New
Nuclear Disarmament	A James W Haigh	461	1.2	New
Socialist (GB)	Edmund Grant	234	0.6	New
Majority		11,327	29.2	−10.8
Turnout		38,852	77.8	−1.2
Registered electors		49,915		
Conservative hold		Swing	−5.4	

General election 1966: Bromley
Party	Candidate	Votes	%	±%
Conservative	John Hunt	20,117	52.3	−0.3
Labour	Donald Speakman	10,290	26.8	+3.4
Liberal	Peter Billenness	8,060	21.0	−1.3
Majority		9,827	25.5	−3.6
Turnout		38,467	77.7	−0.2
Registered electors		49,533		
Conservative hold		Swing	−1.8	

=== Elections in the 1970s ===
General election 1970: Bromley
Party	Candidate	Votes	%	±%
Conservative	John Hunt	22,364	59.4	+7.1
Labour	John Spellar	9,328	24.8	−2.0
Liberal	David Crowe	5,982	15.9	−5.1
Majority		13,036	34.6	+9.1
Turnout		37,674	69.3	−8.4
Registered electors		54,396		
Conservative hold		Swing	+4.5	

== See also ==
- List of former United Kingdom Parliament constituencies

Parliament of the United Kingdom
Preceded by Saffron Walden	Constituency represented by the chancellor of the Exchequer; 1955–1957	Succeeded by Monmouth
Preceded by Warwick and Leamington	Constituency represented by the prime minister 1957–1963	Vacant Title next held by Kinross and West Perthshire
