= Armature (sculpture) =

Framework around which a sculpture is built

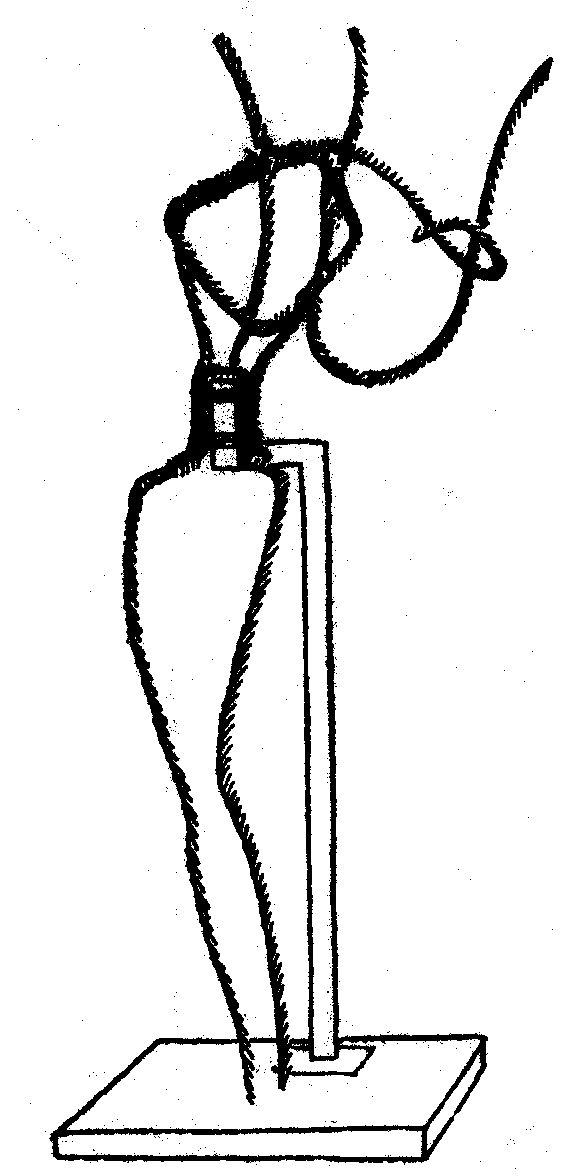
Armature for a classical pose of a figure holding a lyre.

In sculpture, an armature is a framework around which the sculpture is built, when the sculpture could not stand on its own. This framework provides structure and stability, especially when a plastic material such as wax, newspaper or clay is being used as the medium. When sculpting the human figure, the armature is analogous to the major skeleton and has essentially the same purpose: to hold the body erect.

An armature is often made of heavy, dark aluminium wire which is stiff, but can be bent and twisted into shape without much difficulty. The wire is affixed to a base which is usually made of wood. The artist then begins fleshing out the sculpture by adding wax or clay over the wire. Depending on the material and technique, the armature may be left buried within the sculpture but, if the sculpture is to be hollowed out for firing, it must^{1} be removed.

Large representational sculptures meant for outdoor display are typically fashioned of bronze or other types of sheet metal, and they require armatures for internal support and stability. For example, a large armature designed by Gustave Eiffel holds up the Statue of Liberty. The armature can be seen from below by visitors to the base of the sculpture's interior.

== Animation ==
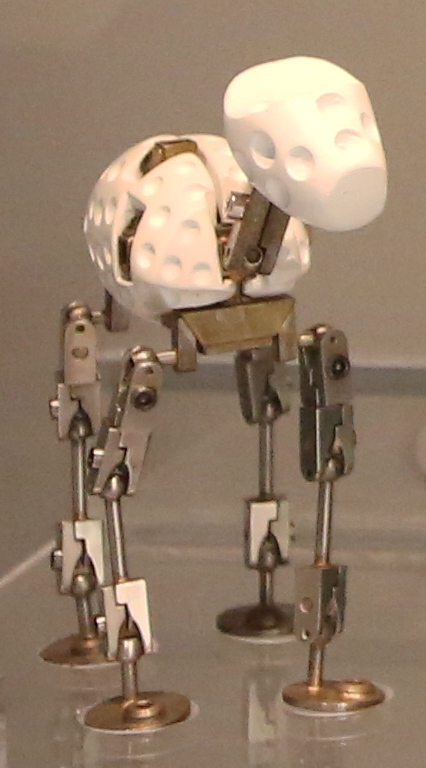
Armature for Gromit of Wallace and Gromit

An armature used in stop-motion animation is an articulated metal, wire or even wooden figure covered with material to build the character, but can be made to hold poses for extended periods of time.

In 3D computer animation, the analogous concept is the skeleton or rig used in skeletal animation.

== See also ==
- Lost wax

== Notes ==
^1 For this reason, much clay work for firing begins with a simple paper and/or wood armature. These materials can be removed relatively easily from finished piece while it is still fairly plastic, without damaging it. Any paper left behind will burn out in the kiln. A metal armature would expand in the heat and burst the piece.
