= 1916 St George's, Hanover Square by-election =

UK Parliamentary by-election

The 1916 St George's, Hanover Square by-election was held on 11 January 1916. The by-election was held due to the elevation to the peerage of the incumbent Conservative MP, Sir Alexander Henderson. It was won by the Unionist candidate Sir George Reid, the former Prime Minister of Australia, who acted as a spokesman for the self-governing Dominions in supporting the war effort. He was unopposed. There was a history of unopposed by-elections in the constituency and the War-time electoral pact meant that the other major parties would not endorse candidates in that election.

Sir George Reid was to die in 1918 triggering another unopposed by-election.

1916 by-election: St George's, Hanover Square
Party	Candidate	Votes	%	±%
Unionist	George Reid	Unopposed		
Unionist hold				
