= 1906 St George's, Hanover Square by-election =

UK Parliamentary by-election

The St George's, Hanover Square by-election of 1906 was held on 15 June 1906. The by-election was held due to the resignation of the incumbent Conservative MP, Heneage Legge. It was won by the Liberal Unionist candidate Alfred Lyttelton, who was elected unopposed.

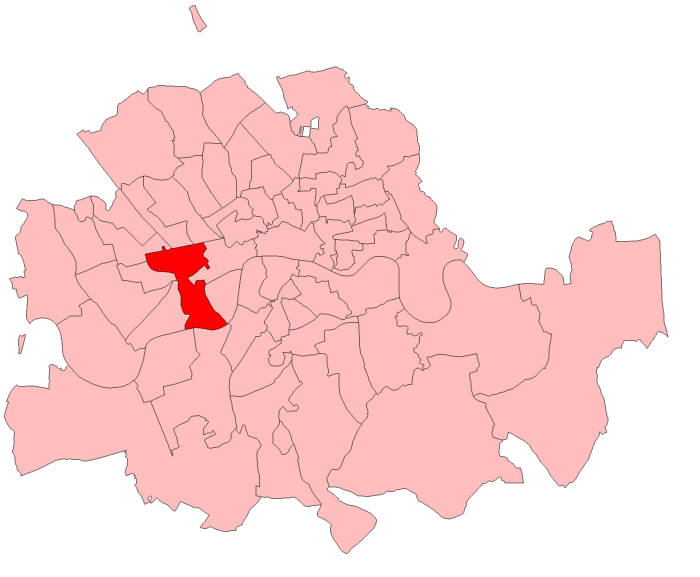
St George Hanover Square in 1906

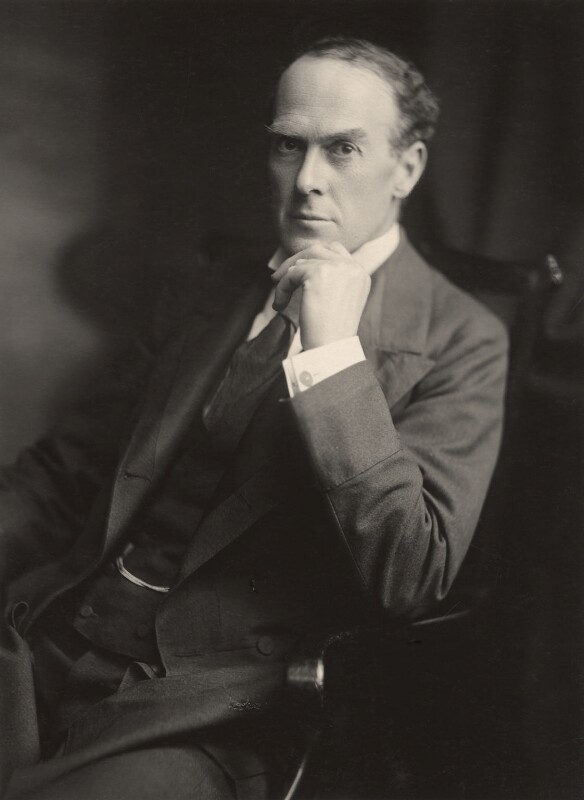
Alfred Lyttelton

== Previous result ==
General election 1906: St George's, Hanover Square
Party	Candidate	Votes	%	±%
Conservative	Heneage Legge	4,264	66.1	−9.0
Liberal	Manmath Chandra Mallik	2,191	33.9	+9.0
Majority		2,073	32.2	−18.0
Turnout		6,455	69.0	+16.8
Registered electors		9,359		
Conservative hold		Swing	−9.0	

== Result ==
1906 St George's, Hanover Square by-election
Party	Candidate	Votes	%	±%
Liberal Unionist	Alfred Lyttelton	Unopposed		
Registered electors				
Liberal Unionist hold				
