= St George Hanover Square (disambiguation) =

St George Hanover Square was a civil parish in the metropolitan area of London, England

St George Hanover Square could also refer to:

- St George's Hanover Square Church
- St George's, Hanover Square (UK Parliament constituency), renamed Westminster St George's (UK Parliament constituency)
