= 1887 St George's, Hanover Square by-election =

UK Parliamentary by-election

The 1887 St George's, Hanover Square by-election was held on 9 February 1887 following the resignation of the incumbent Conservative MP, Lord Algernon Percy. Percy vacated his Parliamentary seat by being appointed Steward of the Manor of Northstead on 31 January 1887.

== Candidates ==
The Liberal Unionist candidate was George Goschen. Goschen was Chancellor of the Exchequer. He had voted against Gladstone's Home Rule Bill in 1886 and became a Liberal Unionist. He subsequently lost his seat at Edinburgh East at the 1886 general election.

Lord Randolph Churchill resigned as Chancellor of the Exchequer on 22 December 1886. The Marquess of Salisbury appointed Goschen to the post on 14 January 1887. He became the sole Liberal Unionist in an otherwise Conservative government.

Goschen was therefore Chancellor outside the House of Commons. He first contested a by-election at Liverpool Exchange to return to the House, but was defeated by seven votes.

Following this defeat, Goschen received offers from Conservative Members of Parliament to resign their seats for Goschen.

Lord Algernon Percy put his safely Conservative seat at St George's Hanover Square at Goschen's disposal, an offer which Goschen accepted.

The Liberal Party candidate was James Haysman. Haysman had contested Brentford in the 1885 general election, the 1886 general election, and the December 1886 by-election.

== Result ==
1887 St George's Hanover Square by-election
Party	Candidate	Votes	%	±%
Liberal Unionist	George Goschen	5,702	78.7	N/A
Liberal	James Haysman	1,545	21.3	New
Majority		4,157	57.4	N/A
Turnout		7,247	65.4	N/A
Registered electors		11,079		
Liberal Unionist hold		Swing	N/A	
