= Westminster St George's =

Former UK parliamentary constituency

- Former borough constituency for the House of Commons
- County: County of London

1885–1950
- Seats: One
- Created from: Westminster
- Replaced by: Cities of London and Westminster

Westminster St George's, originally named St George's, Hanover Square, was a parliamentary constituency in Central London. It returned one Member of Parliament (MP) to the House of Commons of the Parliament of the United Kingdom, elected by the first past the post system of election.

== History ==
The constituency was created under the Redistribution of Seats Act 1885, and was then named "St George Hanover Square" after the parish of the same name.

It was renamed in 1918 as "Westminster St George's", and abolished in 1950.

== Boundaries ==
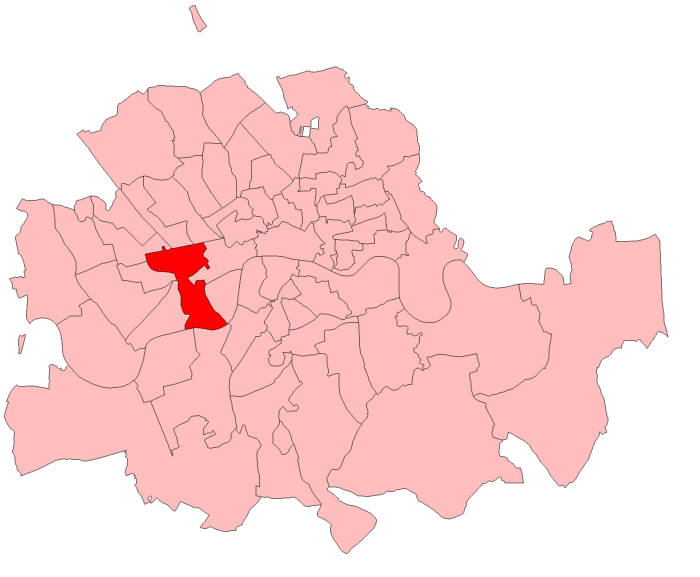
St George Hanover Square in the Metropolitan area 1885–1918

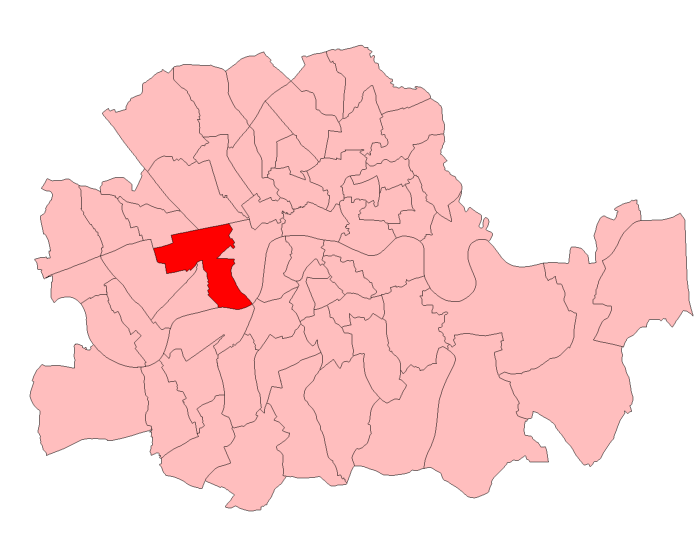
St George's in the Parliamentary County of London 1918–1950

Westminster Metropolitan Borough wards in 1916

=== 1885–1918 ===
From 1885 to 1918, when the constituency was known as St George Hanover Square, it was defined as being coterminous with the civil parish of the same name. In 1900 the parish was included for local government purposes in the area of the Metropolitan Borough of Westminster. This did not affect the name or boundaries of the constituency until 1918.

=== 1918–1950 ===
The Boundary Commission report of 1918 (Cd. 8756), at Schedule-Part II no. 78, defined the constituency as the following wards of the Metropolitan Borough of Westminster:

- Conduit: A small ward running from the top of Regent Street down through Hanover Square, the eastern side of Berkeley Square, and down to the Ritz on Piccadilly.
- Grosvenor: Covering the whole of Mayfair and the northern half of Hyde Park.
- Hamlet of Knightsbridge: The southern half of Hyde Park, together with Knightsbridge and part of the museums area north of South Kensington including the Royal Albert Hall.
- Knightsbridge St. George's: The area of Belgravia.
- Victoria: A very large ward running from Buckingham Palace south to include Victoria Station, and Pimlico.

The constituency also included "the part of the Charing Cross Ward which lies to the south and west of a line drawn from the ward boundary at the centre of Wellington Arch, along the middle of Constitution Hill, thence along the middle of the road to the north and east of the Queen Victoria Memorial, thence along the middle of Spur Road to boundary of St. Margaret Ward". This area included the remainder of the grounds of Buckingham Palace which were not in the Victoria Ward, but contained no electors. The boundary commissioners proposals were enacted by Schedule 9 of the Representation of the People Act 1918.

== Members of Parliament ==
| Year | Member | Party |
|---|---|---|
| 1885 | Lord Algernon Percy | Conservative |
| 1887 | George Goschen | Liberal Unionist |
| 1893 | George Goschen | Conservative |
| 1900 | Hon. Heneage Legge | Conservative |
| 1906 | Hon. Alfred Lyttelton | Liberal Unionist |
| 1912 | Hon. Alfred Lyttelton | Unionist |
| 1913 | Sir Alexander Henderson | Unionist |
| 1916 | Sir George Reid | Unionist |
| 1918 | Sir Newton Moore | Unionist |
| 1918 | Walter Long | Unionist |
| 1921 | James Erskine | Anti-Waste League/Independent Conservative |
| 1923 | James Erskine | Unionist |
| 1929 | Sir Laming Worthington-Evans | Unionist |
| 1931 | Duff Cooper | Conservative |
| 1945 | Arthur Howard | Conservative |
| 1950 | constituency abolished | |

== Elections ==
=== Elections in the 1880s ===
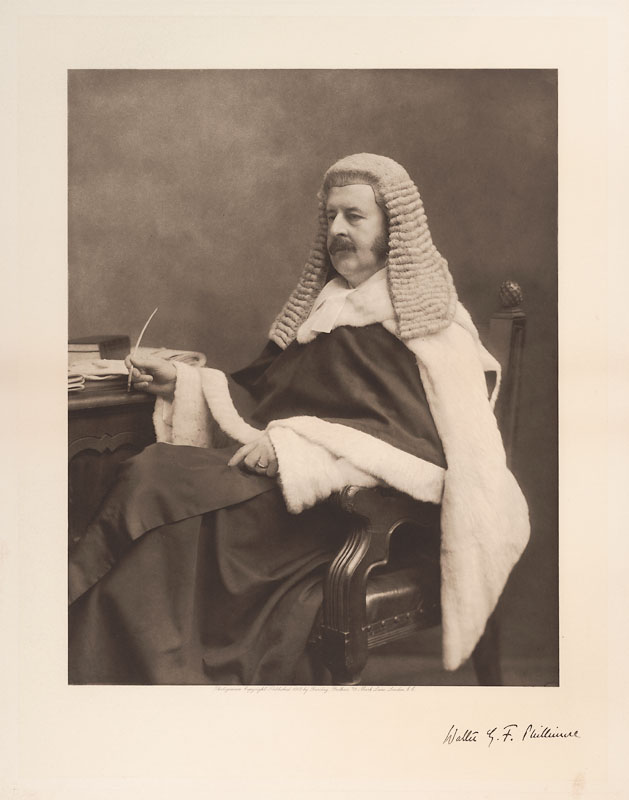
Phillimore

General election 1885: St George's, Hanover Square
| Party | Candidate | Votes | % |
|---|---|---|---|
| Conservative | Algernon Percy | 5,256 | 67.7 |
| Liberal | Walter Phillimore | 2,503 | 32.3 |
| Majority | | 2,753 | 35.4 |
| Turnout | | 7,759 | 73.9 |
| Registered electors | | 10,500 | |
| Conservative win (new seat) | | | |

General election 1886: St George's, Hanover Square
| Party | Candidate | Votes | % | ±% |
|---|---|---|---|---|
| Conservative | Algernon Percy | Unopposed | | |
| Registered electors | | | | |
| Conservative hold | | | | |

Percy's resignation caused a by-election.

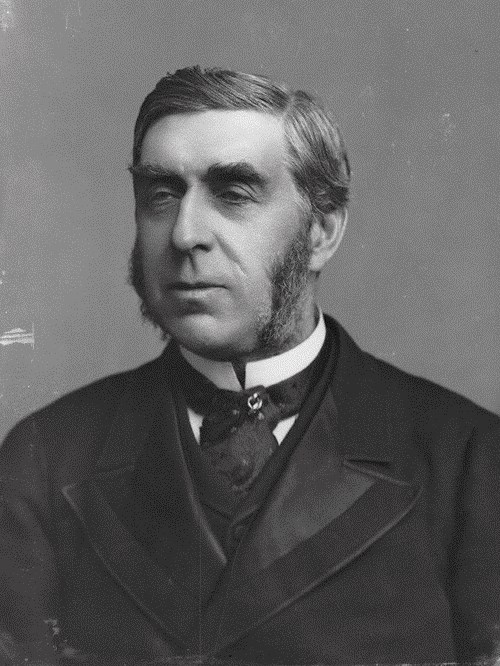
Goschen

1887 St George's, Hanover Square by-election
| Party | Candidate | Votes | % | ±% |
|---|---|---|---|---|
| Liberal Unionist | George Goschen | 5,702 | 78.7 | N/A |
| Liberal | James Haysman | 1,545 | 21.3 | New |
| Majority | | 4,157 | 57.4 | N/A |
| Turnout | | 7,247 | 65.4 | N/A |
| Registered electors | | 11,079 | | |
| Liberal Unionist hold | | Swing | N/A | |

=== Elections in the 1890s ===
General election 1892: St George's, Hanover Square
| Party | Candidate | Votes | % | ±% |
|---|---|---|---|---|
| Liberal Unionist | George Goschen | Unopposed | | |
| Registered electors | | | | |
| Liberal Unionist hold | | | | |

Goschen was appointed First Lord of the Admiralty, requiring a by-election.

1895 St George's, Hanover Square by-election
| Party | Candidate | Votes | % | ±% |
|---|---|---|---|---|
| Conservative | George Goschen | Unopposed | | |
| Registered electors | | | | |
| Conservative hold | | | | |

Goschen switched to the Conservatives to join the Carlton Club.

General election 1895: St George's, Hanover Square
| Party | Candidate | Votes | % | ±% |
|---|---|---|---|---|
| Conservative | George Goschen | Unopposed | | |
| Registered electors | | | | |
| Conservative hold | | | | |

=== Elections in the 1900s ===
General election 1900: St George's, Hanover Square
| Party | Candidate | Votes | % | ±% |
|---|---|---|---|---|
| Conservative | Heneage Legge | 3,852 | 75.1 | N/A |
| Liberal | William Everitt | 1,278 | 24.9 | New |
| Majority | | 2,574 | 50.2 | N/A |
| Turnout | | 5,130 | 52.2 | N/A |
| Registered electors | | 9,820 | | |
| Conservative hold | | Swing | N/A | |

General election 1906: St George's, Hanover Square
| Party | Candidate | Votes | % | ±% |
|---|---|---|---|---|
| Conservative | Heneage Legge | 4,264 | 66.1 | −9.0 |
| Liberal | Manmath Chandra Mallik | 2,191 | 33.9 | +9.0 |
| Majority | | 2,073 | 32.2 | −18.0 |
| Turnout | | 6,455 | 69.0 | +16.8 |
| Registered electors | | 9,359 | | |
| Conservative hold | | Swing | −9.0 | |

1906 St George's, Hanover Square by-election
| Party | Candidate | Votes | % | ±% |
|---|---|---|---|---|
| Liberal Unionist | Alfred Lyttelton | Unopposed | | |
| Registered electors | | | | |
| Liberal Unionist hold | | | | |

=== Elections in the 1910s ===
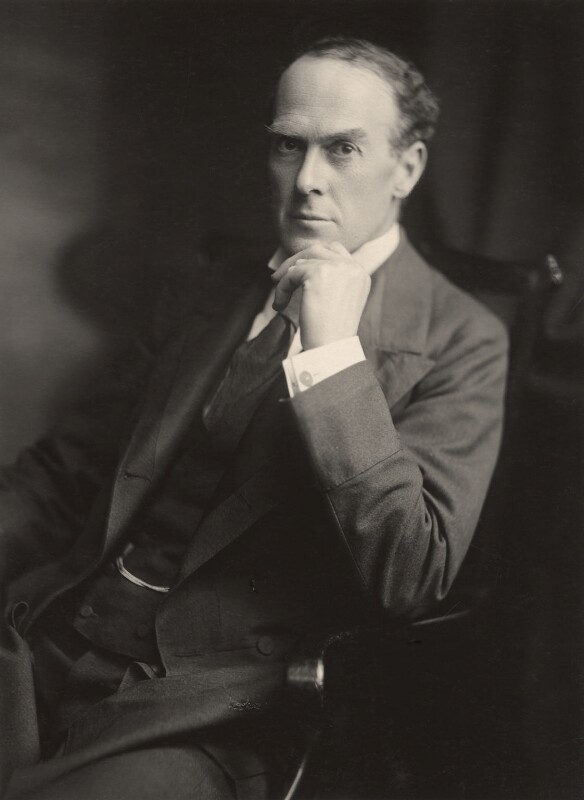
Lyttelton

General election January 1910: St George's, Hanover Square
| Party | Candidate | Votes | % | ±% |
|---|---|---|---|---|
| Liberal Unionist | Alfred Lyttelton | 5,383 | 78.6 | +12.5 |
| Liberal | Mackenzie Bell | 1,469 | 21.4 | −12.5 |
| Majority | | 3,914 | 57.2 | +25.0 |
| Turnout | | 6,852 | 76.5 | +7.5 |
| Registered electors | | 8,954 | | |
| Liberal Unionist hold | | Swing | +12.5 | |

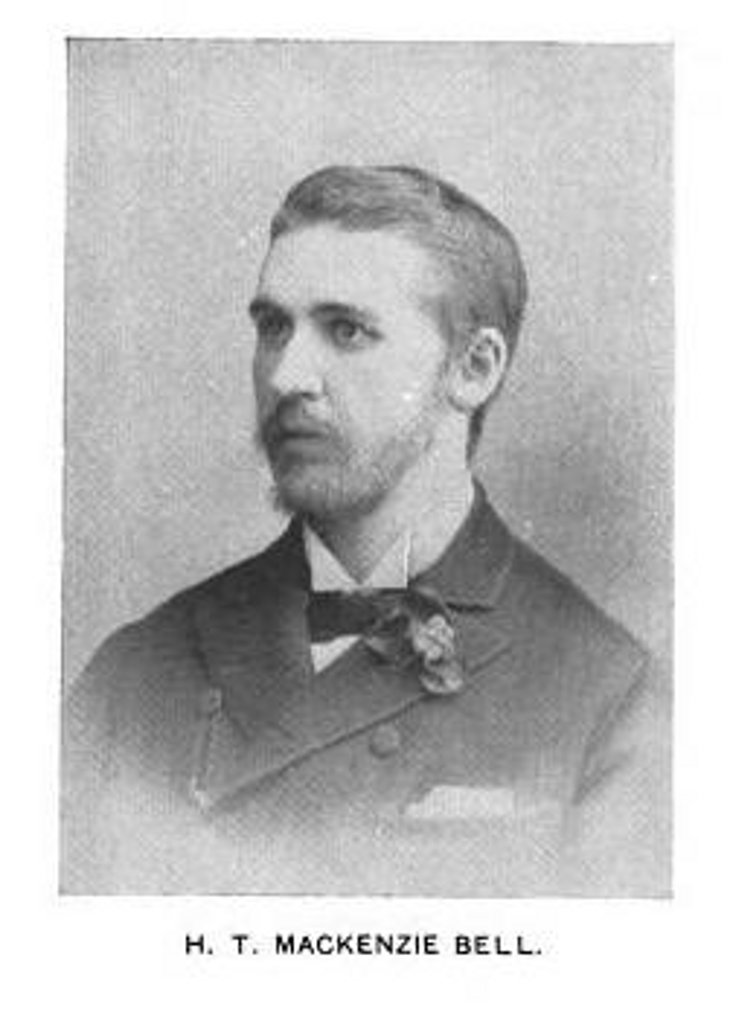
Bell

General election December 1910: St George's, Hanover Square
| Party | Candidate | Votes | % | ±% |
|---|---|---|---|---|
| Liberal Unionist | Alfred Lyttelton | 4,398 | 78.7 | +0.1 |
| Liberal | Mackenzie Bell | 1,188 | 21.3 | −0.1 |
| Majority | | 3,210 | 57.4 | +0.2 |
| Turnout | | 5,586 | 62.4 | −14.1 |
| Registered electors | | 8,954 | | |
| Liberal Unionist hold | | Swing | +0.1 | |

1913 St George's, Hanover Square by-election
| Party | Candidate | Votes | % | ±% |
|---|---|---|---|---|
| Unionist | Alexander Henderson | Unopposed | | |
| Registered electors | | | | |
| Unionist hold | | | | |

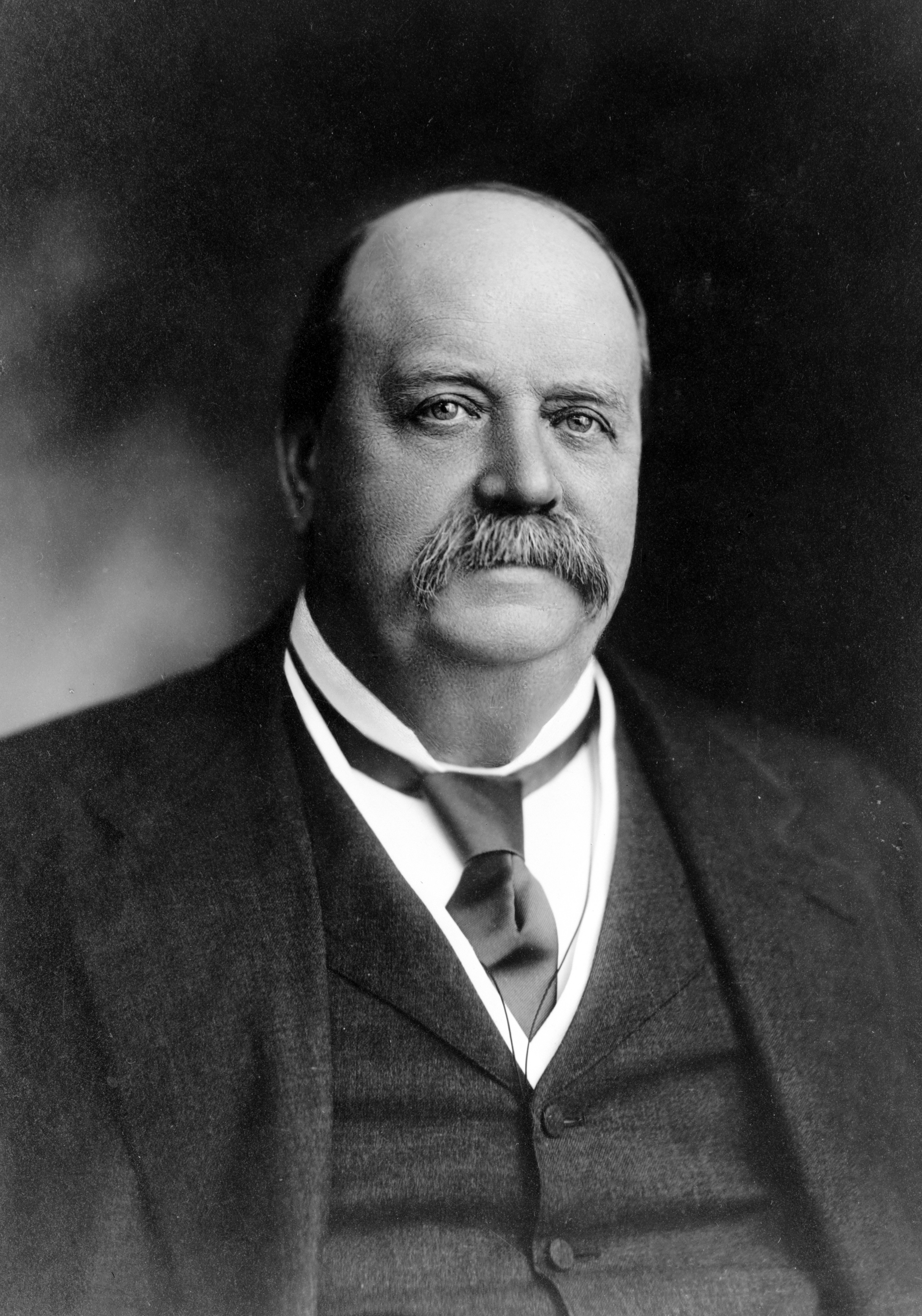
Reid

1916 St George's, Hanover Square by-election
| Party | Candidate | Votes | % | ±% |
|---|---|---|---|---|
| Unionist | George Reid | Unopposed | | |
| Registered electors | | | | |
| Unionist hold | | | | |

1918 St George's, Hanover Square by-election
| Party | Candidate | Votes | % | ±% |
|---|---|---|---|---|
| Unionist | Newton Moore | Unopposed | | |
| Registered electors | | | | |
| Unionist hold | | | | |

General election 1918: Westminster St George's
| Party | | Candidate | Votes | % | ±% |
|---|---|---|---|---|---|
| C | Unionist | Walter Long | 10,453 | 90.2 | +11.5 |
| | Liberal | Mackenzie Bell | 1,140 | 9.8 | −11.5 |
| Majority | | | 9,313 | 80.4 | +23.0 |
| Turnout | | | 11,593 | 39.9 | −22.5 |
| Registered electors | | | | | |
| | Unionist win (new boundaries) | | | | |
C indicates candidate endorsed by the coalition government.

=== Elections in the 1920s ===
1921 Westminster St George's by-election
| Party | | Candidate | Votes | % | ±% |
|---|---|---|---|---|---|
| | Anti-Waste League | James Erskine | 7,244 | 57.5 | New |
| C | Unionist | Herbert Jessel | 5,356 | 42.5 | −47.7 |
| Majority | | | 1,888 | 15.0 | N/A |
| Turnout | | | 12,600 | 39.8 | −0.1 |
| Registered electors | | | | | |
| | Anti-Waste League gain from Unionist | | Swing | | |
C indicates candidate endorsed by the coalition government.

Mary Allen

General election 1922: Westminster St George's
| Party | Candidate | Votes | % | ±% |
|---|---|---|---|---|
| Ind. Unionist | James Erskine | 11,252 | 55.9 | New |
| Unionist | Leslie Wilson | 7,559 | 37.6 | −52.6 |
| Liberal | Mary Sophia Allen | 1,303 | 6.5 | −3.3 |
| Majority | | 3,693 | 18.3 | N/A |
| Turnout | | 20,114 | 62.2 | +21.3 |
| Registered electors | | | | |
| Ind. Unionist gain from Anti-Waste League | | Swing | | |

General election 1923: Westminster St George's
| Party | Candidate | Votes | % | ±% |
|---|---|---|---|---|
| Unionist | James Erskine | Unopposed | | |
| Registered electors | | | | |
| Unionist gain from Ind. Unionist | | Swing | | |

General election 1924: Westminster St George's
| Party | Candidate | Votes | % | ±% |
|---|---|---|---|---|
| Unionist | James Erskine | Unopposed | | |
| Registered electors | | | | |
| Unionist hold | | Swing | | |

Worthington-Evans

General election 1929: Westminster St George's
| Party | Candidate | Votes | % | ±% |
|---|---|---|---|---|
| Unionist | Laming Worthington-Evans | 22,448 | 78.1 | N/A |
| Labour | Joseph George Butler | 6,294 | 21.9 | New |
| Majority | | 16,154 | 56.2 | N/A |
| Turnout | | 28,742 | 53.3 | N/A |
| Registered electors | | | | |
| Unionist hold | | Swing | N/A | |

=== Elections in the 1930s ===
1931 Westminster St George's by-election
| Party | Candidate | Votes | % | ±% |
|---|---|---|---|---|
| Conservative | Duff Cooper | 17,242 | 59.9 | −18.2 |
| Ind. Conservative | Ernest Petter | 11,532 | 40.1 | New |
| Majority | | 5,710 | 19.8 | −36.4 |
| Turnout | | 28,774 | 53.1 | −0.2 |
| Registered electors | | | | |
| Conservative hold | | Swing | | |

1931 general election: Westminster St George's
| Party | Candidate | Votes | % | ±% |
|---|---|---|---|---|
| Conservative | Duff Cooper | Unopposed | | |
| Registered electors | | | | |
| Conservative hold | | | | |

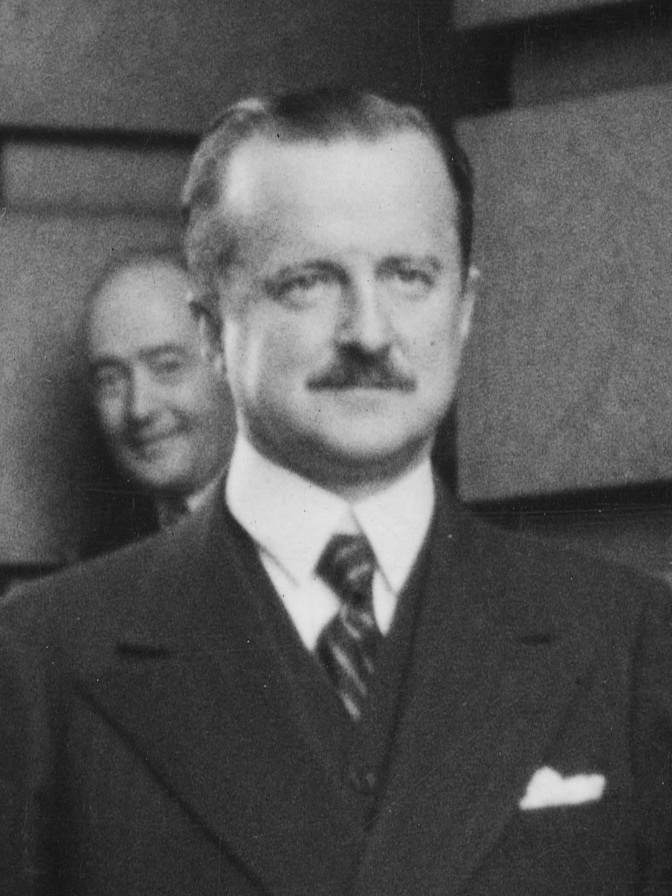
Duff Cooper

General election 1935: Westminster St George's
| Party | Candidate | Votes | % | ±% |
|---|---|---|---|---|
| Conservative | Duff Cooper | 25,424 | 84.6 | +6.5 |
| Labour | Anne Fremantle | 4,643 | 15.4 | −6.5 |
| Majority | | 20,781 | 69.2 | +13.0 |
| Turnout | | 30,067 | 55.2 | +1.9 |
| Registered electors | | | | |
| Conservative hold | | Swing | | |

=== Elections in the 1940s ===
General election 1945: Westminster St George's
| Party | Candidate | Votes | % | ±% |
|---|---|---|---|---|
| Conservative | Arthur Howard | 13,086 | 67.2 | −17.4 |
| Common Wealth | Wilfred Brown | 5,314 | 27.3 | New |
| Independent | Dorothy Crisp | 1,069 | 5.5 | New |
| Majority | | 7,772 | 39.9 | −29.3 |
| Turnout | | 19,469 | 57.2 | +2.0 |
| Registered electors | | | | |
| Conservative hold | | Swing | | |
