= 1921 Westminster St George's by-election =

UK Parliamentary by-election

1921 Westminster St George's
← 1918	7 June 1921	1922 →

Candidate	Erskine	Jessel
Party	Anti-Waste League	Unionist
Popular vote	7,244	5,356
Percentage	57.5%	42.5%
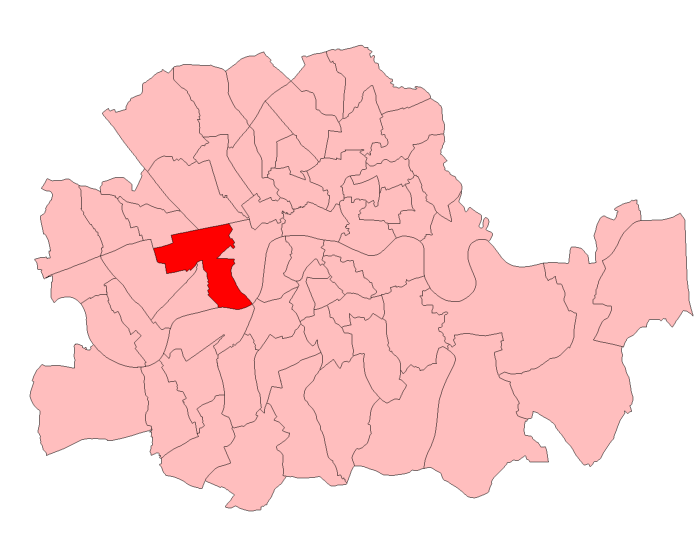
MP before election
Long
Unionist
Subsequent MP
Erskine
Anti-Waste League

The Westminster St George's by-election of 1921 was held on 7 June 1921. The by-election was held due to the elevation to the peerage of the incumbent Coalition Conservative MP, Walter Long. It was won by the Anti-Waste League candidate James Malcolm Monteith Erskine.

By-election 1921: Westminster St George's
Party		Candidate	Votes	%	±%
	Anti-Waste League	James Erskine	7,244	57.5	New
C	Unionist	Herbert Jessel	5,356	42.5	−47.7
Majority			1,888	15.0	N/A
Turnout			12,600	39.8	−0.1
	Anti-Waste League gain from Unionist		Swing		
C indicates candidate endorsed by the coalition government.
