= Alice in Wonderland (1966 TV film) =

1966 British film by Jonathan Miller

- Based on: Alice's Adventures in Wonderland by Lewis Carroll
- Written by: Jonathan Miller
- Directed by: Jonathan Miller
- Starring: John Gielgud; Peter Cook; Leo McKern; Peter Sellers; Michael Redgrave; Anne-Marie Mallik
- Music by: Ravi Shankar
- Country of origin: United Kingdom
- Original language: English

Production
- Producer: Jonathan Miller
- Cinematography: Dick Bush
- Editor: Pam Bosworth
- Running time: 72 minutes

Original release
- Release: 28 December 1966

Alice in Wonderland is a 1966 BBC television play, shot on film, based on Lewis Carroll's 1865 book Alice's Adventures in Wonderland. It was adapted, produced and directed by Jonathan Miller, then best known for his appearance in the satirical revue Beyond the Fringe.

Miller's production is unique among live-action Alice films in that he consciously avoided the standard Tenniel-inspired costume design and "florid" production values. Most of the Wonderland characters are played by actors in standard Victorian dress, with a real cat used to represent the Cheshire Cat. Miller justified his approach as an attempt to return to what he perceived as the essence of the story: "Once you take the animal heads off, you begin to see what it's all about. A small child, surrounded by hurrying, worried people, thinking 'Is that what being grown up is like?'"

Unlike many 1960s BBC productions, the play survived destruction, and was issued on DVD by both the BFI and the BBC.

== Cast ==
As credited, in order of appearance:

- Anne-Marie Mallik as Alice
- Freda Dowie as Nurse
- Jo Maxwell-Muller as Alice's sister
- Wilfrid Brambell as the White Rabbit
- Alan Bennett as the Mouse
- Finlay Currie as the Dodo
- Geoffrey Dunn as the Lory
- Mark Allington as the Duck
- Nicholas Evans as the Eaglet
- Julian Jebb as a Young Crab
- Sir Michael Redgrave as the Caterpillar
- John Bird as the Frog Footman
- Tony Trent as the Fish Footman
- Leo McKern as the Duchess
- Avril Elgar as the Peppercook
- Peter Cook as the Mad Hatter
- Michael Gough as the March Hare
- Wilfrid Lawson as the Dormouse
- Gordon Gostelow as 1st Gardener
- Tony Trent as 2nd Gardener
- Peter Eyre as the Knave of Hearts
- Alison Leggatt as the Queen of Hearts
- Peter Sellers as the King of Hearts
- Sir John Gielgud as the Mock Turtle
- Malcolm Muggeridge as the Gryphon
- David Battley as the Executioner
- Charles Lewson as the Foreman of the Jury
- Eric Idle (uncredited) as a member of the Caucus Race/the Queen's entourage/the Court Chorus
- Angelo Muscat (uncredited) as a Courtier/Juryman

== Production ==
Interiors were filmed at Netley Hospital, a mid-19th-century building that was demolished not long after the film was made. Also known as the Royal Victoria Military Hospital, Netley Hospital was the world's longest building at the time it was completed. Beach scenes with the Gryphon and the Mock Turtle were filmed at Pett Level in East Sussex. The courtroom scene was recorded at the BBC's Ealing Studios and involved the building of the largest set that Stage 2 at Ealing had ever seen.

In July 1966, the BBC spent three days at Donington Hall filming the "Pool of Tears" and the "Caucus Race" scenes for Jonathan Miller's production. The "Caucus Race" was filmed in the cellars.
