= Worthington-Evans baronets =

Extinct baronetcy in the Baronetage of the United Kingdom

The Worthington-Evans Baronetcy, of Colchester in the County of Essex, was a title in the Baronetage of the United Kingdom. It was created on 15 November 1916 for the Conservative politician Laming Worthington-Evans. The title became extinct on the death of his son, the second Baronet, in 1971.

== Worthington-Evans baronets, of Colchester (1916) ==
- Sir Laming Worthington-Evans, 1st Baronet (1868–1931)
- Sir (William) Shirley Worthington Worthington-Evans, 2nd Baronet (1904–1971)

Coat of arms of Worthington-Evans of Colchester
Crest 1st, A lion regardant argent, the body charged with three crosses-moline Gules, and resting the dexter paw on a bundle of rods, also Gules (Evans); 2nd, A demi-goat Proper, charged on the shoulder with a saltire engrailed Argent (Worthington). Escutcheon Quarterly, 1st and 4th: Per pale Argent and Gules, a lion passant regardant between two fleurs-de-lis in chief and in base a bundle of rods banded, all Counterchanged (Evans); Azure, a saltire engrailed Argent, between three tridents, one in chief and two in fess Or (Worthington). Motto Libertas (Liberty)
