= 1931 Westminster St George's by-election =

UK parliamentary by-election

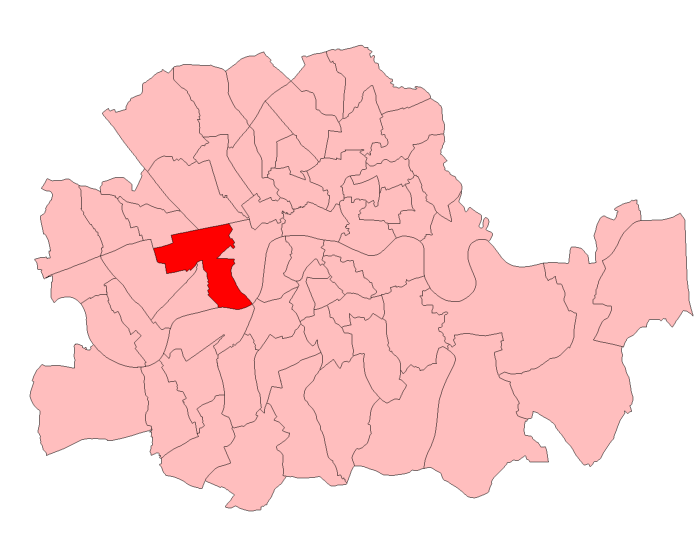
St George's in London in 1931

The Westminster St. George's by-election, 1931 was a parliamentary by-election held on 19 March 1931 for the British House of Commons constituency of Westminster St. George's.

== Vacancy and electoral history ==
The seat had become vacant on 14 February when the constituency's Conservative Member of Parliament (MP), Sir Laming Worthington-Evans, died aged 62. He had sat for the constituency since the 1929 general election, having previously been MP for Colchester since 1910; he had served in the cabinets of David Lloyd George and Stanley Baldwin during the 1920s.

Worthington-Evans

General election 1929: Westminster St George's
Party	Candidate	Votes	%	±%
Unionist	Laming Worthington-Evans	22,448	78.1	N/A
Labour	Joseph George Butler	6,294	21.9	New
Majority		16,154	56.2	N/A
Turnout		28,742	53.3	N/A
Unionist hold		Swing	N/A	

== Background ==
The by-election took place during a campaign, led by the press magnates Lord Beaverbrook and Lord Rothermere, to remove Stanley Baldwin as Leader of the Opposition. The vehicles for their campaign were the United Empire Party and the Empire Free Trade Crusade.

The campaign had had some success. The Conservative Central Office had withdrawn support for its own candidate at the 1929 Twickenham by-election, who supported the Empire Free Trade policy. The UEP had won the 1930 Paddington South by-election from the Conservatives. The split in the right-wing vote between Conservative and UEP candidates at the Islington East by-election in February 1931 had allowed Labour to hold a seat they had been expected to lose.

David Cannadine has argued that due to the actions of Beaverbrook and Rothermere now Baldwin's position as leader seemed to be becoming untenable and it was anticipated that he would resign as Conservative Party leader.

== Candidates ==
The industrialist Sir Ernest Willoughby Petter announced his candidacy on 28 February as an Independent Conservative opposed to Baldwin's leadership of the Conservative Party. Petter had founded the Petters Limited engineering company from which Westland Aircraft was separated in 1915. Though he claimed to be free of party and running at the request of the electors, he was eagerly backed by the Beaverbrook and Rothermere papers, the Daily Express and Daily Mail.

The Conservatives originally selected John Moore-Brabazon. He withdrew on 28 February, saying he could not defend Baldwin. Baldwin, under pressure to resign as Leader of the Conservative Party, toyed with the idea of resigning his safe Worcestershire seat of Bewdley and contesting the by-election himself. On 1 March Baldwin called Neville Chamberlain to see him and the latter understood Baldwin intended to resign the leadership of the Conservative Party at once. However the same evening William Bridgeman urged Baldwin to remain as leader and suggested he contest the by-election. Further discussions with Chamberlain and other colleagues convinced him not to be the candidate, but also not to resign at least while the by-election was in progress.

The eventual Conservative candidate was Alfred Duff Cooper, who had been MP for Oldham from 1924 until his defeat in 1929. He had been Financial Secretary to the War Office from 1928 to 1929.

In 1929 there had been a Labour candidate for the constituency, but Labour did not contest the by-election.

== Campaign ==
One notable speech during the campaign was by Stanley Baldwin. At the Queen's Hall on 17 March he attacked the press proprietors, uttering the often-quoted words: "What the proprietorship of those papers is aiming at is power, and power without responsibility – the prerogative of the harlot through the ages". The latter phrase had been suggested to him by his cousin Rudyard Kipling. Cannadine who has highlighted the significance of the speech in the relationship between politicians and the press argued that comparing the press with a harlot was "devastating" especially "coming from Baldwin, whose public persona was that of an honest, decent Christian gentleman of unimpeachable character and integrity." The Glasgow Herald reported that "London has never seen anything quite like" Baldwin's speech and noted that it was the most "aggressive and bellicose speech" Baldwin had ever made.

== Result ==
Cooper won the by-election with 59.9% of the votes.

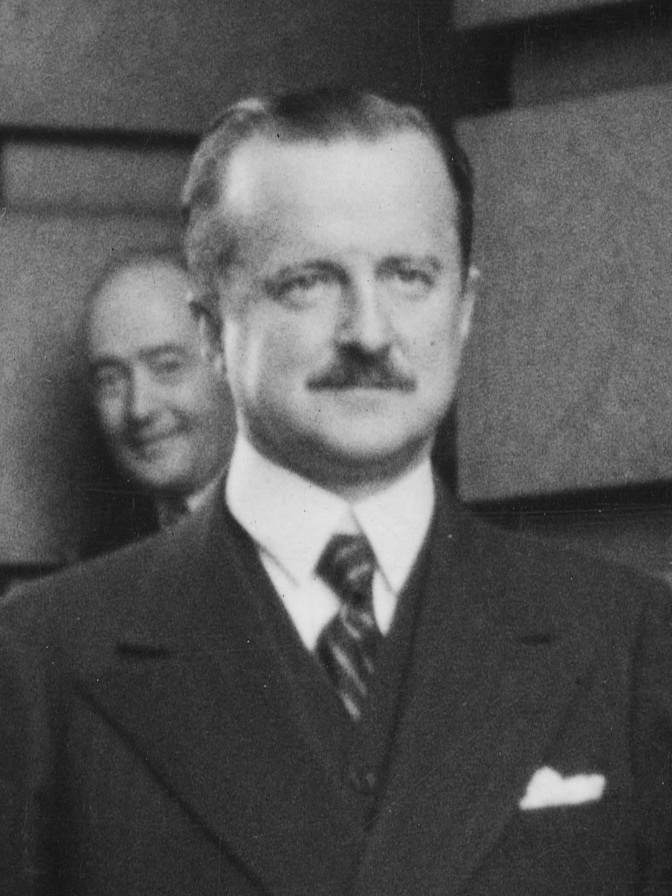
Duff Cooper

By-election 1931: Westminster St George's
Party	Candidate	Votes	%	±%
Conservative	Duff Cooper	17,242	59.9	−18.2
Ind. Conservative	Ernest Petter	11,532	40.1	New
Majority		5,710	19.8	−36.4
Turnout		28,774	53.1	−0.2
Conservative hold		Swing		

== Aftermath ==
After the result was announced Duff Cooper said that his win had been "a great victory for the true interest of the Conservative Party" and said the lesson to be learned was that in the future the party must "stand together behind one leader".

The Conservative victory at the by-election was an important factor in Baldwin's retention of the Conservative Party leadership. Following the collapse later that year of the Labour Government, the Conservatives would unite with the Prime Minister Ramsay MacDonald to form the National Government, which enjoyed a landslide victory at the polls that autumn.

Cooper was unopposed at the general election later that year, and remained MP for the constituency until 1945.

== See also ==
- Westminster St. George's constituency
- List of United Kingdom by-elections
- United Kingdom by-election records
