= Anne-Marie Mallik =

British former child actress

Anne-Marie Mallik (born Barbara Anne-Marie Mallik; 10 September 1952, in Fordingbridge, Hampshire), later Anne-Marie Huxstep, is a British former child actress who played the title role in Jonathan Miller’s production for BBC Television of Alice in Wonderland which was broadcast on 28 December 1966. Alice, whom she played when she was thirteen, is her only known professional role.

== Mallik as Alice ==
Mallik is the daughter of barrister Jay Paul Mallik, son of Manmath Chandra Mallik.

Miller's adaptation of Lewis Carroll’s mid-19th century fantasy, with its star-studded cast and gothic and bohemian overtones, created quite a stir at the time. Miller had envisaged an Alice "with no stage experience, not very pretty but curiously plain, sallow and a bit priggish". After advertising the part, he cast Mallik within twenty minutes of meeting her, having asked her (as Mallik recalled) to recite the poem "You Are Old, Father William" which Alice performs for the Caterpillar. Miller's first impression of her was of a "rather extraordinary, solemn child" who proved to be "naturally expressive" and "not amused by anything [she was] surrounded by". In similar, though less complimentary, vein, the biographer of Peter Cook, who played the Mad Hatter, has described Mallik's Alice as "a sullen, pouting, pubescent with no sense of bewilderment", noting also that, in his view, "the whole piece was strangely lacking in either humour or fear".

Mallik's return to obscurity after Alice was such that, in 1986, the BBC had difficulty tracking her down to pay a repeat fee. She was, by then, a naval wife, living in Southsea, and was located only after a newspaper reader recognised a photograph of her. A DVD of Alice was released by the British Film Institute in 2003 and, in 2012, Mallik appeared in conversation with Miller (their first meeting since 1966) in a BBC Arena programme about Miller's life and work. Among other things, Mallik recalled that, making Alice, she was not awed by the distinguished cast because she had been used to mingling with friends of her "much older" parents who had achieved distinction in their careers.

== Family and later career ==
Mallik married a naval officer named Roger Charles Huxstep. They had four children. Although she told Jonathan Miller in 2012 that she had been "hugely glad" to have played Alice, she never contemplated an acting career and went into banking.
