= Heneage Legge (St George's Hanover Square MP) =

British politician

Colonel The Honourable Heneage Legge (3 July 1845 – 1 November 1911) was a British soldier and Conservative politician.

Legge was the fifth son of William Legge, 4th Earl of Dartmouth, by his second wife the Honourable Frances, daughter of George Barrington, 5th Viscount Barrington. William Legge, 5th Earl of Dartmouth was his half-brother and the Right Reverend Augustus Legge his full brother. He attended Eton from 1857 until 1860.

Legge was a Captain in the Coldstream Guards and a Colonel in the 9th Lancers. At the 1900 general election he was returned to parliament for St George's Hanover Square. He was re-elected in January 1906, but resigned from the Commons on 11 June 1906 by accepting the post of Steward of the Chiltern Hundreds.

Legge died unmarried in November 1911, aged 66.

Parliament of the United Kingdom
Preceded by George Goschen	Member of Parliament for St George's Hanover Square; 1900–1906	Succeeded by Hon. Alfred Lyttelton
