= George Reid =

Prime Minister of Australia from 1904 to 1905

The Right Honourable Sir George Reid GCB GCMG KC
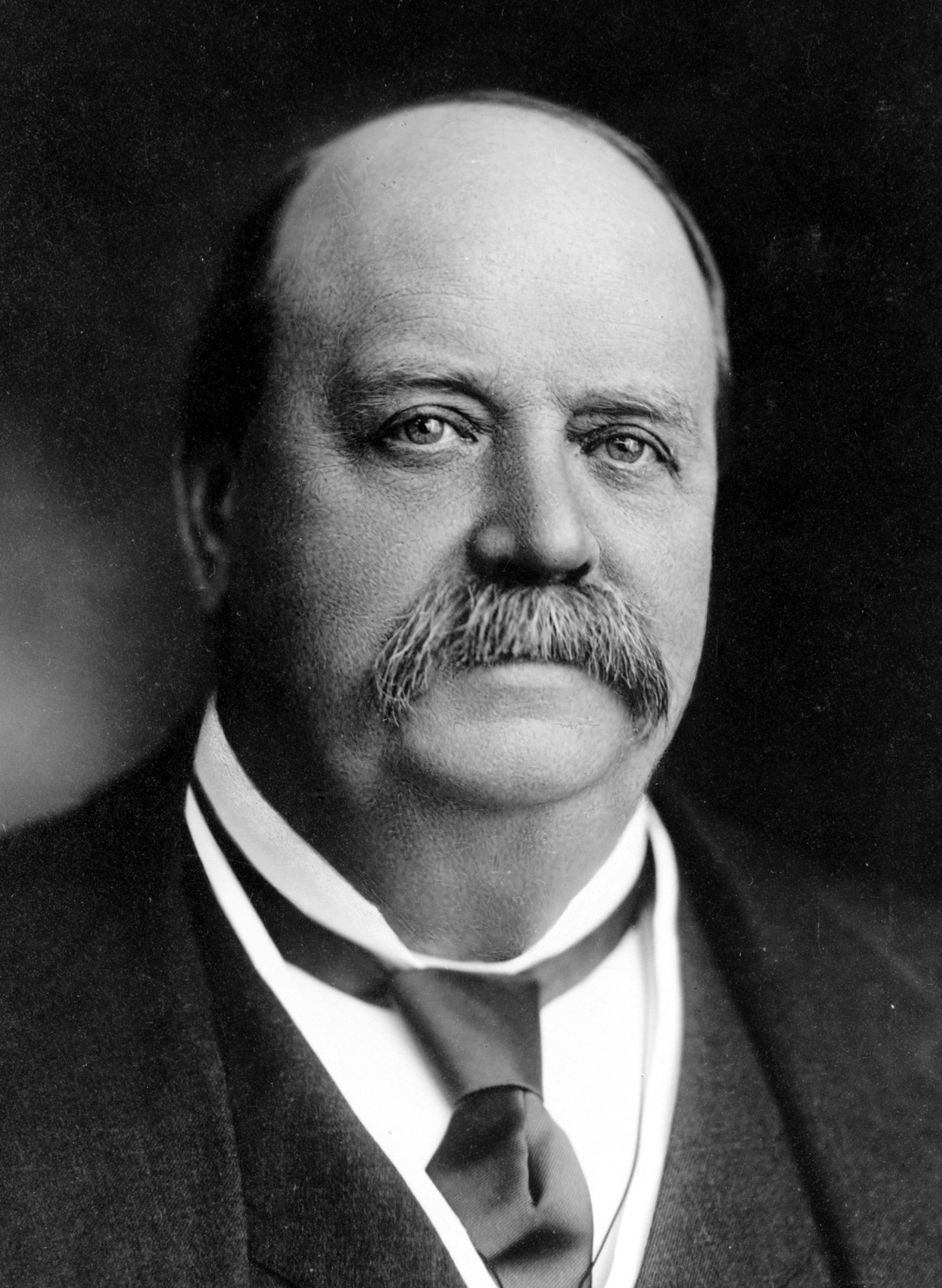

4th Prime Minister of Australia
- In office 18 August 1904 – 5 July 1905
- Monarch: Edward VII
- Governor-General: Lord Northcote
- Preceded by: Chris Watson
- Succeeded by: Alfred Deakin

Leader of the Opposition
- In office 7 July 1905 – 16 November 1908
- Prime Minister: Alfred Deakin; Andrew Fisher
- Preceded by: Chris Watson
- Succeeded by: Joseph Cook
- In office 19 May 1901 – 17 August 1904
- Prime Minister: Edmund Barton; Alfred Deakin; Chris Watson
- Preceded by: New position
- Succeeded by: Chris Watson

12th Premier of New South Wales
- In office 3 August 1894 – 13 September 1899
- Monarch: Victoria
- Governor: Sir Robert Duff; Lord Hampden
- Preceded by: George Dibbs
- Succeeded by: William Lyne

Leader of the Free Trade Party (Note: Known as the "Anti-Socialist Party" after 1906)
- In office 18 November 1891 – 16 November 1908
- Deputy: William McMillan; Dugald Thomson; Joseph Cook
- Succeeded by: Joseph Cook

Australian High Commissioner to the United Kingdom
- In office 1 January 1910 – 1 January 1916
- Preceded by: New position
- Succeeded by: Andrew Fisher

Member of the UK Parliament for St George's, Hanover Square
- In office 11 January 1916 – 12 September 1918
- Preceded by: Sir Alexander Henderson
- Succeeded by: Sir Newton Moore

Member of the Australian Parliament for East Sydney
- In office 4 September 1903 – 24 December 1909
- Succeeded by: John West
- In office 29 March 1901 – 18 August 1903
- Preceded by: Division created

Member of the New South Wales Parliament
- In office 3 August 1894 – 30 March 1901
- Preceded by: Constituency created
- Succeeded by: Ernest Broughton
- Constituency: Sydney-King
- In office 10 November 1885 – 3 August 1894
- Preceded by: George Griffiths
- Succeeded by: District abolished
- Constituency: East Sydney
- In office 14 December 1880 – 17 January 1884
- Preceded by: John Davies
- Succeeded by: Sydney Burdekin
- Constituency: East Sydney

Personal details
- Born: 25 February 1845 Johnstone, Renfrewshire, Scotland
- Died: 12 September 1918 (aged 73) London, England
- Resting place: Putney Vale Cemetery; 51.440426°N 0.239237°W
- Party: None (before 1887); Free Trade (1887–1909); Liberal (1909–1910); Conservative (UK)
- Spouse: Florence Brumby (m. 1891)
- Relations: Anne Fairbairn (granddaughter)
- Children: 3
- Parents: Rev. John Reid; Marion Reid (née Crybbace)
- Education: Scotch College
- Profession: Civil servant; barrister; diplomat; politician

Sir George Houston Reid (25 February 1845 – 12 September 1918) was the fourth prime minister of Australia, serving from 1904 to 1905. He held office as the leader of the Free Trade Party, previously serving as the 12th premier of New South Wales from 1894 to 1899, and later as the high commissioner of Australia to the United Kingdom from 1910 to 1916.

Reid was born in Johnstone, Renfrewshire, Scotland. He and his family emigrated to Australia when he was young. They initially settled in Melbourne, but moved to Sydney when Reid was 13, at which point he left school and began working as a clerk. He later joined the New South Wales civil service, and rose through the ranks to become secretary of the Attorney-General's Department. Reid was also something of a public intellectual, publishing several works in defence of liberalism and free trade. He began studying law in 1876 and was admitted to the bar in 1879. In 1880, he resigned from the civil service to run for parliament, winning election to the New South Wales Legislative Assembly.

From 1883 to 1884, Reid was Minister of Public Instruction in the government of Alexander Stuart. He joined the Free Trade Party of Henry Parkes in 1887, but refused to serve in Parkes' governments due to personal enmity. When Parkes resigned as party leader in 1891, Reid was elected in his place. He became premier after the 1894 election and remained in office for just over five years. Despite never winning majority government, Reid was able to pass a number of domestic reforms concerning the civil service and public finances. He was an advocate of federation and played a part in drafting the Constitution of Australia, where he became known as a strong defender of his colony's interests. In 1901, he was elected to the new Federal Parliament representing the Division of East Sydney.

Reid retained the leadership of the Free Trade and Liberal Association after federation, and consequently became Australia's first Leader of the Opposition. For the first few years, the Protectionist Party governed with the support of the Australian Labor Party. Alfred Deakin's Protectionist minority government collapsed in April 1904, and he was briefly succeeded by Labor's Chris Watson, who proved unable to govern and resigned after four months. As a result, Reid became prime minister in August 1904, heading yet another minority government. He included four Protectionists in his cabinet, but was unable to achieve much before his government was brought down in July 1905. One notable exception was the passage of the landmark Commonwealth Conciliation and Arbitration Act 1904, which dealt with industrial relations.

At the 1906 election, Reid secured the most votes in the Australian House of Representatives and the equal-most seats, but was well short of a majority and could not form a government. He resigned as party leader in 1908, after opposing the formation of the Commonwealth Liberal Party (a merger with the Protectionists). Reid accepted an appointment as Australia's first High Commissioner to the United Kingdom in 1910, and remained in the position until 1916. He subsequently won election to the House of Commons of the United Kingdom, serving until his sudden death two years later.

== Early life ==
Reid was born on 25 February 1845 in Johnstone, Renfrewshire, Scotland. He was the fifth of seven children born to Marion (née Crybbace) and John Reid; he had four older brothers and two younger sisters. He was named after George Houstoun, a former Conservative MP for the Renfrewshire constituency who had died a few years earlier. Reid's father, the son of a farmer, was born in Tarbolton, Ayrshire. At the time of George's birth, he was a minister in the Church of Scotland, which he had joined in 1839 after previously ministering in various secessionist Presbyterian churches; he remained loyal to the established church in the Disruption of 1843. In 1834, he had married the daughter of another minister, Edward Crybbace; she was about nine years his junior.

In April 1845, Reid and his family moved to Liverpool, England, where his father had been appointed minister of an expatriate Presbyterian congregation. His two younger sisters were born there. The family struggled financially, and his father made the decision to emigrate to Australia. Reid arrived in Melbourne in May 1852, and his father subsequently led congregations in Essendon and North Melbourne. He moved the family to Sydney in 1858. Reid received his only formal schooling at the Melbourne Academy, now known as Scotch College. He received a classical education, and in later life recalled that he had "no appetite for that wide range of metaphysical propositions which juveniles were expected to comprehend"; he found Greek a "lazy horror". He left school aged about 13, when the family settled in Sydney, and began working as a junior clerk in a merchant's counting house. At the age of 15, he joined the debating society at the Sydney Mechanics' School of Arts, and according to his autobiography, "a more crude novice than he had never begun the practise of public speaking". In Sydney, Reid's father became a colleague of John Dunmore Lang at the Scots Church, and then from 1862 until his death in 1867 was the minister of the Mariners' Church on George Street. His mother, who died in 1885, was involved in the ragged schools movement. In later life, Reid praised his parents for his good upbringing.

== Public service career ==
In 1864, Reid joined the New South Wales Civil Service as an assistant accountant in the Colonial Treasury, with an annual salary of £200. He was promoted to clerk of correspondence and contracts in 1868, and then chief clerk of correspondence in 1874 on a salary of £400. In 1876, he began to study law seriously, which would provide the independent income necessary to pursue a parliamentary career (given that parliamentary service was unpaid at the time). He became head of the Attorney-general's Department in 1878. In 1879, Reid qualified as a barrister. He made a name for himself by publishing pamphlets on topical issues. In 1875, he published his Five Essays on Free Trade, which brought him an honorary membership of the Cobden Club, and in 1878 the government published his New South Wales, the Mother Colony of the Australians, for distribution in Europe.

== Early political career ==
Reid's career was aided by his quick wit and entertaining oratory; he was described as being "perhaps the best platform speaker in the Empire", both amusing and informing his audiences "who flocked to his election meetings as to popular entertainment". In one particular incident his quick wit and affinity for humour were demonstrated when a heckler pointed to his ample paunch and exclaimed "What are you going to call it, George?" to which Reid replied: "If it's a boy, I'll call it after myself. If it's a girl I'll call it Victoria. But if, as I strongly suspect, it's nothing but piss and wind, I'll name it after you." His humour, however, was not universally appreciated. Alfred Deakin detested Reid, describing him as "inordinately vain and resolutely selfish" and their cold relationship would affect both their later careers.

Reid was elected top of the poll to the New South Wales Legislative Assembly as a member for the four-member electoral district of East Sydney in the 1880 New South Wales colonial election. He was not very active at first, as he was building up his legal practice, although he was concerned to reform the Robertson Land Acts, which had not prevented 96 land holders from controlling eight million acres (32,000 km^{2}) between them. Henry Parkes and John Robertson attempted to make minor amendments to the land acts but were defeated and at the subsequent election Parkes' party lost many seats.

The new premier, Alexander Stuart, offered Reid the position of Colonial Treasurer in January 1883, but he thought it wiser to accept the junior office of Minister of Public Instruction. He served 14 months in this office and succeeded in passing a much improved Education Act, which included the establishment of the first government high schools in the leading towns, technical schools (which became a model for the other colonies) and the provision of evening lectures at the university.

In February 1884, Reid lost his seat in parliament owing to a technicality; The Elections and Qualifications Committee held that the governor had already issued five proclamations prior to the appointment of Francis Suttor to the office of Minister of Public Instruction thus both Suttor and his successor Reid were incapable of being validly appointed. At the resulting by-election Reid was defeated by a small majority as a result of the government's financial hardships due to the loss of revenue from the suspension of land sales. In 1885, he was re-elected in East Sydney and took a great part in the free trade or protection issue. He supported Sir Henry Parkes on the free trade side but, when Parkes came into power in 1887, declined a seat in his ministry. Parkes offered him a portfolio two years later and Reid again refused. He did not like Parkes personally and felt he would be unable to work with him. When payment of members of parliament was passed, Reid, who had always opposed it, paid the amount of his salary into the treasury. Reid had become one of Sydney's leading barristers by impressing juries by his cross-examinations and was made a Queen's Counsel in 1898. In May 1891 four free traders, Reid, Jack Want, John Haynes and Jonathan Seaver, voted against the Fifth Parkes ministry in a motion of no confidence, which was only defeated by the casting vote of the Speaker of the New South Wales Legislative Assembly. Whilst the government survived the motion, parliament was dissolved on 6 June 1891.

== Premier ==
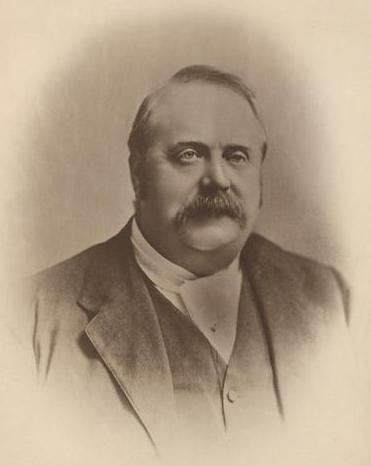
Reid in the 1890s

In September 1891, the Parkes ministry was defeated, the Dibbs government succeeded it, and Parkes retired from the leadership of the Free Trade Party. Reid was elected leader of the opposition in his place. He managed to form his party into a coherent group although it "ran the whole gamut from conservative Sydney merchants through middle-class intellectuals to reformers who wished to replace indirect by direct taxation for social reasons."

At the 1894 election Reid made the establishment of a real free trade tariff with a system of direct taxation the main item of his policy, and had a great victory. Edmund Barton and other well-known protectionists lost their seats, Labor was reduced from 30 to 18, and Reid formed his first cabinet. One of his earliest measures was a new lands bill which provided for the division of pastoral leases into two-halves, one of which was to be open to the free selector, while the pastoral lessee got some security of tenure for the other half. Classification of crown lands according to their value was provided for, and the free selector, or his transferee, had to reside on the property.

At an early stage of the session, Parkes pressed the question of federation, and in response Reid invited the premiers of the other colonies to meet in conference on 29 January 1895. This resolved in favour of an elected Australasian Federal Convention, that would draw up a federal constitution, which would then to be subject of a referendum in each colony. Meanwhile, Reid had great trouble in passing his land and income tax bills. When he did get them through the Assembly the New South Wales Legislative Council threw them out. Reid obtained a dissolution, was victorious at the polls, and heavily defeated Parkes for the new single-member electoral district of Sydney-King. He eventually succeeded in passing his acts, which were moderate, but was strenuously opposed by the council, and it was only the fear that the chamber might be swamped with new appointments that eventually wore down the opposition. Reid was also successful in bringing in reforms in the keeping of public accounts and in the civil service generally. Other acts dealt with the control of inland waters, and much needed legislation relating to public health, factories, and mining, was also passed. In five years he achieved more than any of his predecessors.

On four occasions between December 1895 and May 1899 Reid was temporarily appointed to the vacant position of Solicitor General for New South Wales to allow him to deputise for the Attorney General of New South Wales, Jack Want, in his absence. Reid took on the position of attorney-general in addition to being premier in the last months of his government.

== Federation ==
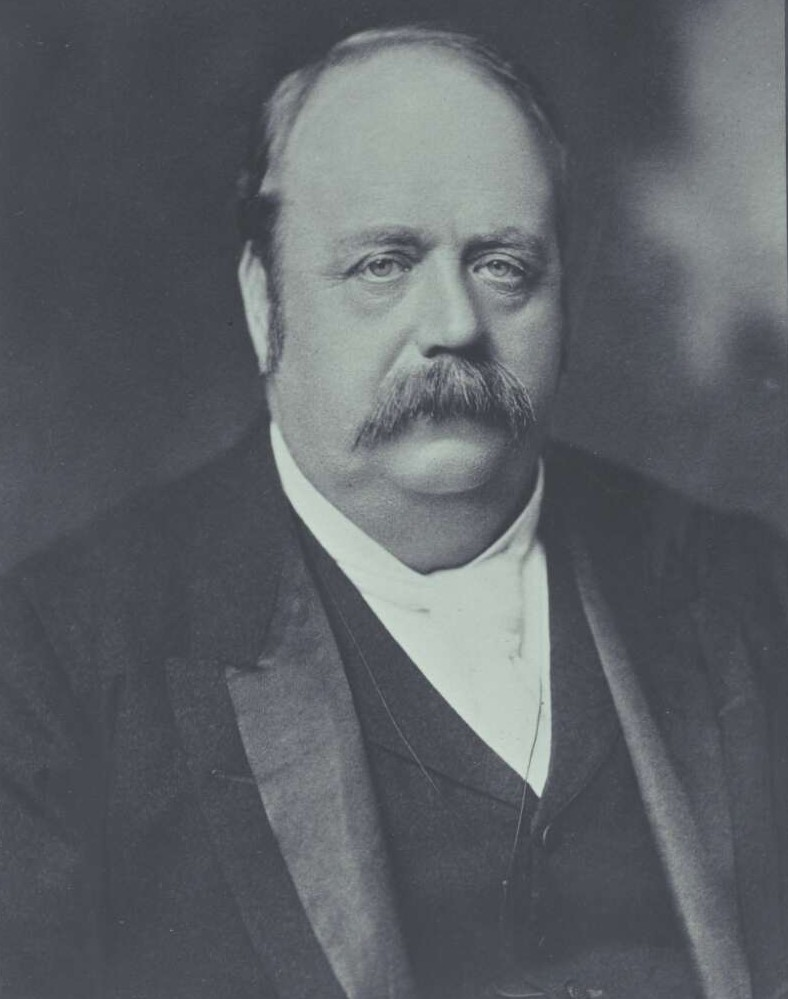
Reid at the 1898 National Australasian Convention

Reid supported the federation of the Australian colonies, but since the campaign was led by his Protectionist opponent Edmund Barton he did not take a leading role. He was dissatisfied by the draft constitution, especially the power of a Senate, elected on the basis of States rather than population, to reject money bills.

Following the Adelaide session in 1897 of the National Australasian Convention, Colonial Secretary Joseph Chamberlain sent the Colonial Office's extensive and sometimes critical comments on the current draft of the federal constitution to Reid (then in London for Queen Victoria's Diamond Jubilee), for his "private & independent" consideration. At the Sydney and Melbourne sessions of the convention in 1897 and 1898, Reid moved amendments based on those comments, covertly obtaining several concessions to British wishes. He denied a suggestion that he had been "talking with ‘Joe’". Reid did copy Chamberlain's comments to a select few other delegates, but they never revealed this. They included Edmund Barton, chair of the Drafting Committee, which accommodated some of Chamberlain's more technical points.

In the aftermath of the Convention, Reid made his famous "Yes-No" speech at Sydney Town Hall, on 28 March 1898. He told his audience that he intended to deal with the bill "with the deliberate impartiality of a judge addressing a jury". After speaking for an hour and three-quarters the audience was still uncertain about his verdict. He concluded by declaring "my duty to Australia demands me to record my vote in favour of the bill". Barton congratulated him on stage, but later he and other Federationists were frustrated by Reid saying that, while he felt he could not desert the cause, he would not recommend any course to the electors: "Now, I say to you, having pointed out my mind, and having shown you the dark places as well as the light places of this constitution, I hope every man in this country, without coercion from me, without any interference from me, will judge for himself." He consistently kept this attitude until the poll was taken on 3 June 1898. This earned him the nickname "Yes-No Reid". The referendum in New South Wales resulted in a small majority in favour, but the yes votes fell about 8000 short of the required 80,000. Subsequently, Reid was able to secure greater concessions for New South Wales.

"The Yes-No Federationist", The Bulletin 30 July 1898

At the general election held soon after, Barton challenged Reid in the premier's seat of Sydney-King. Reid was re-elected, receiving 761 votes to Barton's 651, but his party came back with a reduced majority. Reid fought for federation at the second referendum and it was carried in New South Wales, with 56.5 percent of valid votes cast for 'Yes'. "A bizarre combination of the Labor Party, protectionists, Federation enthusiasts and die-hard anti-Federation free traders" censured Reid for paying the expenses of John Neild who had been commissioned to report on old-age pensions, prior to parliamentary approval. Governor Beauchamp refused Reid a dissolution of parliament, and Reid was defeated in a no confidence motion, 75 to 41, in September 1899. By this time Reid had grown extremely overweight and sported a walrus moustache and a monocle, but his buffoonish image concealed a shrewd political brain.

== First federal parliament ==
=== 1901 election campaign ===
Reid was elected to the first federal Parliament as the Member for the Division of East Sydney at the 1901 Australian federal election. The Free Trade Party won 28 out of 75 seats in the Australian House of Representatives, and 17 out of 36 seats in the Australian Senate. Labor no longer trusted Reid and gave their support to the Edmund Barton Protectionist Party government, so Reid became the first Leader of the Opposition, a position well-suited to his robust debating style and rollicking sense of humour. In the long tariff debate Reid was at a disadvantage as parliament was sitting in Melbourne and he could not entirely neglect his practice as a barrister in Sydney, as his parliamentary income was less than a tenth of his income from his legal practice. In their old stronghold of New South Wales free traders had won 12 seats, but Labor won six, and the old compact between Labor and Reid was a thing of the past.

=== Leader of the Opposition, 1901–1904 ===
On 18 August 1903, Reid resigned (the first member of the House of Representatives to do so) and challenged the government to oppose his re-election on the issue of its refusal to accept a system of equal electoral districts. On 4 September he successfully contested the 1903 East Sydney by-election against a Labor opponent. He was the only person in Australian federal parliamentary history to win back his seat at a by-election triggered by his own resignation, until John Alexander in 2017. Weeks after the by-election, Barton resigned to accept a seat on the High Court and was replaced as prime minister by Alfred Deakin.

At the 1903 federal election, Reid again campaigned as "a champion of a policy of free trade", citing the tariff policy of the Barton Deakin governments as unsuccessful. The election resulted in a near three-way tie: the Free Traders emerged with 24 seats, while the Protectionists held 25 seats and the Australian Labor Party (ALP) led by Chris Watson emerged with 24 seats. Deakin compared the situation to a cricket game where there were "three elevens in the field instead of two". This analogy passed into common usage to describe the unstable party system in the first decade after Federation. Deakin continued in office as prime minister at the head of a minority government, primarily drawing on the support of the ALP, with Reid continuing as opposition leader and increasingly critical of Labor's role in propping up Deakin's government. However, in April 1904 the ALP and several Free Traders voted to amend the government's Conciliation and Arbitration Bill, which Deakin took as a motion of no confidence; Reid personally voted against the amendment. Deakin resigned as prime minister, with Watson succeeding him as Australia's first Labor prime minister.

After Deakin's defeat, Reid sought to negotiate an alliance or coalition with the Protectionists, with formal talks beginning in May 1904. He believed a "fiscal truce" was necessary between the two parties, with the question of free trade or protection to be put aside until the next election in order to remove Labor from office and guarantee stable government. The negotiations were unsuccessful, due to factional divisions within the Protectionists and unresolved questions over whether Reid or Deakin would lead a coalition government. However, when parliament resumed Watson alienated many Protectionists by attempting to enshrine trade union preference in the Conciliation and Arbitration Bill. Deakin continued to play kingmaker and a speech in August 1904 signalled that he was willing to vote down the Watson government.

== Prime Minister, 1904–1905 ==
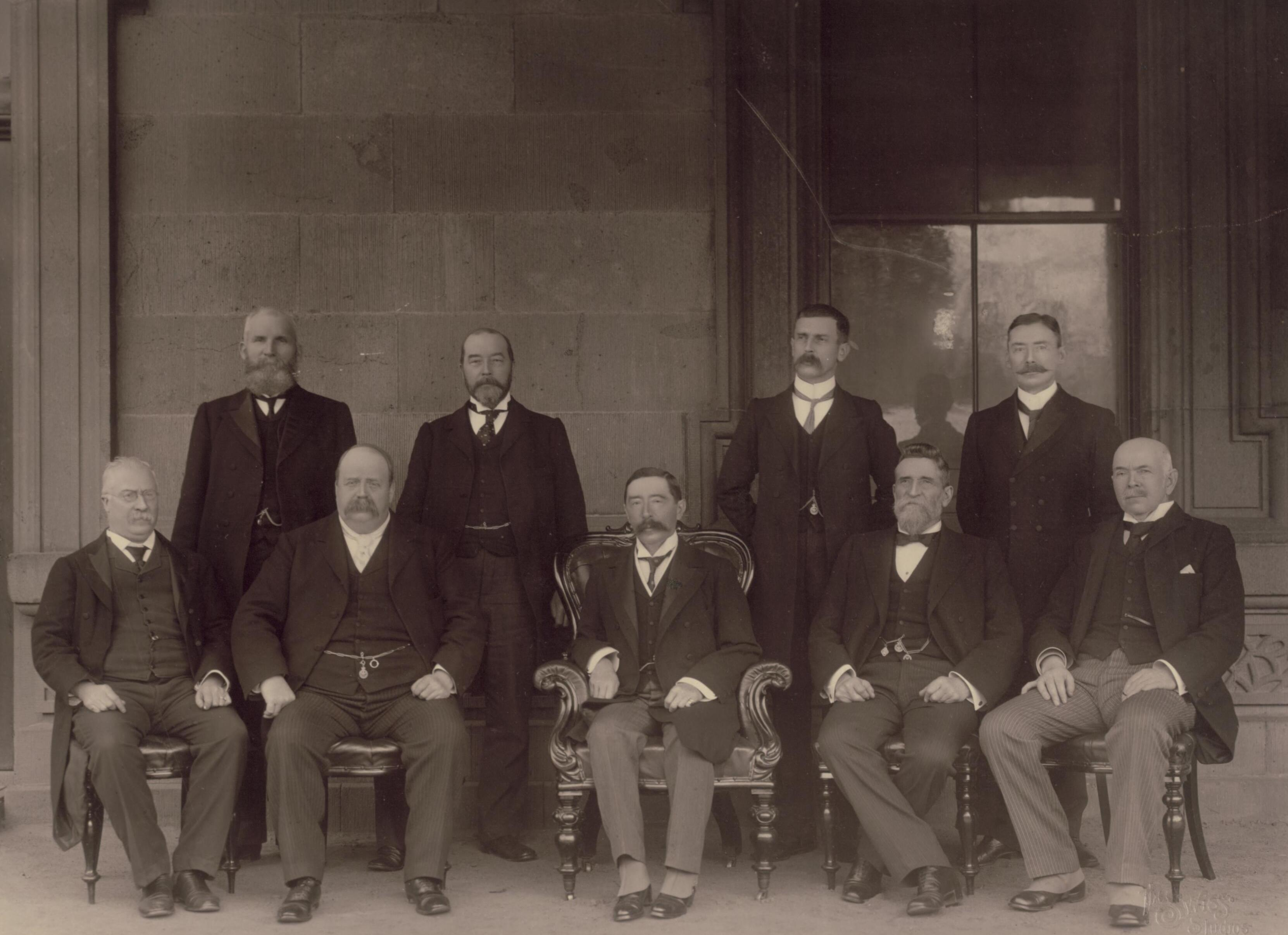
The Reid-McLean ministry with Governor-General Lord Northcote

=== Government formation ===
Reid was appointed prime minister on 18 August 1904, six days after the Watson government was defeated by 36 votes to 34 on a confidence motion. Watson attempted to call an early election but was refused a dissolution by Governor-general Lord Northcote, who instead called upon Reid as the third prime minister in the nine months since the 1903 election.

Reid was reliant on the support of Deakin and the Protectionists for his continuation in office, holding a minority both in the House and Senate. Rather than the full coalition government considered earlier in the year, Deakin gave approval for four designated Protectionists to join the new ministry. Former Victorian premier Allan McLean was the most senior Protectionist to take a portfolio and was given the second rank in cabinet, with the administration becoming known as the Reid–McLean government. Reid was forced to exclude several Free Traders from the cabinet, although it had considerable ministerial experience with McLean and George Turner also being former premiers. The formation of the government led to a split in the Protectionists, with around half supporting the government and the other half joining the Labor Party on the opposition benches.

=== Policy and legislation ===
In his first parliamentary speech as prime minister, Reid laid out a limited legislative agenda intended to avoid an immediate defeat of his government. This included passing of the previously postponed budget, reforms to electoral boundaries, and progression of the Conciliation and Arbitration Bill and Manufactures Encouragement Bill which had been introduced earlier in the parliament. Reid succeeding in passing the former as the Conciliation and Arbitration Act 1904, creating the Commonwealth Court of Conciliation and Arbitration and resolving a longstanding issue. With support from the other parties, he also passed significant amendments to the Defence Act 1903 which created a Military Board responsible to parliament.

Reid sought to defuse the tariff issue by appointing a royal commission in December 1904, comprising equal numbers of protectionists and free traders. His cabinet was credited with administrative reforms that increased the efficiency and independence of the Commonwealth Public Service, including the introduction of standard national procedures for departments inherited from the colonial public services and the removal of discretionary powers held by government ministers that had led to accusations of favouritism.

As with his predecessors, Reid appointed himself minister for external affairs and focused his government's external policy on the Pacific islands. He hoped to pass the Papua Bill, which had been introduced by the Watson government and provided for a new territory of Papua to succeed the interim Australian administration of British New Guinea. The bill failed to progress before parliament was prorogued in December 1904 but was later passed as the Papua Act 1905. Reid also sought to increase Australian influence over the New Hebrides, having previously supported their annexation as premier of New South Wales. His government secured additional funding for the shipping service provided by Burns, Philp & Co., but was unable to secure tariff relief for imports from the Australian settlers on the islands.

=== Prorogation and defeat ===
The House of Representatives was prorogued in December 1904 and would not be reconvened for another six months. During the parliamentary recess Reid continued to work in earnest to bring about a realignment and institute a two-party system, intending to unite the Free Traders and Protectionists under his leadership and present a united anti-socialist front against the Labor Party. He held a series of public meetings in support of his efforts and made repeated overtures to Deakin and other leading Protectionists, anticipating that he could call an early election if his unification efforts succeeded.

In early 1905, Reid's attorney-general Josiah Symon was involved in a spat with the three justices of the High Court over what Symon viewed as excessive expenditure on travel, accommodation and staffing. This culminated in threats by Chief Justice Samuel Griffith to suspend the court's activities and the release of correspondence to the press which reflected poorly on Symon. Reid's attempts to mediate resulted in a breakdown in his relationship with Symon, but with his government's insecure parliamentary status he considered it untenable to dismiss a minister. The dispute likely prejudiced Reid's unification attempts, as the High Court judges had close ties with the Protectionists.

Reid recalled parliament on 28 June 1905. Days earlier, Deakin had given a speech in Ballarat that was critical of Reid's anti-socialist campaign and rejected an early election as unwise; it implied the Protectionists would not continue to support the government and was widely reported as a "notice to quit". The throne speech drafted for Northcote to deliver effectively suspended the government's legislative agenda outside of an electoral redistribution, a clear signal that Reid intended to seek an early dissolution in response to Deakin's speech.

On 30 June 1905, the House of Representatives voted by 42 votes to 27 in favour of an amendment to the address-in-reply introduced by Deakin. This was taken by Reid as a motion of no confidence. He sought a dissolution from Northcote, but this was refused on the basis that the parliament was not due to expire for over a year and Deakin could command a majority in the House through a renewed alliance with Labor. Deakin succeeded Reid as prime minister on 5 July 1905.

== Leader of the Opposition, 1905–1908 ==
Reid adopted a strategy of trying to reorient the party system along Labor vs. non-Labor lines – prior to the 1906 election, he renamed his Free Trade Party to the Anti-Socialist Party. Reid envisaged a spectrum running from socialist to anti-socialist, with the Protectionist Party in the middle. This attempt struck a chord with politicians who were steeped in the Westminster tradition and regarded a two-party system as very much the norm. Zachary Gorman has argued that this attempt to impose clear 'lines of cleavage' in Federal politics was inspired by Reid's friend Joseph Carruthers who had achieved a political realignment in New South Wales that destroyed the Progressive middle party and created a Liberal-Labor divide. For Reid, anti-socialism was a natural product of his long-standing belief in Gladstonian liberalism.

Reid referred to Labor publicly using a damaging visual negative image of Labor as a hungry socialist tiger that would devour all. The anti-socialist campaign led to the Protectionist vote and seat count dropping significantly at the 1906 election, while both Reid's party and Labor won 26 seats each. The Deakin government continued with Labor support for the time being, despite only holding 16 seats after losing 10, although with another 5 independent Protectionists. Reid's anti-socialist campaign had nevertheless laid the groundwork for the desired realignment, and liberalism would come to sit on the centre-right of Australian politics.

=== Resignation and final years in parliament ===
In 1907–1908, Reid strenuously resisted Deakin's commitment to increase tariff rates. When Deakin proposed the Commonwealth Liberal Party, a "Fusion" of the two non-Labor parties, Reid resigned as party leader on 16 November 1908. The following day, Joseph Cook was made leader until the parties merged.

On 24 December 1909 Reid resigned from Parliament (he was the first Member to have resigned twice), however his seat was left vacant until the 1910 election. His seat of East Sydney was won by Labor's John West, in an election which saw Labor win 42 of 75 seats, against the CLP on 31 seats. Labor also won a majority in the Senate.

== Later life ==
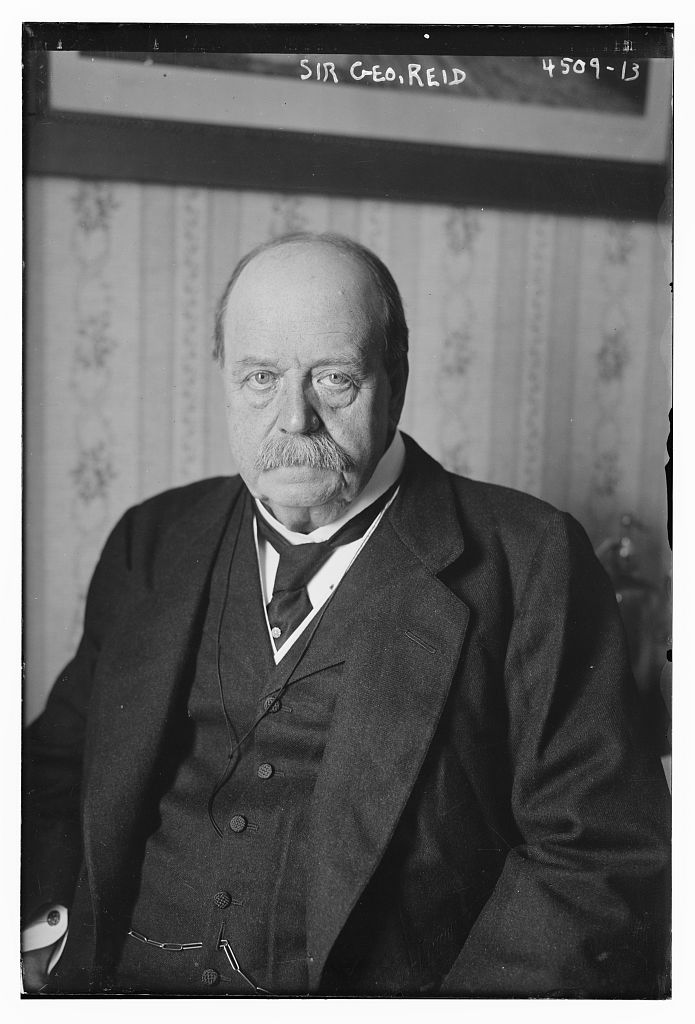
Reid c. 1915

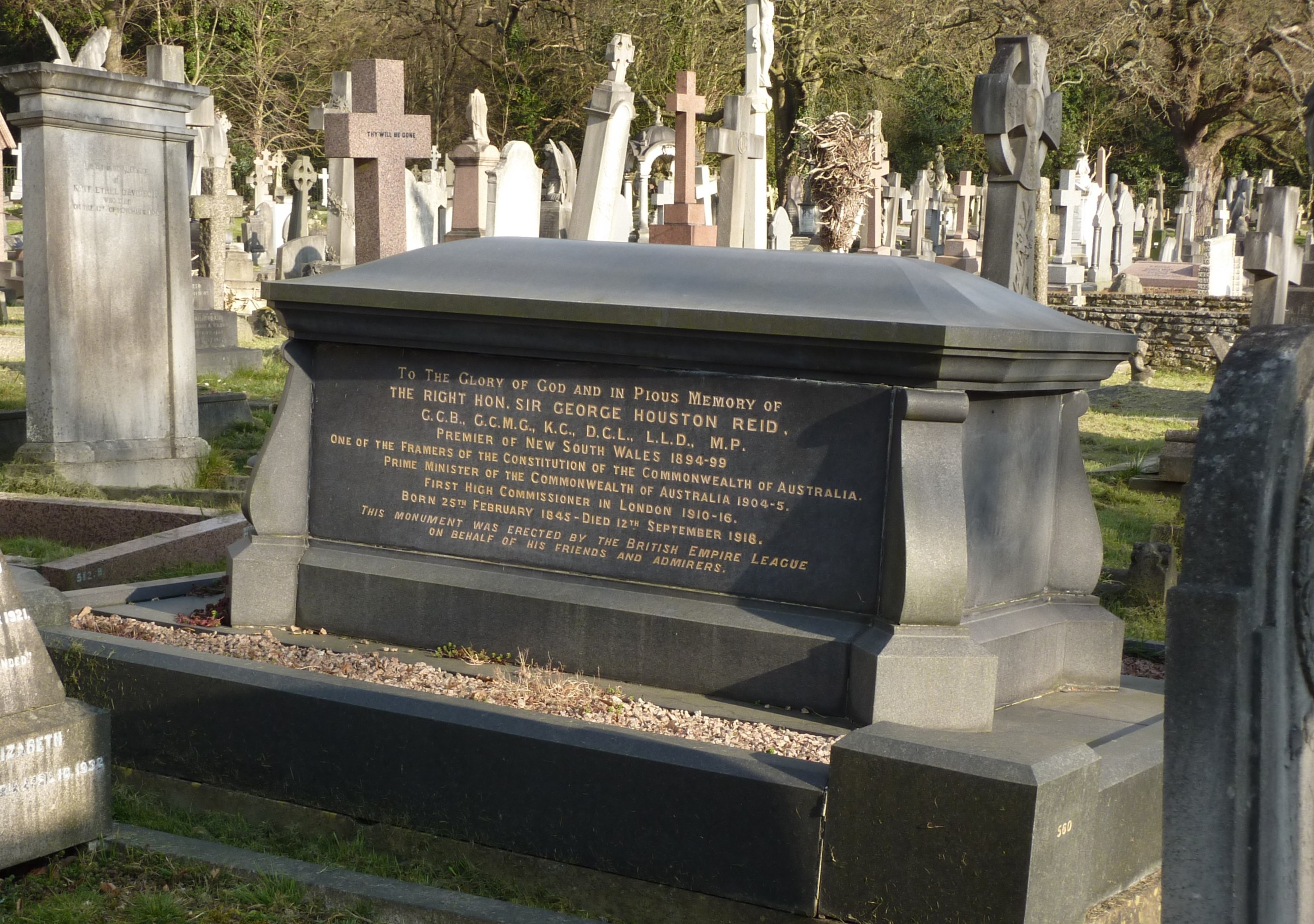
Reid's grave at Putney Vale Cemetery in London, in 2015

In 1910, Reid was appointed as Australia's first High Commissioner in London.

Reid was extremely popular in Britain, and in 1916, when his term as High Commissioner ended, he was elected unopposed to the House of Commons of the United Kingdom for the seat of St George, Hanover Square as a Unionist candidate, where he acted as a spokesman for the self-governing Dominions in supporting the war effort.

== Personal life ==
In 1891, aged 46, Reid married Flora Brumby, the daughter of a Tasmanian farmer. Their marriage was conducted in relative secrecy in Wangaratta, Victoria, and was not announced publicly for nine months. The couple had two sons and one daughter.

Reid died suddenly in London on 12 September 1918, aged 73, of cerebral thrombosis.

== Legacy ==
Reid's posthumous reputation suffered from the general acceptance of protectionist policies by other parties, as well as from his buffoonish public image. In 1989 W. G. McMinn published George Reid, a serious biography designed to rescue Reid from his reputation as a clownish reactionary and attempt to show his Free Trade policies as having been vindicated by history.

== Honours ==
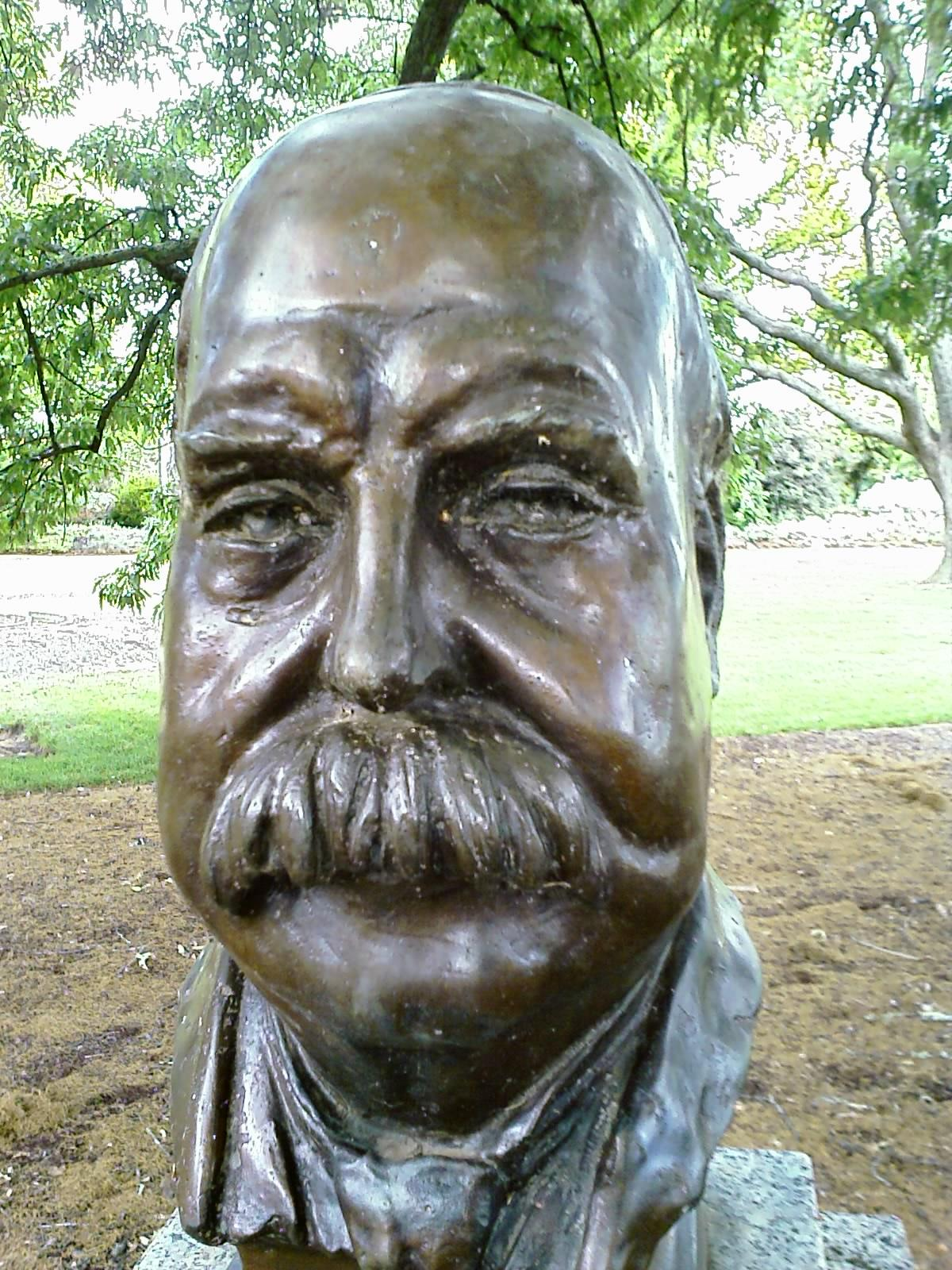
Bust of George Reid by sculptor Wallace Anderson located in the Prime Ministers Avenue in the Ballarat Botanical Gardens

In 1897 Reid was made an Honorary Doctor of Civil Law (DCL) by Oxford University. Reid was also appointed a member of His Majesty's Most Honourable Privy Council (1904), a Knight Grand Cross of the Order of St Michael and St George (1911) and a Knight Grand Cross of the Order of the Bath (1916).

One of the oldest suburbs within Canberra, the suburb of Reid, was named after George Reid.

The federal electoral Division of Reid, created in 1922, in Western Sydney bears his name.

In 1969 he was honoured on a postage stamp bearing his portrait issued by Australia Post.

== Works ==
- The Australian Commonwealth and her relation to the British Empire (address, 1912)
- If Germany should win! (1918)

== See also ==
- Reid Ministry

== Sources and further reading ==
- Crisp, L. F. (1979). George Houstoun Reid: Federation Father, Federal Failure?. ANU Press. ISBN 090959631X.
- Gorman, Zachary (2015). "George Reid's anti-socialist campaign in the evolution of Australian liberalism". In Melleuish, G. C. (ed.). Liberalism and Conservatism. Connor Court. pp. 17–38. ISBN 9781925138597.
- Headon, David (2020). George Houstoun Reid (1845–1918) Australia's Fourth Prime Minister: Forgotten Founder (PDF). Australian Parliamentary Library. ISBN 9780987576460.
- McMinn, W. G. (1989). George Reid. Carlton, Vic: Melbourne University Press. ISBN 0-522-84373-5.
- Prentis, Malcolm D (1993). "Scottish Seceder in the Australian Colonies: The Eccentric Pilgrimage of John Reid". The Journal of Religious History. 17 (3): 343. doi:10.1111/j.1467-9809.1993.tb00726.x.

New South Wales Legislative Assembly
Preceded by John Davies	Member for East Sydney; 1880–1884; Served alongside: Renwick, Barton, Dangar, McElhone, Copeland, Parkes, Griffiths	Succeeded by Sydney Burdekin
Preceded by George Griffiths	Member for East Sydney; 1885–1894; Served alongside: Burdekin, Barton, McMillan, Copeland, Bradley, Street, Parkes,	Succeeded by District abolished
New district	Member for Sydney-King; 1894–1901	Succeeded by Ernest Broughton
Political offices
Preceded by Francis Suttor	Minister of Public Instruction; 1883–1884	Succeeded by William Trickett
Preceded by George Dibbs	Premier of New South Wales; 1894–1899	Succeeded by William Lyne
Preceded by Jack Want	Attorney General of New South Wales; 1899	Succeeded by Bernhard Wise
Parliament of Australia
New division	Member for East Sydney; 1901–1910	Succeeded by John West
Political offices
New title	Leader of the Opposition of Australia; 1901–1904	Succeeded by Alfred Deakin
Preceded by Chris Watson	Prime Minister of Australia; 1904–1905	Succeeded by Alfred Deakin
Preceded by Chris Watson	Leader of the Opposition of Australia; 1905–1908	Succeeded by Joseph Cook
Party political offices
New political party	Leader of the Free Trade Party; 1901–1906	Renamed the Anti-Socialist Party
New political party	Leader of the Anti-Socialist Party; 1906–1908	Succeeded by Joseph Cook
Diplomatic posts
New title	Australian High Commissioner to the United Kingdom; 1910–1916	Succeeded by Andrew Fisher
Parliament of the United Kingdom
Preceded by Sir Alexander Henderson	Member for St George, Hanover Square; 1916–1918	Succeeded by Sir Newton Moore
