= 1913 St George's, Hanover Square by-election =

UK Parliamentary by-election

The St George's, Hanover Square by-election of 1913 was held on 15 July 1913. The by-election was held due to the death of the incumbent Conservative MP, Alfred Lyttelton. It was won by the Conservative candidate Sir Alexander Henderson, who was elected unopposed.

1913 by-election: St George's, Hanover Square
Party	Candidate	Votes	%	±%
Unionist	Alexander Henderson	Unopposed		
Unionist hold				
