= Alexander Henderson, 1st Baron Faringdon =

British politician

The Right Honourable The Lord Faringdon CH

Member of Parliament for West Staffordshire
- In office 1898–1906
- Preceded by: Hamar Alfred Bass
- Succeeded by: Henry McLaren

Member of Parliament for Westminster St George's
- In office 1913–1916
- Preceded by: Alfred Lyttelton
- Succeeded by: George Reid

Personal details
- Born: 28 September 1850
- Died: 17 March 1934 (aged 83)
- Spouse: Jane Ellen Davis
- Children: 7

Alexander Henderson, 1st Baron Faringdon CH (28 September 1850 – 17 March 1934), known as Sir Alexander Henderson, 1st Baronet, from 1902 to 1916, was a British financier and Liberal Unionist Member of Parliament.

== Biography ==
Henderson was the son of George Henderson of Langholm, Dumfriesshire. He began his career in the City of London with the accountancy firm Deloitte before becoming a stockbroker. He was best known as a financier of railways in Great Britain and overseas (such as the Algeciras Gibraltar Railway Company), and was chairman of the Great Central Railway (GCR) from 5 May 1899 until the end of 1922, and then deputy chairman of its successor, the London and North Eastern Railway (LNER), from 1923 until his death. He was also a major shareholder in the Manchester Ship Canal and was involved in port developments and telephone and electrical systems in several countries. The Witan Investment Trust was created in 1909 to hold his properties, and the asset management firm Henderson Administration was founded in 1934 after his death to administer his estate. Henderson Administration was rebranded to Henderson Global Investors 70 odd years later.

In 1898 Henderson was elected to the House of Commons representing West Staffordshire, a seat he held until 1906, and he later returned to parliament as member for St George's Hanover Square from 1913 to 1916.

The 1902 Coronation Honours list published on 26 June 1902 for the subsequently postponed coronation of King Edward VII, announced that Henderson was to receive a baronetcy, and on 24 July 1902 he was created a Baronet, of Buscot Park, in the county of Berkshire. In 1912 he was appointed High Sheriff of Berkshire. In 1916 he was raised to the peerage as Baron Faringdon of Buscot Park in the county of Berkshire (now in Oxfordshire), and on 4 June 1917 was made a Member of the Order of the Companions of Honour for "services in connection with the war", in his capacity as Vice-Chairman of the Shipping Control Committee.

He was on the governing body of Abingdon School from 1915 to 1934 and was the Chairman of the Governors from 1927 until his death in 1934.

== Family ==
Henderson married Jane Ellen, daughter of Edward William Davis, in 1874. He died in March 1934, aged 83, and was succeeded by his grandson Gavin, his eldest son Lieutenant-Colonel the Hon. Harold Henderson having predeceased him.

Altogether, the Hendersons had seven children:

- Harold (born 29 October 1875)
- Alec (born 23 October 1876)
- Frank (born 11 October 1877)
- Margaret (born 6 April 1879), grandmother of Mark Schreiber, Baron Marlesford
- Philip (born 16 March 1881)
- Arnold (born 1 July 1883)
- Eric (born 26 September 1884). Eric changed his surname to Butler-Henderson shortly after his marriage in 1910, and it was as the Hon. Eric B. Butler-Henderson that he was elected to the Board of the GCR in 1918; like his father, he also served on the Board of the LNER from its formation at the start of 1923.

== Honours ==
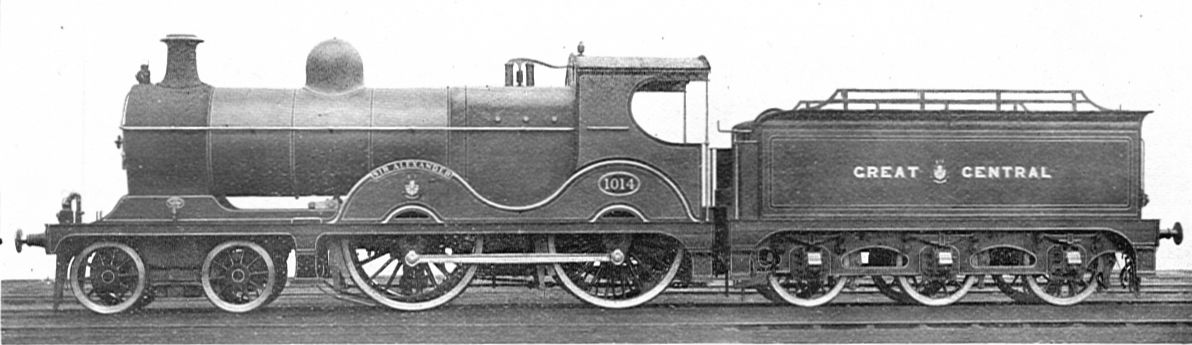
GCR no. 1014 Sir Alexander, one of several locomotives named after Henderson

Both Henderson and his wife were honoured by having railway locomotives named after them, all being express passenger types. In 1902, the Great Central Railway (GCR), the railway of which Henderson was chairman, gave the name Sir Alexander to one of their 4-4-0 locomotives, no. 1014 of class 11B (LNER class D9), which had been built the previous year; Henderson having recently been created a baronet. His wife was similarly honoured when one of the GCR's class 8E 4-4-2 (LNER class C5), no. 364 (built 1906), was named Lady Henderson by March 1907. In August 1913, the GCR named their new Class 11E (LNER Class D10) 4-4-0 locomotives after directors of that railway; they became known as the "Director" class as a result. The first of the class, no. 429, was named Sir Alexander Henderson, and the name Sir Alexander was removed from no. 1014 at the same time. In 1917, after Henderson was raised to the peerage, no. 364 was renamed Lady Faringdon, and carried the name until withdrawal in December 1947; but instead of no. 429 being renamed, the name was removed from this locomotive, and instead, newly built class 9P 4-6-0 (LNER class B3) no. 1169 was named Lord Faringdon, and carried the name until withdrawal in December 1947. In March 1948, British Railways renamed an ex-LNER class A4 4-6-2, no. 60034 (hitherto named Peregrine) Lord Faringdon; again the name was carried until withdrawal, this occurring in 1966.

Henderson's youngest son Eric was similarly honoured in 1919 when class 11F 4-4-0 no. 506 was named Butler-Henderson; Eric was one of only two GCR Directors of the time who had not already given their names to locomotives. This locomotive ran until 1960, and has been preserved. In addition to these, the Hendersons' Scottish retreat provided the name for another GCR locomotive – no. 4 Glenalmond of class 1A; built in 1913, it ran until 1947.

== Arms ==
Coat of arms of Alexander Henderson, 1st Baron Faringdon
Crest A hand holding a torteau charged with a mullet of six point Argent. Escutcheon Or three piles issuant from the sinister Vert on a chief Ermine three torteaux. Supporters Dexter a chevalier armed at all points holding in the dexter hand a lance with his lordship's pennon bearing the motto "Sursum Corda" all Proper sinister a centaur drawing his bow Proper. Motto Sola Virtus Nobilitat

== Notes ==
Parliament of the United Kingdom
Preceded by Hamar Bass	Member of Parliament for West Staffordshire; 1898–1906	Succeeded by Henry McLaren
Preceded by Alfred Lyttelton	Member of Parliament for St George's, Hanover Square; 1913–1916	Succeeded by George Reid
Peerage of the United Kingdom
New creation	Baron Faringdon; 1916–1934	Succeeded by Gavin Henderson
Baronetage of the United Kingdom
New creation	Baronet (of Buscot Park); 1902–1934	Succeeded by Gavin Henderson
