= Laming Worthington-Evans =

British politician (1868–1931)

The Right Honourable Sir Laming Worthington-Evans Bt GBE
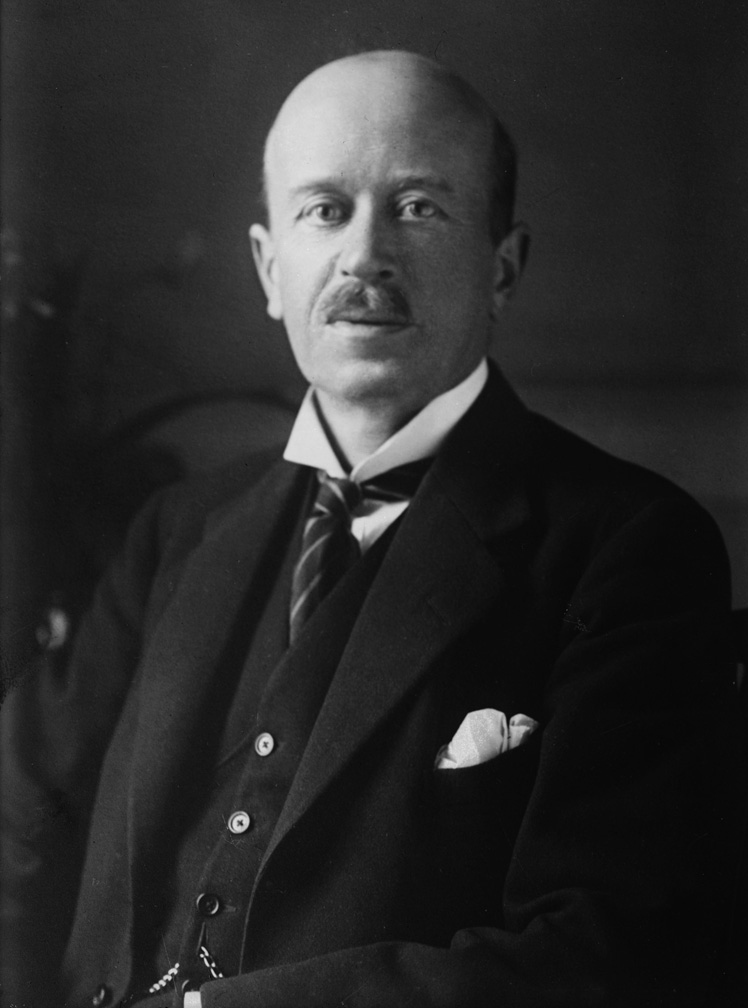

Secretary of State for War
- In office 13 February 1921 – 19 October 1922
- Prime Minister: David Lloyd George
- Preceded by: Winston Churchill
- Succeeded by: The Earl of Derby
- In office 6 November 1924 – 4 June 1929
- Prime Minister: Stanley Baldwin
- Preceded by: Stephen Walsh
- Succeeded by: Tom Shaw

Personal details
- Born: 23 August 1868 Colchester
- Died: 14 February 1931 (aged 62)
- Party: Conservative
- Spouse: Gertrude Hale
- Education: None

Sir Worthington Laming Worthington-Evans, 1st Baronet (23 August 1868 – 14 February 1931) was a British Conservative politician.

== Background and education ==
Born Laming Evans, he was the son of Worthington Evans and Susanah Laming. He assumed the prefix surname of Worthington by Royal Licence in 1916, although he had been calling himself Worthington Evans (without a hyphen) for many years. He trained as a solicitor.

== Military career ==
Worthington-Evans was commissioned into the part-time 2nd Middlesex Artillery Volunteers in 1891 and was promoted lieutenant in 1893 and captain in 1897. He served as temporary major in the First World War.

== Political career ==
Worthington-Evans unsuccessfully contested the Colchester constituency in 1906. He won the seat in January 1910.

Worthington-Evans was made a Baronet, of Colchester in the County of Essex, in 1916. He served in David Lloyd George's coalition government as Parliamentary Secretary to the Ministry of Munitions from 1916 to 1918, and as Minister of Blockade (not a member of the small wartime War Cabinet) in 1918.

In 1919 he was sworn of the Privy Council, and served in Lloyd George's Cabinet as Minister of Pensions from 1919 to 1920, as Minister without Portfolio from 1920 to 1921 and as Secretary of State for War from 1921 to 1922. Whilst Worthington-Evans was Secretary of State for War he famously said "If the Arab population realised that the peaceful control of Mesopotamia (Iraq) ultimately depends on our intention of bombing women and children, I'm very doubtful if we shall gain that acquiescence of the fathers and husbands of Mesopotamia to which the Secretary of State for the Colonies (Winston Churchill) looks forward." He was a member of the British delegation that negotiated the Anglo-Irish Treaty. He was one of the British delegates to the International Economic Conference at Genoa in 1922. He was appointed a GBE in 1922.

As with many Cabinet Ministers in the Lloyd George Coalition, Worthington-Evans declined office in Bonar Law's new government when Lloyd George fell in October 1922. Alone amongst the "Coalition Conservatives" he accepted an invitation the following May when Law retired and was succeeded by Stanley Baldwin. He served under Baldwin as Postmaster General between May 1923 and January 1924. He also served on various Cabinet Committees, including those relating to Northern Ireland and Unemployment. He became chairman of the latter in August 1923.

Worthington-Evans also served in Baldwin's second government (1924–29) as Secretary of State for War. He was a member of several Conservative and Unionist Party committees including the Policy committee which he chaired in 1927.

At the 1929 United Kingdom general election he transferred to the London seat of Westminster St George's. His death caused the 1931 Westminster St George's by-election at which the seat was won by Duff Cooper, a result seen as an endorsement of the continued leadership of Stanley Baldwin.

== Family ==
He married Gertrude Hale in 1898 and had one son and one daughter. He died in February 1931, aged 62, and was succeeded in the baronetcy by his son, William. The papers of Worthington-Evans (from 1895 to 1931) are held at the Bodleian Library, University of Oxford.

== Sources ==
- Who Was Who
- Dictionary of National Biography
- Murray, Paul The Irish Boundary Commission And Its Origins

Parliament of the United Kingdom
Preceded by Weetman Pearson	Member of Parliament for Colchester; January 1910–1929	Succeeded by Oswald Lewis
Preceded by James Erskine	Member of Parliament for Westminster St George's; 1929–1931	Succeeded by Duff Cooper
Political offices
New office	Parliamentary Secretary to the Ministry of Munitions; 1916–1918	Succeeded by F. G. Kellaway
Preceded by Lord Robert Cecil	Minister of Blockade; 1918	Office abolished
Preceded by John Hodge	Minister of Pensions; 1919–1920	Succeeded by Ian Macpherson
Preceded by Winston Churchill	Secretary of State for War; 1921–1922	Succeeded by The Earl of Derby
Preceded by Sir William Joynson-Hicks, Bt	Postmaster-General; 1923–1924	Succeeded by Vernon Hartshorn
Preceded by Stephen Walsh	Secretary of State for War; 1924–1929	Succeeded by Tom Shaw
Media offices
Preceded by W. A. Doman and William Lang	Editor of the Financial News; 1924–1925	Succeeded by Hilton Young
Baronetage of the United Kingdom
New creation	Baronet (of Colchester); 1916–1931	Succeeded by William Worthington-Evans
