= Anti-Waste League =

Former political party in the UK

The Anti-Waste League was a political party in the United Kingdom, founded in 1921 by the newspaper proprietor Lord Rothermere.

== Formation ==
The formation of the League was announced in a January 1921 edition of the Sunday Pictorial with Rothermere attacking what he saw as government waste during the Depression of 1920–1921. As such the party advocated reduced spending in government, at both local and national level. It was particularly critical of the retention of the high levels of income tax after the end of the war as well as the funding provided for the 'homes fit for heroes' scheme.

== Electoral performance ==
The party stood in a number of by-elections, taking an increasingly anti-communist line. James Malcolm Monteith Erskine was elected as a joint nominee with an unofficial Conservative Association in the 1921 Westminster St George's by-election, and Murray Sueter was elected in a joint candidacy with the Independent Parliamentary Group in the 1921 Hertford by-election. Rothermere's son Esmond Harmsworth became the leader of the party's Westminster grouping, which co-operated closely with the Independent Parliamentary Group of Horatio Bottomley. Max Aitken, Lord Beaverbrook was also a leading patron of the group.

A further crisis came with a by-election in the Abbey division of Westminster in August 1921. All three candidates claimed to be representing Anti-Waste and to be unconnected with the Coalition. Brigadier-General Nicholson, theoretically the official Unionist nominee, described himself as 'Constitutional and Independent Conservative Anti-Waste', as opposed to Lieutenant R.V.K. Applin, the Anti-Waste's official candidate, and Sir Arnold Lupton, a former Liberal MP for Sleaford who stood as 'Independent Liberal and Anti-Waste'. Nicholson's victory by just over 1,000 on a low poll was indeed a glorious triumph for the government. It was followed by another desperate contest in London, in West Lewisham where Sir Philip Dawson, Conservative and Anti-Waste, defeated Lieutenant-Commander Windham, the Anti-Waste candidate, by just 747 votes.

— Kenneth O. Morgan, Consensus and Disunity: The Lloyd George Coalition Government 1918-1922

== Dissolution ==
In reaction to the growth of the League, the Conservatives launched a Committee for National Expenditure, led by Eric Geddes, with the aim of cutting spending, and eventually acted on many of its recommendations. As their support dipped in the face of the Conservatives co-opting their ideas the League changed its focus to sponsoring independent candidates and even those from other parties who shared their aims. Following the 1922 general election the League disbanded with most of its members returning to the Conservative Party.
