= Lord Algernon Percy =

British politician (1851–1933)

- High Sheriff of Warwickshire
- Predecessor: Frederick James Shaw
- Successor: William Francis Stratford Dugdale
- Born: Algernon Malcolm Arthur Percy; 2 October 1851; Albury Park, Surrey
- Died: 28 December 1933 (aged 82)
- Noble family: House of Percy
- Spouse: Lady Victoria Frederica Caroline Edgcumbe
- Issue: Algernon William; Katharine Louisa Victoria
- Father: Algernon Percy, 6th Duke of Northumberland
- Mother: Louisa Drummond
- Occupation: Politician, Soldier

Algernon Percy, 1st Earl of Beverley was also known as Lord Algernon Percy from 1766-86.

Colonel Lord Algernon Malcolm Arthur Percy (2 October 1851 – 28 December 1933) was a British career soldier and Conservative politician who sat in the House of Commons from 1882 to 1887.

Percy was born at Albury Park, Surrey, the second son of the 6th Duke of Northumberland and his wife Louisa Drummond, daughter of Henry Drummond of Albury Park. He was educated at Eton and Christ Church, Oxford. From 1872 to 1880, he was a lieutenant in the Grenadier Guards. He was Major in the part-time 3rd (Royal Berkshire Militia) Battalion, Royal Berkshire Regiment from 1881 to 1886. He was also J.P. for Surrey.

In 1882, Percy was elected Member of Parliament for Westminster and held the seat until it was divided under the Redistribution of Seats Act 1885. In the 1885 general election, he was elected MP for St George's, Hanover Square, until he resigned his seat in 1887.

Percy transferred as a major from the 3rd Berkshires to the 3rd (Militia) Battalion of the Northumberland Fusiliers on 24 June 1886, and was promoted to lieutenant-colonel on 15 July 1895. In early 1900 he joined the regiment when it was stationed at Malta. He was appointed in command of the Tyne Volunteer Infantry Brigade on 5 March 1902, with the rank of colonel in the Volunteer Force whilst so serving. In the 1902 Coronation Honours list he was on 26 June 1902 appointed an aide-de-camp to King Edward VII, with the regular rank of colonel. He served as such until the King's death in 1910, and was re-appointed ADC to King George V from 1910 to 1920.

He was High Sheriff of Warwickshire in 1910, sometime County Alderman of Warwickshire and Chairman of Warwickshire County Council.

Percy married Lady Victoria Edgcumbe (a daughter of the 4th Earl of Mount Edgcumbe) on 3 August 1880 and they had two children:

- Algernon William (1884–1916), killed (unmarried) aboard HMS Queen Mary at the Battle of Jutland.
- Katharine Louisa Victoria (1882–1964), married her cousin, Josceline Heber-Percy, and had issue.

Percy and his wife had made their home at Guy's Cliffe, near Warwick.

Parliament of the United Kingdom
Preceded by William Henry Smith and Sir Charles Russell, Bt.	Member of Parliament for Westminster; 1882–1885; With: Sir Charles Russell, Bt.	Succeeded by William Burdett-Coutts (representation reduced to one member)
New constituency	Member of Parliament for St George's, Hanover Square; 1885–1887	Succeeded by George Goschen
Honorary titles
Preceded by Frederick James Shaw	High Sheriff of Warwickshire; 1910–1911	Succeeded by William Francis Stratford Dugdale
