= Manmath Chandra Mallik =

Manmath Chandra Mallik (1853–1922) or Manmatha Chandra Mallik, was a British Indian barrister, writer and Liberal Party candidate.

== Life ==
Manmath Mallik was born in Calcutta, India, into a branch of the Basu Mallik family. He was the second son of Jaygopal Basu Mallik, and Krishabhabini Dasi Dutta.

Having left India in 1871 for Christ's College, Cambridge, Manmath was called to the bar in 1875.

Mallik was defeated as the main challenger and the Liberal candidate for St George's Hanover Square in 1906; then for the Uxbridge county-division seat in the second election of 1910.

His social clubs were in four cities: National Liberal in London; Scottish Liberal, Edinburgh; Calcutta, Calcutta; Tokyo, Tokyo. He was a Fellow of the Zoological Society of London.

He died on 13 June 1922 at the Regent Palace Hotel, London, with executor named as his son Jay Paul, leaving effects of £250.

Despite the family home being 12 Wellington Square, his main address is given as 241 Lower Circular Road, Calcutta; his probate also gives Nikko, Japan and Middle Temple.

== Family ==
Mallik had five children with his wife. With the exception of Jay Paul Harabhajan, and Lucia Harabandini, they all died young.

- Jay Paul married Barbara Nowell and had one daughter, Anne-Marie Mallik.
- Lucia married Dr. Chidamber N. Chitnis and had four children: Jay-Gopal, Indira, Pratap, and Anand.

== Publications ==
- Problem of Existence, 1904
- Impressions of a Wanderer, 1907
- A Study in Ideals; Great Britain and India, 1912
- Orient and Occident: A Comparative Study, 1914
