= Ernest Petter =

English industrialist

Ernest Willoughby Petter
- Born: 26 May 1873; Yeovil, Somerset
- Died: 18 July 1954 (aged 81); New Milton, Hampshire
- Education: Mount Radford School
- Occupation: Industrialist
- Children: Teddy Petter, Gordon Petter
- Relatives: Andrew Petter (grandson)

Sir Ernest Willoughby Petter (26 May 1873 – 18 July 1954) was an English industrialist and unsuccessful politician.

== Biography ==
Ernest and Percival Waddams Petter (1873–1955) were identical twins born on 26 May 1873 in High Street, Yeovil, Somerset. They were the third and fourth of the fifteen children born to James Bazeley Petter, an ironmonger and iron founder, of Yeovil, and his wife, Charlotte Waddams. The twins initially attended school in Sherborne, then went to Yeovil Grammar School before being sent off to Mount Radford School, Exeter, at age 14. They left school in 1890 and began apprenticing with their father.

Ernest, along with his twin Percy, had built the Petter Horseless Carriage by 1895, the first British car with an internal combustion engine. The car, using a converted four-wheel horse-drawn phaeton and a 3 hp (2 kW) horizontal oil engine, had a top speed of 12 miles per hour (19 km/h). The vehicle weighed 9 cwt (457 kg) including the 120 lb (55 kg) of the Petter engine with its flywheel and side bars.

The brothers co-founded the Yeovil Motor Car Co. Ltd. in 1895 with their father, making two-person motor carriages. However, the venture was not commercially viable, and the company transitioned to making engines for industrial and agricultural customers. Ernest and Percy then proceeded to purchase the company from their father in 1901, and restructured it into James B Petter & Sons, both serving as managing directors. Westland Aircraft Works was set up in 1915 as a division of Petters to build military aircraft; in the same year the Petters constructed the Short Type 184, the first British seaplane to take part in a naval battle. Westland would be spun off from Petters in 1935.

Ernest Petter served as president of the British Engineers Association from 1923 to 1925, and was knighted in 1925 for his role as a commissioner of the British Empire Exhibition. After visiting relatives in Comox Valley on the east coast of Vancouver Island, British Columbia, Canada, he decided to build a large manor house (named "The Fort") in the town of Comox, which was completed in 1938. He then lived for a while in Saanich (just outside the provincial capital of Victoria) before moving back to the UK in 1954. He died at New Milton, Hampshire later that year at the age of 81.

His son William Edward Willoughby 'Teddy' Petter was an aircraft designer. His grandson Andrew Petter represented the electoral district of Saanich South in the Legislative Assembly of British Columbia from 1991 to 2001 and served in several cabinet posts during that time, including as Attorney General of British Columbia.

== Political career ==
Petter twice fought Bristol North: in 1918 as a National Party candidate and in 1923 as a Conservative, both times coming third.

As part of his political candidacy, Petter published an essay titled 'The Disease Of Unemployment And The Cure'.

He fought the 1931 Westminster St George's by-election as an Independent Conservative opposed to Stanley Baldwin's leadership of the Conservative Party. Though he claimed to be free of party and running at the request of the electors, he was strongly backed by the Beaverbrook and Rothermere papers, including the Daily Express and Daily Mail. He was defeated by the official Conservative, Duff Cooper.
