= James Erskine (Conservative politician) =

British Conservative politician (1863–1944)

Sir James Erskine
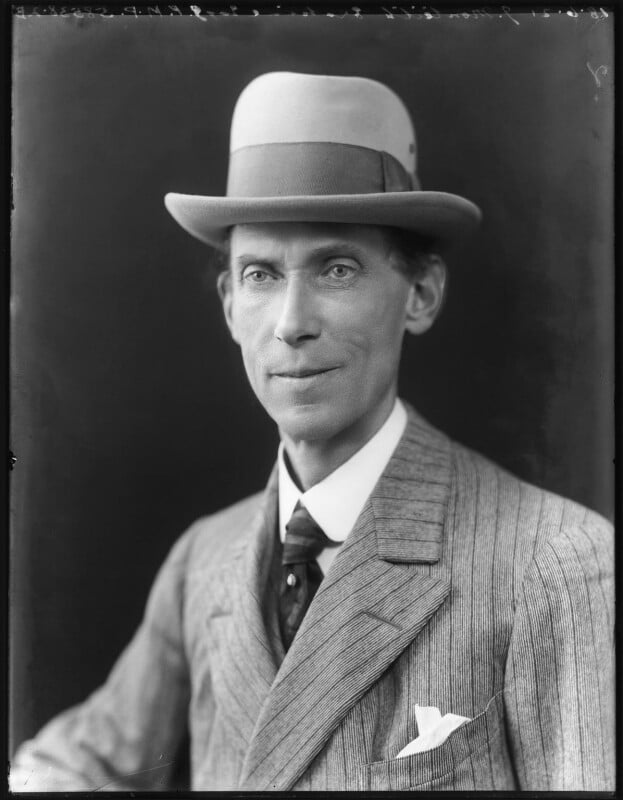
- Erskine in 1921

Member of Parliament for Westminster St George's
- In office 1921–1929
- Prime Minister: David Lloyd George, Bonar Law, Ramsay MacDonald, Stanley Baldwin
- Preceded by: Sir Walter Long, later Viscount Long
- Succeeded by: Sir Laming Worthington-Evans, 1st Baronet

Personal details
- Born: 18 July 1863
- Died: 5 November 1944 (aged 81)
- Party: Anti-Waste League Independent Conservative, later Conservative
- Spouse: Cicely Quicke
- Education: Wellington College

Sir James Malcolm Monteith Erskine (18 July 1863 – 5 November 1944), sometimes referred to as J. M. M. Erskine, was a British politician. First elected at a Westminster St George's by-election in 1921 as an Anti-Waste League candidate, then returned a second time as an Independent Conservative, Erskine went on to be returned twice more as an unopposed official Conservative.

== Life ==
Erskine was one of the nine children of Captain David Holland Erskine, British Consul in Madeira, by his marriage on 23 December 1856 to Augusta Jane Stoddart. His father was the second son of Sir David Erskine, 1st Baronet, of Cambo, Fife, and Erskine later became heir-presumptive to the baronetcy of his cousin Sir Thomas Erskine, 5th Baronet. He was educated at Wellington College and abroad. In 1898, he married Cicely Grace, a daughter of the Rev. Charles Penrose Quicke, Rector of Ashbrittle, Somerset, and they had four sons and one daughter.

A member of a Rural District Council in Sussex, Erskine became Chairman of the Committee of the Clan Erskine Society and also a Justice of the Peace for Sussex. At a Westminster St George's constituency by-election in 1921, Erskine scored a notable victory standing as an "Independent Anti-Waste" candidate supported by an unofficial grouping of Conservatives, in a straight fight against the official "Coalition Unionist" candidate, Sir Herbert Jessel. He was, at the time, living in the division at 7, Eccleston Square, and was avowedly a Conservative. His majority was 1,888, with a 57 per cent share of the votes, whereas at the 1918 general election the previous member for Westminster St George's, the Conservative and Unionist Sir Walter Long, had gained more than 90 per cent of the votes. The Times newspaper gave much of the credit for the result to the support Erskine had received from its popular rival the Daily Mirror.

Using the campaign slogan "Economy without exception", Erskine attacked "the orgy of extravagance which has marked the last few years", extravagance not only by the government but also by the London County Council, while his opponent, Jessel, attempted to portray himself as the true anti-waste candidate. Speaking after the declaration of the result, Erskine said:

I won because the whole country demands economy. That is the message from the St George's division of Westminster, not only to the House of Commons, but also to the country. Why Sir Herbert Jessel lost, I don't know.

At the 1922 election Erskine held his Westminster seat as an Independent Conservative with an increased majority, this time with both Conservative and Liberal candidates standing against him. In 1923 and 1924 he became the official representative of the Conservatives and was elected unopposed. In London, Erskine was a member of the Junior Carlton Club and later of the Carlton Club.

Erskine retired from parliament in 1929 and was knighted the same year, in the Dissolution Honours of Stanley Baldwin gazetted on 28 June 1929. He died on 5 November 1944, and at the time of his death was living at 82-83 Eccleston Square, Westminster.

Erskine's son, Sir Derek Quicke Erskine (1905–1977), settled in Kenya, where he became a Member of Parliament and Chief Whip of the Kenya African National Union parliamentary party.

== Notes ==
Parliament of the United Kingdom
Preceded by Sir Walter Long	Member of Parliament for Westminster St George's; 1921–1929	Succeeded by Sir Laming Worthington-Evans
