= 1918 St George's, Hanover Square by-election =

UK Parliamentary by-election

The St George's, Hanover Square by-election of 1918 was held on 4 October 1918. The by-election was held due to the death of the incumbent Conservative MP, Sir George Reid. It was won by the Conservative candidate Sir Newton Moore, who was elected unopposed.

1918 by-election: St George's, Hanover Square
Party	Candidate	Votes	%	±%
Unionist	Newton Moore	Unopposed		
Unionist hold				
