= Portrayals of Alice in Wonderland =

Alice
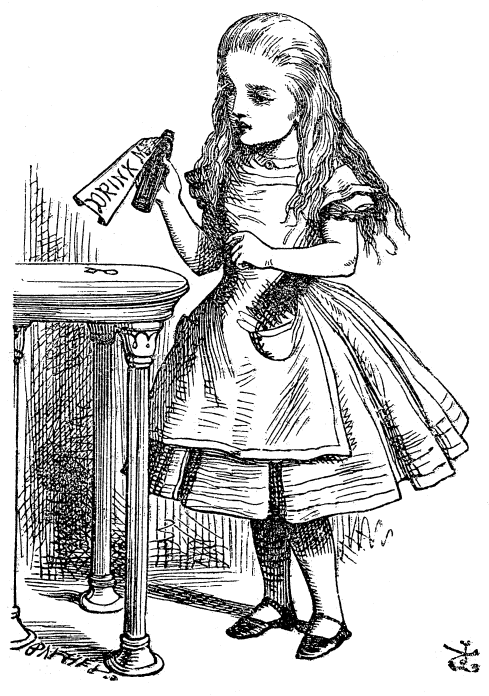
- Alice in one of John Tenniel's illustrations for Alice's Adventures in Wonderland
- First appearance: Alice's Adventures in Wonderland (1865)
- Last appearance: Through the Looking-Glass (1871)
- Created by: Lewis Carroll
- Portrayed by: May Clark (Alice in Wonderland); Gladys Hulette (Alice's Adventures in Wonderland); Viola Savoy (Alice in Wonderland); Ruth Gilbert (Alice in Wonderland); Charlotte Henry (Alice in Wonderland); Vivian Pickles (Alice in Wonderland); Carol Marsh (Alice au pays des merveilles); Kathryn Beaumont (One Hour in Wonderland); Anne-Marie Mallik (Alice in Wonderland); Fiona Fullerton (Alice's Adventures in Wonderland); Kristine DeBell (Alice in Wonderland); Sophie Barjac (Alicja/Alice); Kate Burton (Alice in Wonderland); Natalie Gregory (Alice in Wonderland); Kate Dorning (Alice in Wonderland); Kristýna Kohoutová (Něco z Alenky/Something from Alice); Elisabeth Harnois (Adventures in Wonderland); Tina Majorino (Alice in Wonderland); Mia Wasikowska (Alice in Wonderland, Alice Through the Looking Glass); Sophie Lowe (Once Upon a Time in Wonderland); Rose Reynolds (Once Upon a Time); Keira Chansa (Come Away); Anna Peresild (Alice in Wonderland)
- Voiced by: Kathryn Beaumont (1951–2005; 2023); Norma MacMillan (Alice of Wonderland in Paris, 1966); Marina Neyolova (Alice in Wonderland, Soviet 1981 animated film); Tarako Isono (Fushigi no Kuni no Alice, 1983–1984); Janet Waldo (Alice Through the Looking Glass, 1987); Olivia Martin (Alice in Wonderland, 1988 Burbank Animation Australia); Hynden Walch (2005–present)

Alice, the main protagonist of Lewis Carroll's novels Alice's Adventures in Wonderland (1865) and Through the Looking-Glass (1871), has been adapted into several forms of media, including novels, films, television, stage productions, and video games.

== Stage ==
The first professional stage adaptation of Alice's Adventures in Wonderland and Through the Looking Glass, the musical Alice in Wonderland, a Dream Play for Children, in two acts, debuted on 23 December 1886 at the Prince of Wales Theatre in London, England, and continued until 18 March 1887, to good reviews; it starred Phoebe Carlo as Alice. The musical was later revived and performed at the Globe Theatre from 26 December 1888 to 9 February 1889, with Carroll's friend, Isa Bowman, as Alice. The musical was frequently revived during the "Christmas season," being produced eighteen times from 1898 to 1930. Alice's Adventures in Wonderland has since been adapted for various forms of the stage, including "ballets, operas, experimental theatre, Broadway musicals, puppet plays, mime acts, and rock musicals."

== Film ==
Directed and produced by Cecil Hepworth, the first film adaptation of Alice's Adventures in Wonderland debuted in Great Britain in 1903 as a silent film and in January 1904 in the United States. Because of its nature as a silent film, "it circulated freely throughout Europe and America." It starred May Clark as Alice and Hepworth's wife as the Queen of Hearts. The British Film Institute has restored fourteen of the original sixteen scenes. Two more silent film adaptations of Alice's Adventures in Wonderland were produced: one in 1910 starring Gladys Hulette, and another in 1915 with Viola Savoy as Alice. Ruth Gilbert starred as Alice in the first Alice film with sound (1931), followed by Charlotte Henry (1933), Carol Marsh (1948), Anne-Marie Malik (1966) and Fiona Fullerton (1972). The 2010 film Alice in Wonderland was produced by Joe Roth who wanted to recreate a modern Alice in Wonderland. It was directed by Tim Burton. This version was based on Through the Looking Glass and has Alice returning to Wonderland at the age of 19.

== Disney ==
=== Alice Comedies ===
Alice's Adventures in Wonderland had served as inspiration for Walt Disney's earlier Alice Comedies. By 1931, he had "storyboards and sketches" for a film adaptation of the children's novel; however, the release of another Alice film during the same year caused him to put the project on hold. With the conclusion of World War II, Disney considered the film again, planning it to be a combination of live-action and animation starring Ginger Rogers as Alice. In 1946, however, Disney decided to drop the live-action aspect of his Alice film and make it completely animated instead. For the voice of Alice, he wanted one "that would be English enough to satisfy British audiences and preserve the feeling of an English literary classic, but not so English that it would put off American audiences." He found that in young actress Kathryn Beaumont, when watching her in On an Island with You. Successfully auditioning for the role of Alice, Beaumont voiced the character and acted as reference material for the animators: her acting was recorded and used by them to animate the character. During the recording of her voice acting, Beaumont dressed as Alice to better aid her with "getting into character". Despite not being trained as a singer, she also provided Alice's singing voice, as Disney envisioned the songs as possessing a "childlike feel" to them.

=== Animated film ===
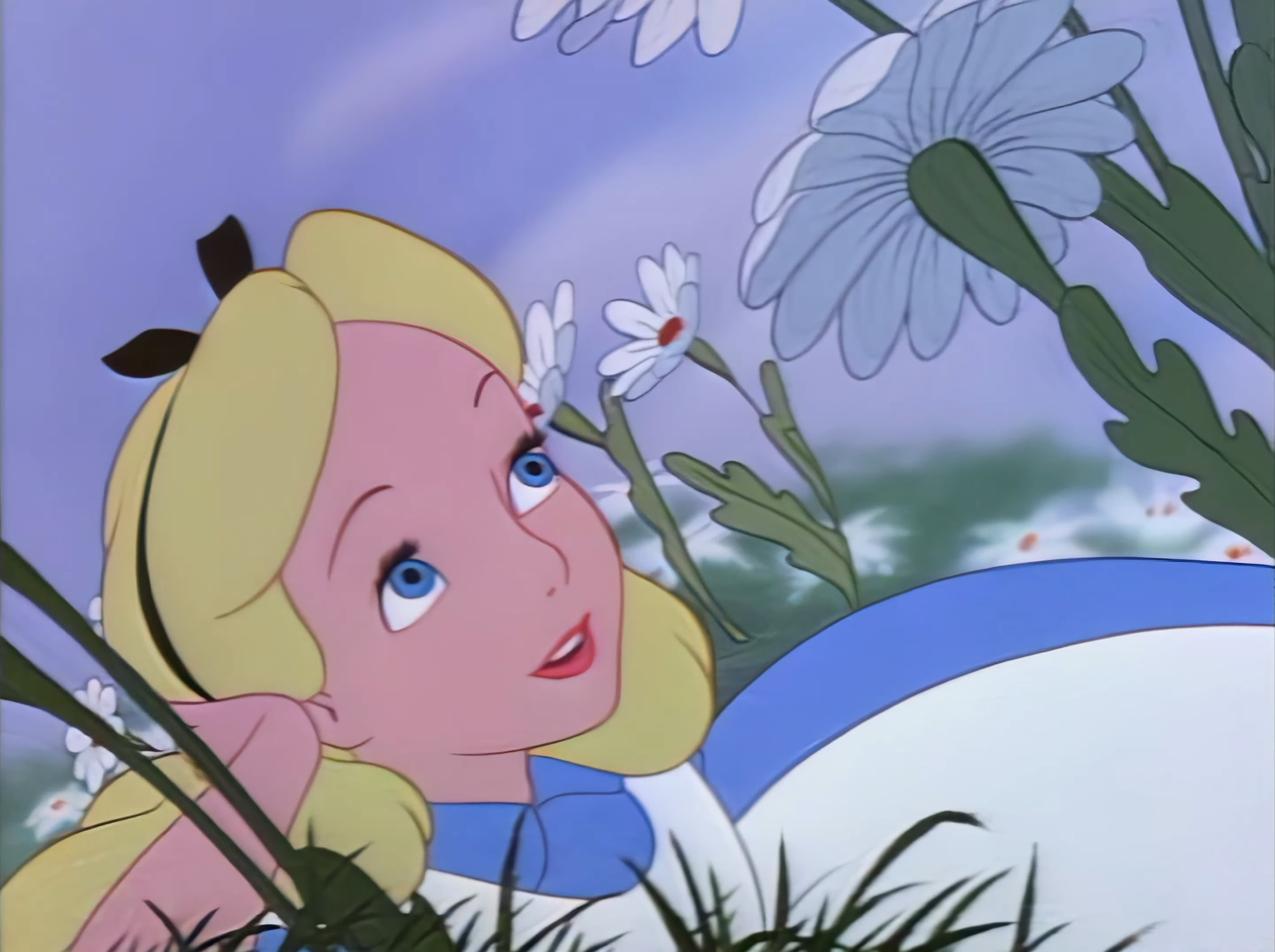
Alice in Alice in Wonderland (1951).

Alice is the main character of Alice in Wonderland. Alice is portrayed as being very curious, often seen daydreaming and giving herself advice instead of listening to the advice of others. The closest thing Alice has to a friend is Dinah, her kitten, and not even she understands Alice's dreams of finding "a world of her own." Alice is well mannered, polite, courteous, mature, and has the elegance and gentleness of a young woman; however, once she falls into Wonderland, she finds it harder to maintain her composure. She is shown to be determined, but her determination is often overpowered by her temper, as she does not give up on finding the White Rabbit until she gets frustrated, and is easily put off by rudeness. She wears a blue puffy short-sleeved knee-length wide-skirted dress, a white pinafore apron over-top, and a black ribbon tied into a bow in her thick blonde shoulder-length hair on top of her head. Underneath her dress, she wears frilly white ruffled knee-length bloomers over matching thigh-high stockings, a matching petticoat, and black strapped Mary Jane shoes. She is voiced by Kathryn Beaumont, who later also voiced Wendy Darling in Peter Pan (1953).

==== In video games ====
Alice appears in Disney's Villains' Revenge, where Queen of Hearts takes revenge on Alice by cutting off her head. The player encounters Alice's headless body walking through Queen of Hearts' maze and must help her find her head.

Alice is featured as a character in the video game series Kingdom Hearts. She is one of the Princesses of Heart encountered in the game along with Kairi, and her world, Wonderland, is one of the first Disney-based worlds visited. Alice also appears in the sequel, Kingdom Hearts: Chain of Memories, as a figment of the memories of Sora, the game's protagonist. She is also present in Kingdom Hearts coded, as a data-based version from Jiminy's Journal. Though she does not make an appearance in Kingdom Hearts II, she, along with the other Princesses of Heart, are referenced. In the Japanese version, she was voiced by Mika Doi, and in the English version Alice was originally voiced by her original voice actress Kathryn Beaumont in Kingdom Hearts. However, following her retirement from the role, Alice was voiced by Beaumont's replacement Hynden Walch for the HD Cinematics of Re:Coded in Kingdom Hearts HD 2.5 Remix.

Wonderland is one of four Disney movie-themed worlds accessible in the Nintendo 3DS game Disney Magical World, and Alice is among several characters from the film who appear in the game. The player can also collect items and clothing pieces inspired by the Disney movie.

Alice appears in Disney Magic Kingdoms as a playable character to unlock for a limited time.

==== Other appearances in Disney media ====
She appears in House of Mouse and the direct-to-video releases Mickey's Magical Christmas: Snowed in at the House of Mouse and Mickey's House of Villains, voiced by Hynden Walch. Alice appears as a meetable character in the Walt Disney Parks and Resorts. Alice can also be considered an unofficial Disney Princess, as she appears in many instances of Disney Princess art, videos, and other media, such as being a 'Princess of Heart' in Kingdom Hearts. In the film Who Framed Roger Rabbit, Alice is mentioned as "Allyson Wonderland" on graffiti written on the bathroom wall in Toontown.

Despite not being part of the official Disney Princess lineup, Alice has appeared as a guest character in official Disney Princess art, and is included in the Disney Princess music video "It's Not Just Make Believe" and "The Perfect Princess Tea" with the then eight official princesses.

=== Tim Burton films ===
Alice Kingsleigh (Mia Wasikowska) is a 19-year-old girl "who doesn't quite fit into Victorian society and structure." Her return to Wonderland – having previously visited it as a child, although she has since forgotten it as anything other than a dream, and now required to return to defeat the Jabberwocky – "becomes a rite of passage as she discovers her voice and herself." Screenwriter Linda Woolverton researched how young women were expected to behave in the Victorian era and then made Alice the opposite. Independent columnist Liz Hoggard praised Alice as a role model for girls, describing the character as "stubborn, brave, [and] non-girlie." Alice’s height varies throughout the film from six inches, two feet, eight and a half feet, to a maximum 20 feet (6.1 m). Mairi Ella Challen portrays Alice as a six-year-old. Wasikowska reprised the role in the 2016 sequel Alice Through the Looking Glass.

== Appearances in other media ==
Besides the books and the Disney film, Alice has appeared in many other works:

=== Television ===
A 1966 Hanna-Barbera animated special, Alice in Wonderland or What's a Nice Kid Like You Doing in a Place Like This?, is a modernized take on the book, with Janet Waldo as Alice.

Warehouse 13, a Syfy channel TV series, featured an evil version of Alice during the second half of season 1. In the show, Lewis Carroll's books were not fake, but chronicles based on Alice's Adventures in Wonderland masquerading as fiction. The mirror she passed through, after enough uses, caused Alice to go "Mad as a Hatter", turning her into a sociopathic killer.

In a 1973 episode of Star Trek: The Animated Series, "Once Upon a Planet", Alice asks Lieutenant Uhura where the White Rabbit is.

In the 2009 miniseries Alice, Alice (Caterina Scorsone) is a 20-year-old judo instructor. A man named Jack Chase gives her the Stone of Wonderland before being kidnapped by the White Rabbit. Alice follows Jack to Wonderland, set 150 years after the original adventure, where the Red Queen rules the land.

==== Once Upon a Time ====
Alice is the central character in the 2013 fantasy series Once Upon a Time in Wonderland (a spin-off to Once Upon a Time) portrayed by Sophie Lowe as a teenager and by Millie Bobby Brown as a child. The story is set in a fictional Victorian England-themed world and takes place after Alice has returned from Wonderland. Due to the stories she tells about the hookah-smoking caterpillar and Cyrus, played by Peter Gadiot, the genie she fell in love with and believed to be dead, she is declared insane and placed in London’s Bethlem Asylum. The doctors decide that the best treatment for Alice is a procedure that will make her forget Wonderland and the events that happened there, which Alice agrees to due to wanting to forget her painful past. The night before the procedure, the White Rabbit, voiced by John Lithgow, and the Knave of Hearts, played by Michael Socha, arrive in the asylum and tell Alice that Cyrus is not dead, but may be in danger. Hearing this, Alice agrees to return to Wonderland and help find her true love. It is later revealed that Cyrus is being held prisoner by Jafar (played by Naveen Andrews), who wants to use Cyrus’ magic to take over Wonderland and is working with the evil Red Queen (played by Emma Rigby). Throughout the series, Alice and the Knave of Hearts work together to rescue Cyrus and stop the Red Queen and Jafar from wreaking havoc in Wonderland.

An alternate version of Alice is a recurring character in the seventh season of the fantasy series Once Upon a Time, portrayed by Rose Reynolds. She is the daughter of the Wish Realm version of Killian Jones (played by Colin O'Donoghue) and Mother Gothel (played by Emma Booth). Alice is the lover of Robin, played by Tiera Skovbye, who is the daughter of Robin Hood (Sean Maguire) and Zelena (Rebecca Mader). Her cursed identity in Hyperion Heights was "Tilly".

=== Films ===
In the 1987 film The Care Bears Adventure in Wonderland, Alice (voiced by Tracey Moore) is a young and shy blonde girl with an apparent self-esteem problem, as she thinks that she is not "special," until the Care Bears decide she is the girl who more closely resembles the missing Princess of Wonderland. As such, Alice takes the place of the Princess and ultimately learns to believe in herself. In the film, Alice is shown wearing casual clothing, consisting of a white shirt with a pink stripe, purple pants, a blue jacket, and pink shoes, and wearing her hair in a ponytail.

The Czech surrealist Jan Švankmajer retold the story in a dark 1988 film titled Alice. Kristýna Kohoutová portrayed her and her English dub was done by Camilla Power. Woody Allen's film Alice, while not a direct adaptation, follows a woman who has a series of surreal adventures.

Alice is voiced by Simone Ashley in the 2024 animated movie The Night Before Christmas in Wonderland.

=== Comics ===
Alice Fairchild appears as an aging woman and a 14-year-old girl in Alan Moore and Melinda Gebbie's 1991 explicit graphic novel Lost Girls.

In Alan Moore and Kevin O'Neill's League Of Extraordinary Gentlemen, Alice is referred to as Miss A. L.

Alice Liddell is one of the main characters in Andy Weir and Sarah Andersen's webcomic Cheshire Crossing.

Alice appears as a college-attending teenager alongside Wendy Darling, Dorothy Gale, and Susan Pevensie in Chicago of 2005 and 2006, in the comic book series The Oz/Wonderland Chronicles.

Alice Liddle is the main character of Zenescope Entertainment's Grimm Fairy Tales: Return to Wonderland (2007–08), Alice In Wonderland (2012), Wonderland (2012–16), and Wonderland: Down the Rabbit Hole (2013).

A decolonising rewriting of Alice's Adventures in Wonderland with Alice recast as a non-binary Ojibwe-Anishinaabe teenager, Aimée, appeared in 2021 as Rabbit Chase.

=== Manga and anime ===
Alice has appeared in two manga by CLAMP: Miyuki-chan in Wonderland (1993) and Key Princess Story: Eternal Alice Rondo

In the manga Pandora Hearts, Alice is the heroine and has a twin sister, the white-haired The Intention of Abyss, who are based on the Red Queen and White Queen as well as Alice and her sister. Their companions, Oz the B-Rabbit and Cheshire Cat, were originally a stuffed rabbit and a cat, but later become Chains with human bodies. Their mother's name, Lacie, is an anagram of Alice.

In the shoujo manga Alice in Murderland, the main protagonist dresses up as the titular character.

In season 2 of the 2011 anime Black Butler, the main character, Ciel, is read Alice in Wonderland by his butler Sebastian while in a coma. As a result, Ciel dreamt that he was Alice.

In the Ouran High School Host Club episode "Haruhi in Wonderland", protagonist Haruhi Fujioka falls asleep and finds herself in an adapted version of Wonderland.

In the Cardcaptor Sakura, episode Sakura and Sakura from Wonderland, the majority of the episode pays homage to the story, with Sakura Kinomoto playing Alice.

In the sequel series Cardcaptor Sakura Clear Card, Akiho Shinomoto invites Sakura Kinomoto and Tomoyo Daidouji to her home to visit her library, where Akiho picks up a book titled Alice in Clockland.

On July 30, 2011, Alice in the Country of Hearts was released.

=== Video games ===
She appears in Atlus' 1992 video game Shin Megami Tensei as a mini-boss, and has since become a staple demon in the Megami Tensei series. Her appearance and abilities are based on Carrol's character and popular media depictions, while her violent behavior and demeanor are said to be based on a European legend used to scare unruly children into behaving. The myth describes a deceased girl's spirit, who kills misbehaving children so that they can be friends in death.

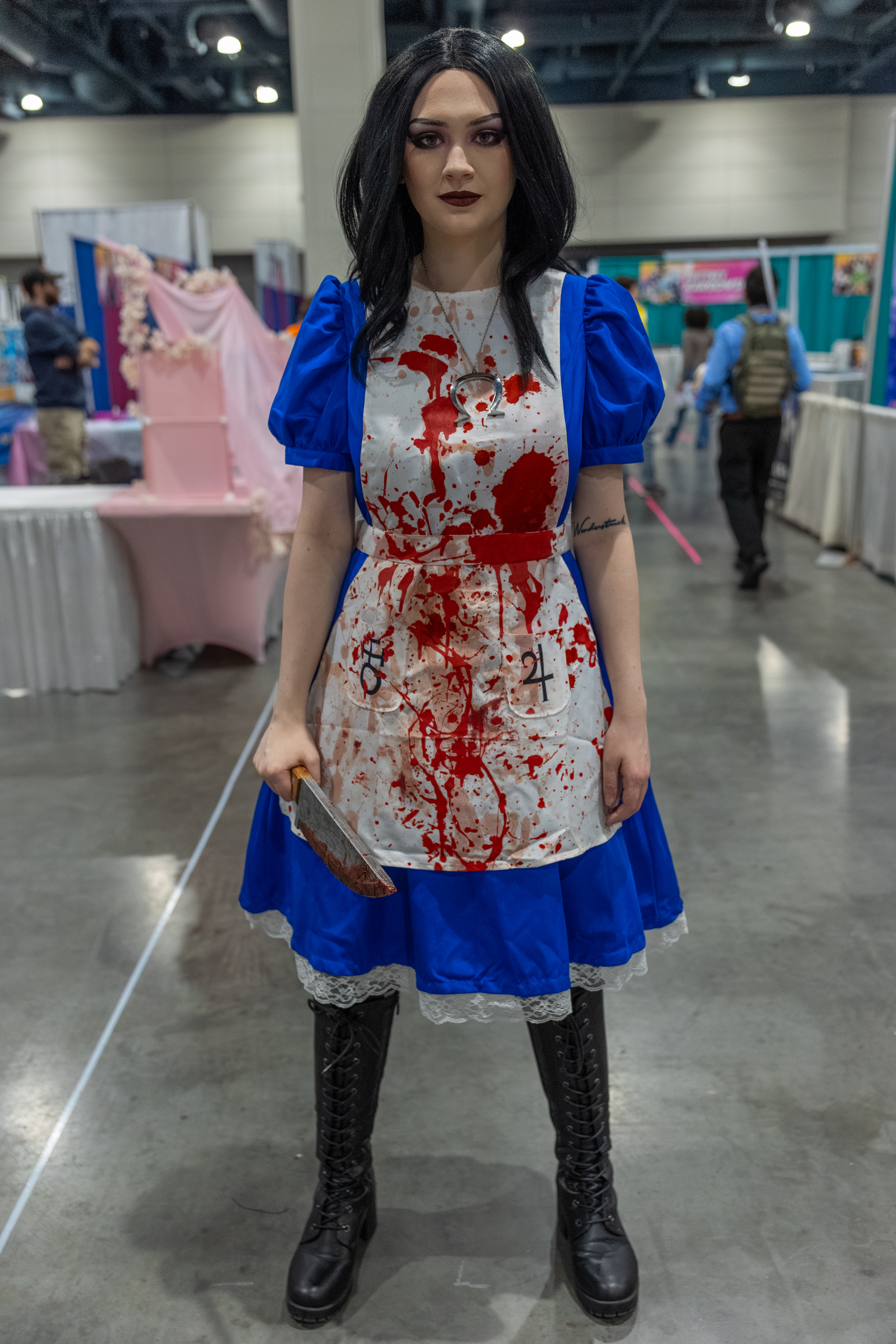
Cosplay of Alice from Alice: Madness Returns, 2026.

In the 2000 PC game American McGee's Alice, Alice is portrayed as an older, dark-brown haired girl with emerald green eyes. In the game, Alice is a tortured young woman who was orphaned at a young age when her parents and her sister were burned alive in an accidental fire caused by her cat Dinah. Afterward, she falls into a catatonic state, and is condemned to Rutledge's Asylum for treatment. She remains there for many years, faced with her own survivor's guilt and the mistreatment of patients in the mental hospitals of the time. Then, the White Rabbit arrives in her cell and tells her she must return to Wonderland and save its creatures from the tyrannical Queen of Hearts. By doing so, she not only saves Wonderland, but her own sanity.

In the 2011 sequel, Alice: Madness Returns, Alice, voiced by Susie Brann, is once again tormented by hallucinations of a corrupted Wonderland, being destroyed by the mysterious Infernal Train and increasingly blending with reality. Throughout the game, she battles the mysterious Ruin, a mark of the Train's influence on Alice's mind, while struggling to piece together her repressed memories of the fire that killed her parents and sister. The second game gives her last name as "Liddell," which is the last name of the girl rumored to have inspired Alice.

The 2003 video game Alice in the Country of Hearts. which got a manga adaptation.

In Sunsoft's 2006 mobile game Alice's Warped Wonderland (歪みの国のアリス, Yugami no kuni no Arisu; Alice in Distortion World), Alice is re-imagined as a sixteen-year-old Japanese girl named Ariko Katsuragi, also called "Alice" by the Wonderland denizens due to "Alice" sounding similar to "Ariko" in Japanese and her younger self in the real world as well. In the game, Ariko is a quiet, normal girl who is constantly bewildered by the bizarreness of Wonderland. Ariko suffers from suicidal depression after losing her father in a fire at age four, enduring years of abuse from her mentally and emotionally unstable mother, and nearly killing herself after witnessing her mother almost murdering her fiancé during one of her psychotic episodes. Throughout the game, Ariko and the Cheshire Cat chase after the White Rabbit, unlocking the tragic memories she suppressed in her mind and regaining her will to live along the way. In this iteration, Ariko is stated to be Wonderland's creator but not the ruler and is beloved by its residents, though her depression greatly warped many characters' love for her, as Wonderland is her coping mechanism to deal with her traumatic childhood. In the bad endings of the game, Ariko can die by the hands of the other characters, have a complete mental breakdown, or kill herself after being unable to overcome her trauma.

In the RPG Maker game series Black Souls, Alice is the first character the player meets in the initial game, where they decide upon a name and class before she dies. Alice is featured in a main role within the second game, as she becomes a more prominent character that the player is searching for within Wonderland. The player can decide which "type" of Alice they want from three options within the starting cutscene. There are multiple iterations of Alice within the second game with varying appearances and personalities that the player may find within Wonderland.

In the 2026 puzzle, psychological horror, point-and-click, Role-Playing Game "Habromania" (named for an insanity inducing feelings of joy), Alice is the main character. She is a 19 year old girl in 1914 Great Britain. At some point in her past, she had a brother who was once a soldier who ended up dying in a car crash after she took the wheel. Some time later, after being traumatized by her brother’s death, she was sent to Rosewell asylum, and fell down a rabbit hole near the asylum’s premises. She awakes in Wonderland with no memories but her name, age, how to speak English, and basic bodily functions. Throughout the game, she finds statues (remarking at the statue of a pregnant lady that she hopes she’ll learn her mother’s identity), fixes old water systems, and searches for an escape. The demo is currently the only version out, which ends with her badgering the Cheshire Cat into giving her the key to an abandoned home. The creator has said that in other endings Alice may be lobotomized, kill all the guards of the asylum, or stay in Wonderland. The tarot card of "The Fool" is the card representing Alice in this game.

=== Novels ===
In Frank Beddor's 2004 novel, The Looking Glass Wars, an adaptation of the Alice books, Alice is re-imagined as Alyss Heart, the rightful heir to the throne of Wonderland and a warrior princess with magical powers. The preface of the story is that Alyss fled to Earth, where she met Lewis Carroll and told him her story. He then turned it into a nonsensical fairytale in which he misspelled her name.

Alice is a rebellious teenager in Raul Alberto Contreras dark-humored novel Alice's Bloody Adventures in Wonderland.

=== Other ===
In the Tokyo Disneyland DreamLights version of the Main Street Electrical Parade, Alice is voiced by Kat Cressida.

Alice appears in the Mad T Party at Disney's California Adventure park, based on Tim Burton's version of Alice. She is often found onstage doing vocals in the Mad T Party band alongside the Mad Hatter.

In Mattel's doll franchise Ever After High, Alice has a child named Alistair Wonderland.

== See also ==
- Alice (Alice's Adventures in Wonderland)
- Films and television programmes based on Alice in Wonderland
- List of minor characters in the Alice series
