= You Are Old, Father William =

Poem by Lewis Carroll

"You Are Old, Father William" is a poem by Lewis Carroll that appears in his 1865 book Alice's Adventures in Wonderland. It is recited by Alice in Chapter 5, "Advice from a Caterpillar" (Chapter 3 in the original manuscript). Alice informs the Caterpillar that she has previously tried to repeat "How Doth the Little Busy Bee" and has had it all come wrong as "How Doth the Little Crocodile". The Caterpillar asks her to repeat "You Are Old, Father William", and she recites it.

== Poem ==
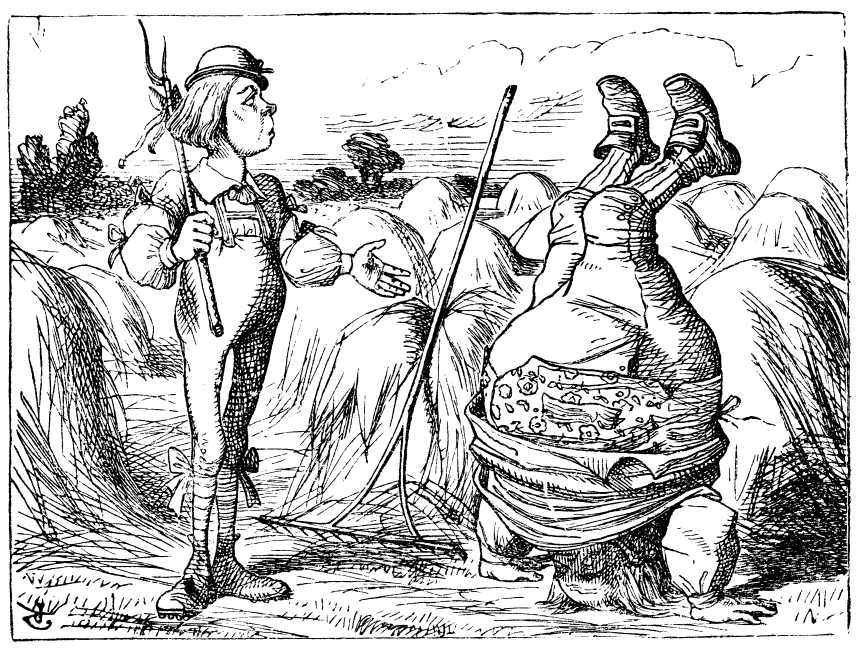
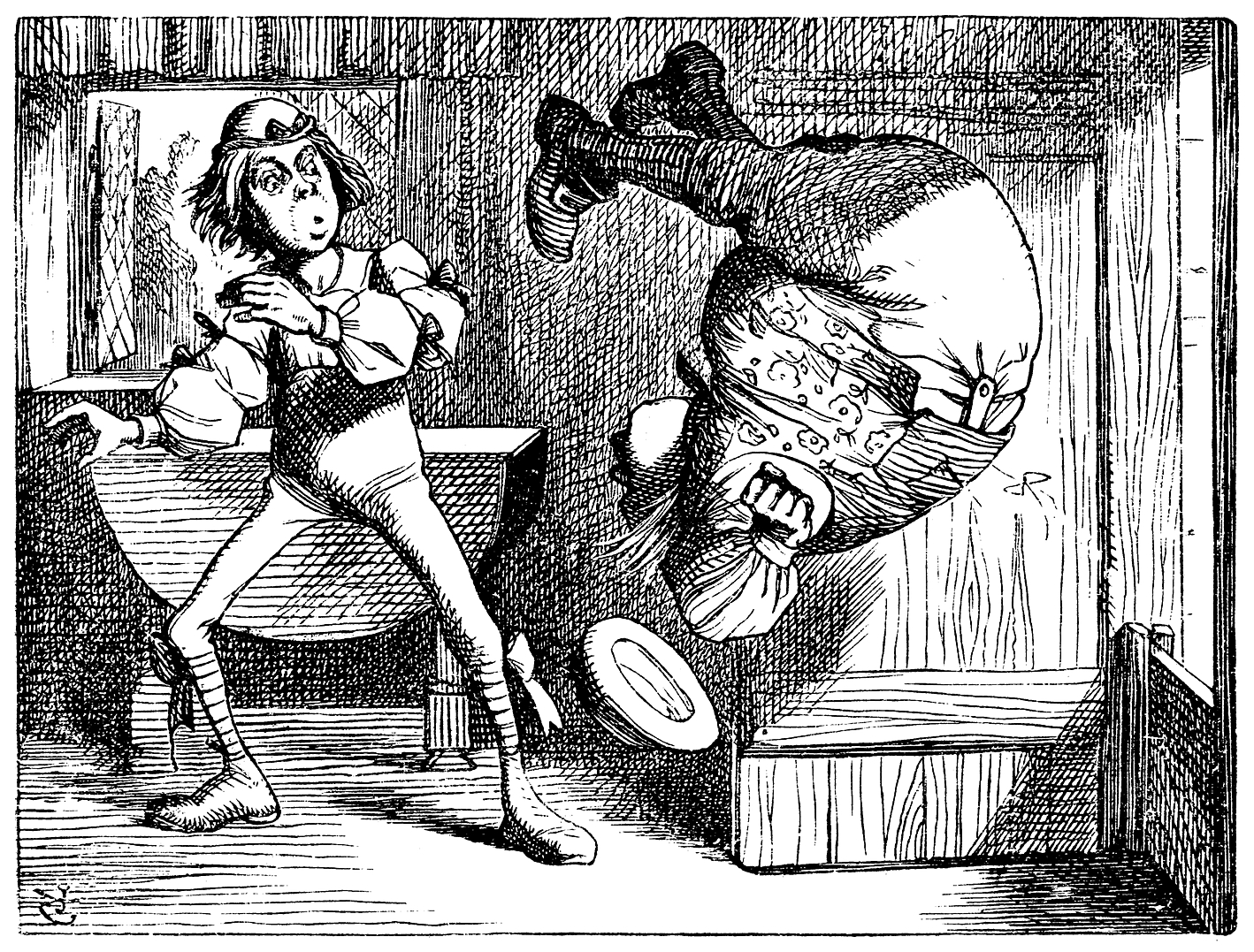
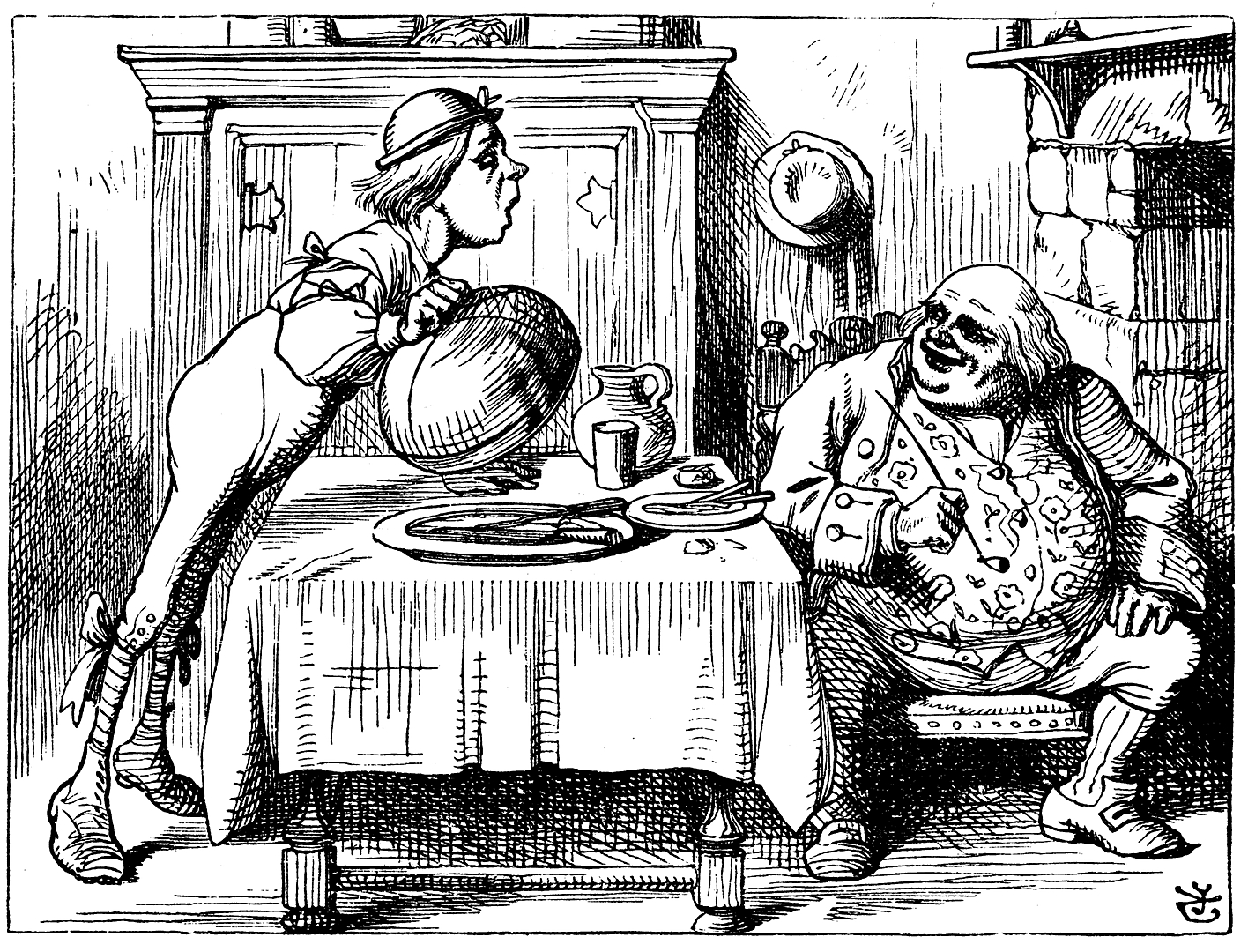
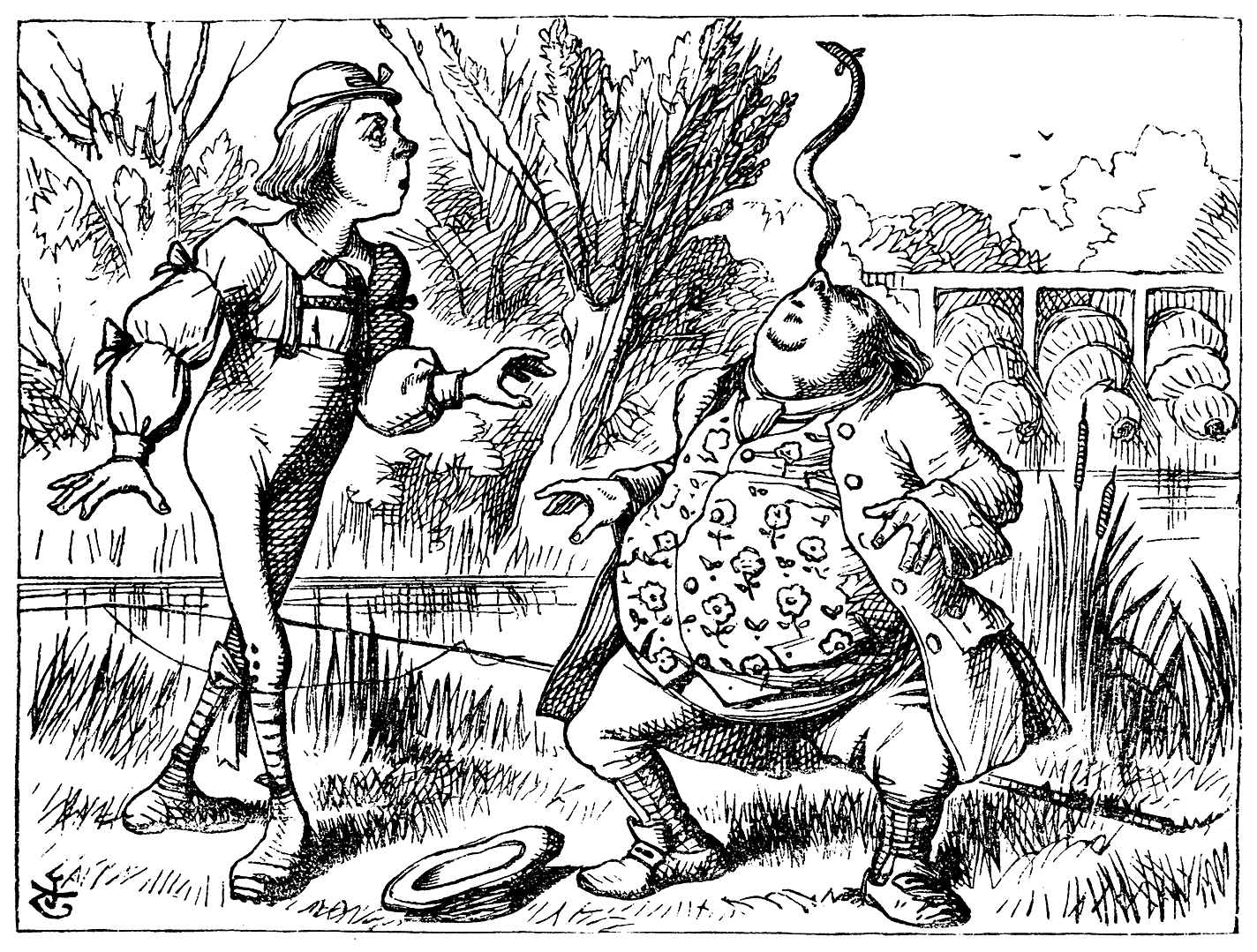
John Tenniel's illustrations accompany the poem

"You are old, Father William," the young man said,
"And your hair has become very white;
And yet you incessantly stand on your head—
Do you think, at your age, it is right?"

"In my youth," Father William replied to his son,
"I feared it might injure the brain;
But now that I'm perfectly sure I have none,
Why, I do it again and again."

"You are old," said the youth, "as I mentioned before,
And have grown most uncommonly fat;
Yet you turned a back-somersault in at the door—
Pray, what is the reason of that?"

"In my youth," said the sage, as he shook his grey locks,
"I kept all my limbs very supple
By the use of this ointment—one shilling the box—
Allow me to sell you a couple."

"You are old," said the youth, "and your jaws are too weak
For anything tougher than suet;
Yet you finished the goose, with the bones and the beak—
Pray, how did you manage to do it?"

"In my youth," said his father, "I took to the law,
And argued each case with my wife;
And the muscular strength, which it gave to my jaw,
Has lasted the rest of my life."

"You are old," said the youth, "one would hardly suppose
That your eye was as steady as ever;
Yet you balanced an eel on the end of your nose—
What made you so awfully clever?"

"I have answered three questions, and that is enough,"
Said his father; "don't give yourself airs!
Do you think I can listen all day to such stuff?
Be off, or I'll kick you downstairs!"

== Provenance ==
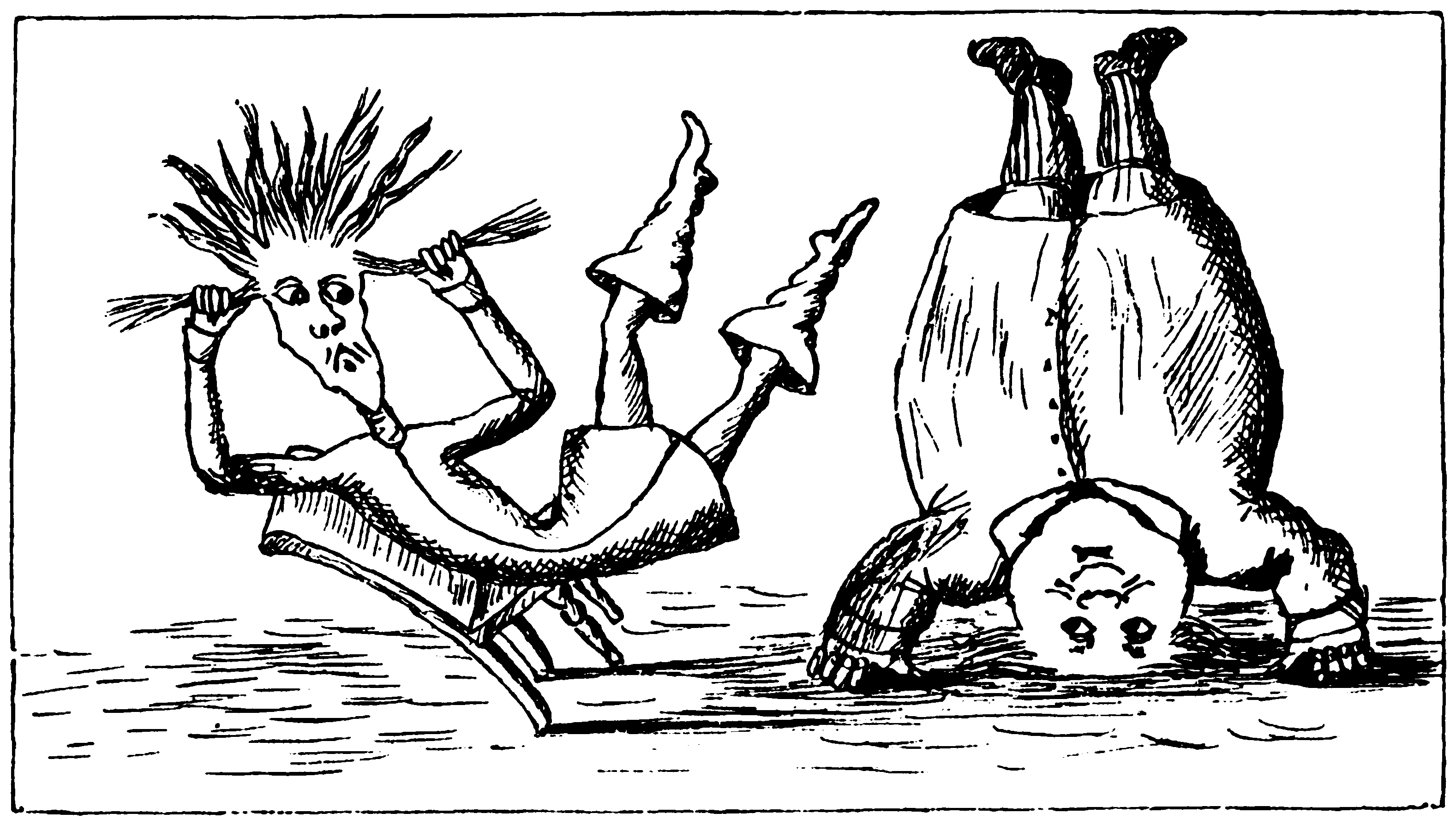
Illustration for the poem by Lewis Carroll

Like most poems in Alice, the poem is a parody of a poem then well-known to children, Robert Southey's didactic poem "The Old Man's Comforts and How He Gained Them", originally published in 1799. Like the other poems parodied by Carroll in Alice, this original poem is now mostly forgotten, and only the parody is remembered. Carroll's parody "undermines the pious didacticism of Southey's original and gives Father William an eccentric vitality that rebounds upon his idiot questioner". Martin Gardner calls it "one of the undisputed masterpieces of nonsense verse". Since then, it has been parodied further, including more than 20 versions by 1886, a version by Charles Larcom Graves, a writer for Punch in 1889, and "You are young, Kaiser William".

== Appearances ==
The 1915 film version of Alice is notable for depicting much of the 'Father William' poem and it includes footage resembling Tenniel's illustration of Father William doing his back-somersault at the front door.

In the Walt Disney animated film Alice in Wonderland (1951) the first stanza of the poem is recited by Tweedledum and Tweedledee as a song.

"Father William" was played by Sammy Davis Jr. in the 1985 film. Davis Jr. also sang the poem.

The 1999 film briefly shows Father William as Alice recites the first verse of the poem to the Caterpillar.

They Might Be Giants recorded a song using the lyrics of the poem for the compilation album Almost Alice for the 2010 film Alice in Wonderland.

The poem's first stanza makes an appearance in the mystery comedy drama Monk, in Season 4's episode "Mr. Monk Goes to a Wedding", where a supporting character recites the poem in an attempt to stall the killer's plan.
