= Spendthrift (disambiguation) =

A Spendthrift is someone who spends money prodigiously.

Spendthrift or The Spendthrift may also refer to:

- Spendthrift (horse) (1876–1900), American Thoroughbred racehorse and sire
- Spendthrift (film), 1936 American film
- The Spendthrift (1910 play) by written Porter Emerson Browne
- The Spendthrift (novel), 1857 historical novel by the British author William Harrison Ainsworth
- The Spendthrift (1915 film), American silent film drama directed by Walter Edwin
- The Spendthrift (1917 film), Austrian silent historical film directed by Jacob Fleck
- The Spendthrift (1953 film), Austrian historical film directed by Leopold Hainisch
- The Spendthrift (1964 film), Austrian historical film directed by Kurt Meisel

== See also ==
- Spendthrift trust, trust that gives the trustee authority to make decisions on how the funds may be spent
- Spendthrift Farm, thoroughbred race horse breeding farm in Lexington, Kentucky
