= Kathryn Beaumont =

British actress (born 1937)

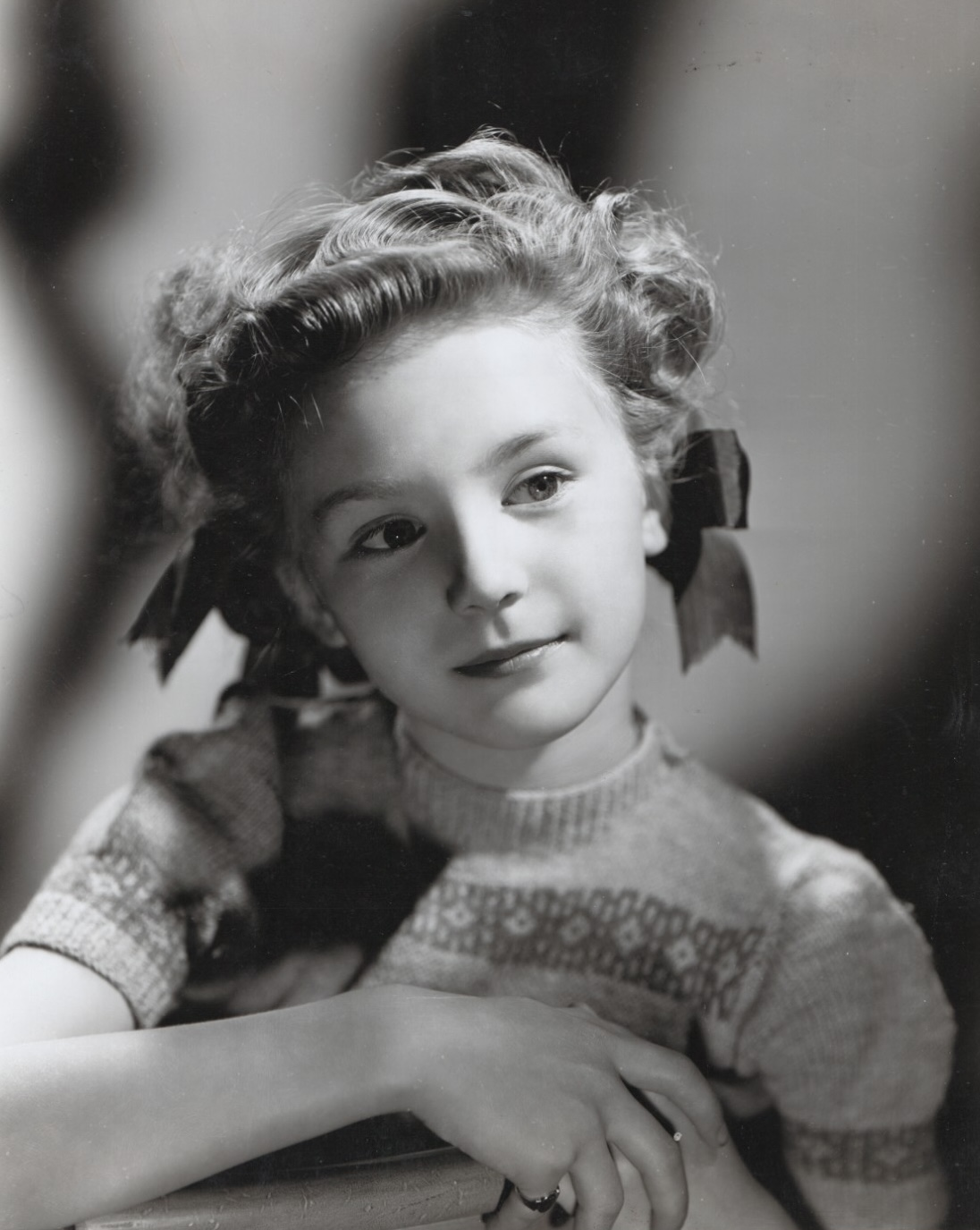
- Beaumont in 1948
- Born: Kathryn Priscilla Beaumont; 27 June 1937 (age 89); Victoria Park, Manchester, England
- Education: University of Southern California
- Occupation: Actress
- Years active: 1944–2005; 2010; 2023–present
- Known for: Alice in Wonderland; Peter Pan
- Spouse: Allan Levine (m. 1985)
- Awards: Disney Legend (1998)

Kathryn Priscilla Beaumont (born 27 June 1937) is a British actress. She is best known for voicing Alice in Alice in Wonderland (1951) and Wendy Darling in Peter Pan (1953), for which she was named a Disney Legend in 1998.

== Early life ==
Beaumont was born to Evelyn and Kenneth Beaumont in Victoria Park, Manchester, England, on 27 June 1937. Evelyn was a professional dancer, while Kenneth was a singer with British dance bands, including those led by Henry Hall and Oscar Rabin.

Beaumont was an infant when World War II began. Though authorities in war-torn England urged Evelyn to send her daughter to safety on the SS Athenia, Evelyn refused. Authorities were very upset at first, but when the ship sank, they "ceased to scold" her for her decision. However, after frequent bombing raids—and witnessing the death of a close friend—Evelyn and Kathryn moved to the safer, smaller area of Bangor, Wales. When the war ended in 1945, all three of the Beaumonts moved back to London.

Beaumont's first experience with acting came when Evelyn enrolled her in school, "when she was still very small." There, she acted in a school pantomime and later in a play. After watching Beaumont perform, her teacher told her mother that she had a talent for acting.

== Career ==
Beaumont made her feature film debut in It Happened One Sunday (1944). The film drew interest from Metro-Goldwyn-Mayer, who offered her a contract. She recalled: "MGM was planning to have films with British characters and British-type stories. However, as ideas come and go, they must have shelved the idea because they brought me over and put me under contract, then nothing happened." In spite of this, she did play small parts in MGM's On an Island with You (1948), where she did a Jimmy Durante impression in front of Durante's character, a non-speaking, uncredited role in The Secret Garden (1949) and another uncredited role in Challenge to Lassie (1949), though she did appear on one of the film's lobby cards.

After Beaumont had relocated to Los Angeles at the age of 10, Walt Disney Pictures began auditioning young British actresses to portray Alice in their animated version of Alice in Wonderland (1951). Beaumont auditioned three times and received the role, working under voice director Winston Hibler. While filming Alice in Wonderland, Beaumont's mother and tutor stayed on set with her. Though she worked four hours a day, she still studied three. After filming finished, Beaumont went on a promotional tour, which included several on-screen appearances with Walt Disney.

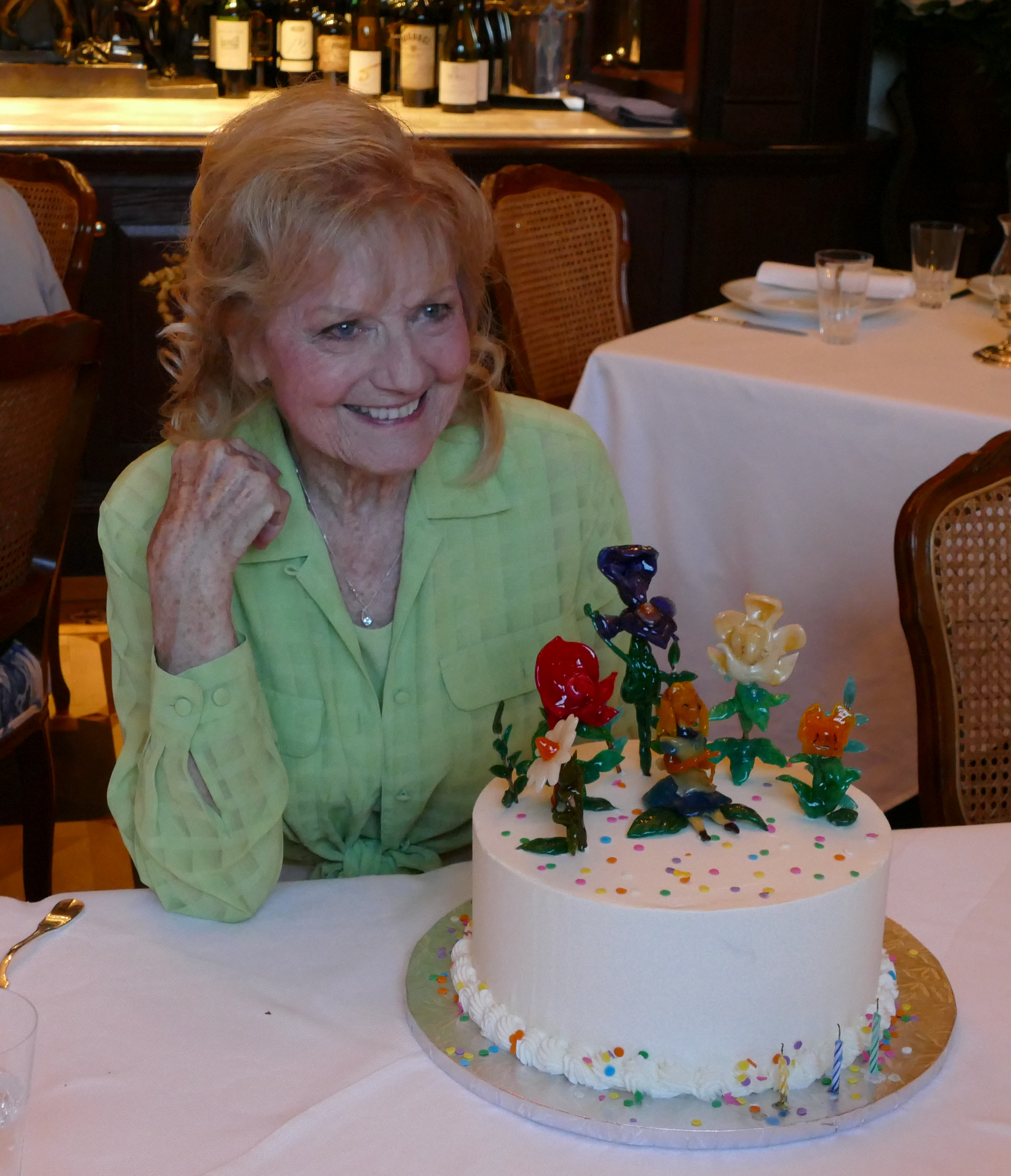
Kathyrn Beaumont's 80th birthday party celebration at Club 33 in 2017

Disney subsequently cast Beaumont in the voice role of Wendy Darling in their following feature, Peter Pan (1953), which began production in 1951. In addition to voicing Wendy, Beaumont also served as a performance model for live-action reference to help the animators. When performing as Wendy, Beaumont was suspended in the air to simulate flight, although she had a fear of heights. When asked how she overcame her fear of heights, Beaumont answered, "[I] gritted my teeth! That's about all you can do. I thought, 'Oh, well, I have to do what I have to do.' So you grit your teeth and you do it."

Beaumont reprised her voice acting role as Alice in two episodes of the animated series House of Mouse (2001–2003) and as both Alice and Wendy in the 2002 video game Kingdom Hearts. In 1998, Beaumont was awarded a Disney Legend award for her voice work on Alice in Wonderland and Peter Pan.

In 2005, Beaumont retired from acting; the roles of Alice and Wendy were taken over by Hynden Walch. Beaumont made a brief return to voice acting in 2010 when she voiced Kairi's grandmother in Disney's Kingdom Hearts Birth by Sleep. In 2023, she guest-starred as Alice in the second season of Alice's Wonderland Bakery.

After completing Peter Pan, Beaumont enrolled in high school, where she joined a drill team and ran for a position in student government. After graduating, Beaumont enrolled at the University of Southern California, where she graduated with a degree in education. Upon graduating from college, Beaumont worked as an elementary school teacher in Los Angeles for 36 years.

== Personal life ==
Beaumont has been married to her husband, Allan Levine, since 1985.

== Filmography ==
=== Film ===
Year	Title	Role	Notes
1944	It Happened One Sunday	Jill Buckland	
1948	On an Island with You	Penelope Peabody	
1949	The Secret Garden	Muriel	Uncredited
1949	Challenge to Lassie	Tenement Child	Uncredited
1951	Operation Wonderland	Herself / Alice	
1951	Alice in Wonderland	Alice (voice)	Live-action reference
1953	Peter Pan	Wendy Darling (voice)	Live-action reference
1963	Noddy Goes to Toyland	Noddy, Mrs. Tubby Bear, Mrs. Noah, Little Doll, Little Doll's Mother (voice)	Uncredited
2003	101 Dalmatians II: Patch's London Adventure	Crystal (voice)	

=== Television ===
Year	Title	Role	Notes
1950	One Hour in Wonderland	Herself / Alice	
1951	The Fred Waring Show	Alice	
1951	What's My Line	Herself	1 episode
1951	Operation Wonderland	Herself / Alice	Segment of Ford Star Revue
1951	Walt Disney Christmas Show	Herself/ Wendy	1 episode
1955	TV Reader's Digest	Priscilla Mullins	Episode: "The Voyage of Captain Tom Jones, the Pirate"
1955	Climax!	Dorrant's Daughter	Episode: "The First and the Last"
1958	From All of Us to All of You	Wendy (voice)	Television special
2002	House of Mouse	Alice (voice)	2 episodes
2023	Alice's Wonderland Bakery	Original Alice (voice)	Episode: "Alice's First Day in Wonderland"

=== Video games ===
Year	Title	Role	Notes
1999	Disney's Villains' Revenge	Alice	
2002	Kingdom Hearts	Alice, Wendy Darling	
2010	Kingdom Hearts Birth by Sleep	Kairi's Grandmother	
2013	Kingdom Hearts HD 1.5 Remix	Alice, Wendy Darling	Archive audio
2014	Kingdom Hearts HD 2.5 Remix	Kairi's Grandmother	Archive audio
2016	Kingdom Hearts χ	Kairi's Grandmother	Archive audio

=== Theme parks ===
Year	Title	Role	Notes
1982	Alice in Wonderland	Alice	Voice
1992	Fantasmic!	Wendy Darling	Voice

=== Radio ===
Beaumont made three appearances on Lux Radio Theatre.

Caption text
Episode title	Role	Date
"Treasure Island"	Herself / interstitial ad	January 29, 1951
"Alice in Wonderland"	Alice	Dec. 24, 1951
"Peter Pan"	Wendy	21 Dec 1953

== Awards and nominations ==
Awards and nominations
Year	Award	Category	Title	Result
1998	Disney Legend Award	Animation – Voice		Won
