= Disney's Villains' Revenge =

1999 video game

- Cover art
- Developer: Disney Interactive
- Publisher: Disney Interactive
- Designers: Will Panganiban; Roger Holzberg
- Programmers: Andy Fisher; Elaine McClay; Scott Santos
- Artists: Mike Cukar; Robert Miles; Tim Decker
- Writer: Gregor Joackim
- Composers: Bill Brown; Mike Reagan
- Platforms: Mac OS; Microsoft Windows
- Release: US: September 28, 1999; EU: 2001
- Genre: Puzzle
- Mode: Single-player

Disney's Villains' Revenge is a 1999 puzzle video game developed and published by Disney Interactive for Microsoft Windows and Macintosh. It was released in the United States on September 28, 1999. The gameplay is an interactive "point-and-click" method in various forms, featuring the player helping Jiminy Cricket save the happy endings of several of the Disney's animated films from the vengeful, greedy Disney Villains.

== Plot ==
The game's story is set in the bedroom of the player, presumably a child. Jiminy Cricket (Eddie Carroll) is the guardian of a book in the player's room which features several stories with happy endings. However, the book's happy ending pages are ripped out by a very bored Jiminy Cricket, who has read them so often that they put him to sleep. As a game to make it very interesting, he asks the player to put them back to the story where they belong, when suddenly the book is possessed by the spirits of several Disney Villains, namely Captain Hook (Corey Burton) from Peter Pan; Evil Queen (Louise Chamis) from Snow White and the Seven Dwarfs; The Queen of Hearts (Tress MacNeille) from Alice in Wonderland; and the Ringmaster (Corey Burton) from Dumbo, who alter the stories to their advantage, without the presence of happy endings. The Blue Fairy (Rosalyn Landor) appears and explains that because stories live on in the hearts of readers, by removing the happy endings, the stories were left at their climax with the heroes in peril and the villains in control. Jiminy and the player venture into the worlds of the stories, via the cover door, to correct the happy endings.

In the altered stories, Queen Grimhilde, in her transformation as a witch, has built a giant house resembling her infamous poisoned apple and has put Snow White to sleep and intends to do the same to the seven dwarfs. The player must use the spellbook to free the Prince (Michael Gough), whom she trapped by magic, so that the Prince kisses Snow White to wake her up. The Ringmaster forces a now flightless Dumbo to endlessly perform humiliating stunts in his circus, and the player must help Dumbo fly again by making the circus contraption perfect so that they can force the clown to perform the humiliating stunts. The Queen of Hearts has had Alice (Kathryn Beaumont) beheaded, although the girl does remain alive despite the separation of her body and head, and the player must find Alice's head to piece her back together, so that the White Rabbit (Corey Burton) must lead them home. Peter Pan (Michael Welch) is an old man (Kevin Schon), which makes it too hard for him to fight Hook, and the player must pick up Peter's sword to win the swashbuckling sword fight against Hook and his pirate crew, so that Tick-Tock the Crocodile can chase him away, and Peter turns back into a young boy again.

The villains steal the happy ending pages, changing the bedroom into a battlefield mixed with their four areas. The player uses the book as a shield to deflect the villains' attacks and defeats each one (Hook is sent flying by a reflected cannonball, Queen Grimhilde is seemingly frightened to death by her own reflection when it shattered, the Queen of Hearts surrenders when a hedge maze topiary statue she hides in is destroyed by the player shooting hedgehogs, and the Ringmaster is knocked unconscious by a well aimed custard pie). All of the happy endings are restored at the end of the game with a new story called "Villain's Night Out" telling of how Jiminy redeems himself and the player who saves the heroes and becomes the greatest one of all. As reward the Blue Fairy said the player can visit those worlds again anytime and leaves a surprise in the toys the player owns before leaving.

== Gameplay ==
The gameplay is an interactive point-and-click style that can take various forms. The cursor usually resembles Jiminy's glove. Most of the games involve a click-and-drag routine (e.g. dragging branches of thorns off of a trapped Jiminy in the Snow White world). In the Queen of Hearts labyrinth world, the player has to listen out for Alice's voice and decide on a direction to go in the maze to locate her head. In the Neverland world, the player has to move the mouse to combat Captain Hook with a sword, through which the mouse's movements are shown, much like how the Wii gameplay works.

In the final boss battles against the game's four villains, the game goes into a point of view similar to what one might find in a first-person shooter game. The player uses the storybook as a shield to block and deflect fired projectiles at the enemies of the game. Upon completing the game, several minigames are unlocked.

== Development ==
In 1996, Walt Disney Imagineering art director Terry Dobson pitched a game called Virtual Magic Kingdom, a multi-disc game where villains take over the Magic Kingdom, and the player is a special guest who has one night to save the park. Roger Holzberg was recruited out of Knowledge Adventure to lead in-house development at Disney Interactive, and oversaw the project. According to Dobson and Holzberg, the crossover nature of the game went against prior mandates by Roy E. Disney, whose approval would begin a wave of similar projects across the company.

VMK was mostly scrapped by 1998, due to a number of intervening factors. Villains' Revenge was assembled from select areas of the Fantasyland section of the original VMK project, with the framing device changed from the Magic Kingdom to a bedroom. Much of the team, including Dobson and Holzberg, would move to Disney's Parks and Resorts Online division, where the name was revived in 2005 for the Virtual Magic Kingdom MMO game.

The game incorporates full motion video via the DreamFactory engine licensed from Bill Appleton. Traditional animation was outsourced to Karen Johnson Productions, and ink and paint was conducted by Virtual Magic.

According to the concept art, Stromboli was going to be a villain in this video game in a Pinocchio-based world, but he was replaced by the Ringmaster of Dumbo.

== Reception ==
Monika Lechl from German magazine PC Player gave the game a score of 68%.

During the 3rd Annual Interactive Achievement Awards, the Academy of Interactive Arts & Sciences awarded Disney's Villains' Revenge with "PC Children's Entertainment Title of the Year", along with nominations for "Outstanding Achievement in Animation" and "Outstanding Achievement in Art Direction".
