= Alice in Wonderland (1915 film) =

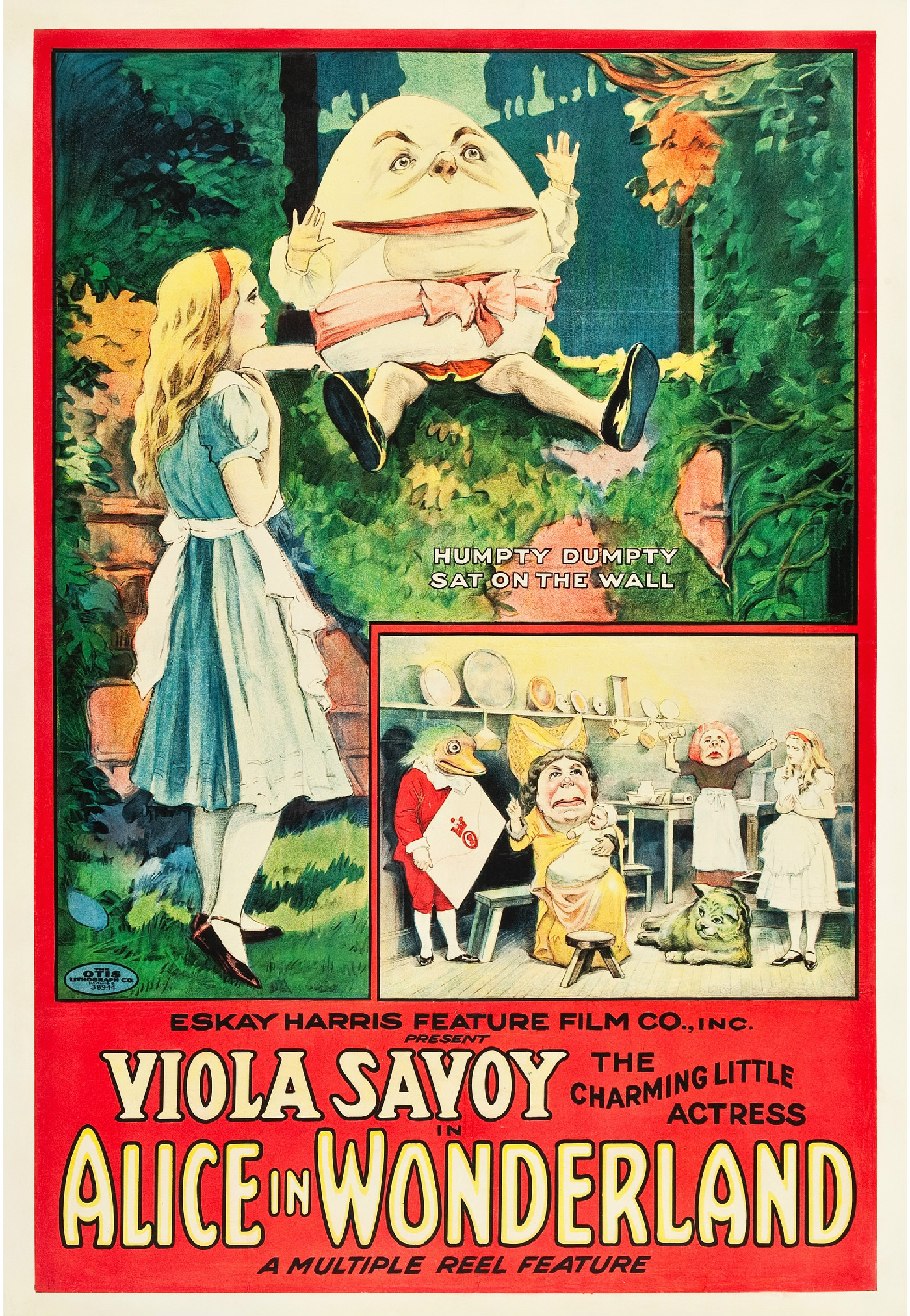
- Theatrical release poster
- Directed by: W.W. Young
- Screenplay by: W.W. Young
- Based on: Alice's Adventures in Wonderland and Through the Looking-Glass by Lewis Carroll
- Starring: Viola Savoy
- Distributed by: American Film Manufacturing Company; Nonpareil Feature Film Corp
- Release date: January 19, 1915
- Running time: 52 minutes
- Country: United States
- Language: Silent film (English intertitles)

Alice in Wonderland is a 1915 American silent film adaptation of Lewis Carroll's classic 1865 novel, Alice's Adventures in Wonderland, directed and written by W. W. Young and starring Viola Savoy as Alice.

This film version is notable for depicting much of the 'Father William' poem and it includes footage resembling Tenniel's illustration of Father William doing his back-somersault at the front door.

The film was the first Alice film to combine the chapters from Through the Looking-Glass with those of Alice’s Adventures in Wonderland. However, most of the looking-glass portion is lost.

== Plot ==
Alice in Wonderland (1915)

Alice lives happily until chasing a White Rabbit. She swims in her own tears and meets a Mouse, a Dodo, and an Owl. They then have a Caucus Race (lost footage). Alice comes face to face with weird men called Tweedledee and Tweedledum (lost footage). She meets the Caterpillar, then runs away and meets the Cheshire Cat. She finds the Mad Hatter and March Hare, who live at a tea party in the woods. Alice then meets the Lion and the Unicorn (lost footage). She then meets the Duchess and a Mock Turtle. She then encounters Humpty Dumpty (lost footage). Alice then meets a Puppy, and The Queen of Hearts. They then play an odd game of Croquet, and attend a trial. Alice offends the Queen, who chokes her. Alice then wakes up on the riverbank, where she fell asleep while sitting with her elder sister and discovers that her adventures were a dream.

== Cast ==
- Alice - Viola Savoy
- White Rabbit - Herbert Rice
- The Mad Hatter - William Tilden
- The Dormouse - Louis Merkle
- The Dodo - Harry Marks
- Alice's Mother - Lotta Savoy

== Premiere ==
The premiere was held at the Strand Theatre in New York. A review said:

The huge audience at the Strand Theatre received this first production in moving pictures of Lewis Carroll's delightful nonsense story with all the enthusiasm which the rare good judgment shown throughout by both director and scenario writer merited. Viola Savoy looked and was Alice, and Herbert Rice, as W. Rabbit, led her into Wonder-land. Theirs, of course, were the most important parts and they did them justice. There were many pretty scenes, among them the pool of water disclosed when Alice opens the door in the tree, and Mr. Rabbit's little home, and the photo-play was indeed delightful.

"You are old, Father William," the young man said, "And your hair has become very white. And yet you incessantly stand on your head— Do you think, at your age, it is right?"

Yes, Father William was there, too. He not only stands on his head, but he "turns a back somersault in at the door and balances an eel on his nose."
