= Viola Savoy =

American actress (1899 – 1987)

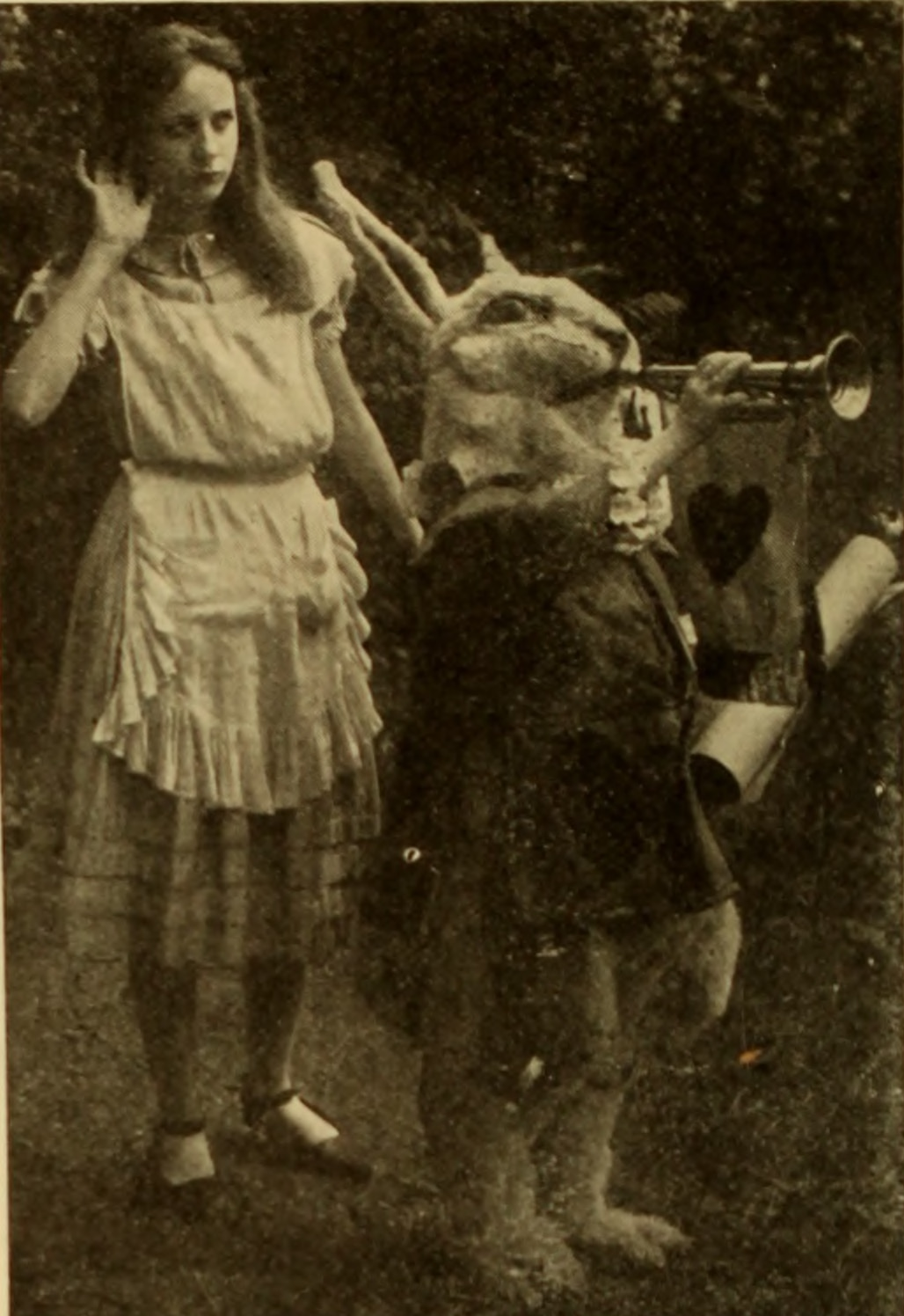
Viola Savoy (left) as Alice in Alice in Wonderland (1915)

Alice in Wonderland (1915)

Viola Savoy (born Viola Kingston Sowars; July 23, 1899–February 1987) was an American actress of the silent era remembered today for her early film interpretation of the title role in Alice in Wonderland (1915). According to a short obituary in The Moving Picture World (16 October 1915), her 39-year-old mother Lotta appeared with her in Alice in Wonderland in an uncredited role, possibly playing Alice's mother.

Savoy was born at 96 Calumet Street in Boston to Lotta Kingston and Frank L. Sowars. As a young child, she made a number of appearances on the stage, with some sources claiming she had performed in a hundred and twenty five theatre productions, ranging from Broadway to touring stock companies. Savoy said she was named after Viola in Shakespeare's Twelfth Night, a role she wished to play. By 1912 she became known for her portrayal of Virgie Cary in the stage drama The Littlest Rebel, a role later played by Shirley Temple in the 1935 film of the same name. Of her performance, the critic of the Des Moines Tribune wrote: "Viola Savoy Is a deserving favorite in the part of the Littlest Rebel, and plays with unusual insight and feeling."

Aged 15, she played Alice in the 1915 silent film Alice in Wonderland. The film's director, W. W. Young, in an introduction written for a benefit performance at Bryn Mawr College in 1915, wrote of her:

And there is delightful little Alice herself. We spent more than two months looking for just the type to portray the difficult stellar role. Several of the most popular motion picture stars, famous for their curls and girlish looks, were seriously considered, but for one reason or another would not fit. I studied the photographs of scores upon scores of motion picture and stage children of various degrees of fame and had personal interviews with many.
Finally in a theatrical manager’s office I saw a photograph of Viola Savoy and felt instinctively that my search had ended, for if in person she lived up to the promise of her photograph, there could be no doubt of her being exactly the type. Within two minutes after meeting her, and without bothering to inquire whether she had ever acted for the picture screen, she was engaged for the title role. That it was a happy choice is the unanimous verdict. She is Carroll’s Alice come to life.
Subsequently I learned that she had been acting from infancy and although only twelve years old had appeared in 128 different productions on the legitimate stage, her most recent achievement being the title role in The Littlest Rebel with William Farnum. Best of all, she knows that most effective acting is just being natural, and that is exactly the way she played Alice.

She played Clarice Van Zandt in The Spendthrift (1915). In September 1918, the New York Clipper announced that Savoy, "formerly Littlest Rebel and picture star in Alice in Wonderland", had been engaged by Forest S. Chilton for a leading part in his new seven-girl Egyptian dancing act.

== Death ==
Viola Savoy died in February 1987, aged 87.
