= The Spendthrift (1915 film) =

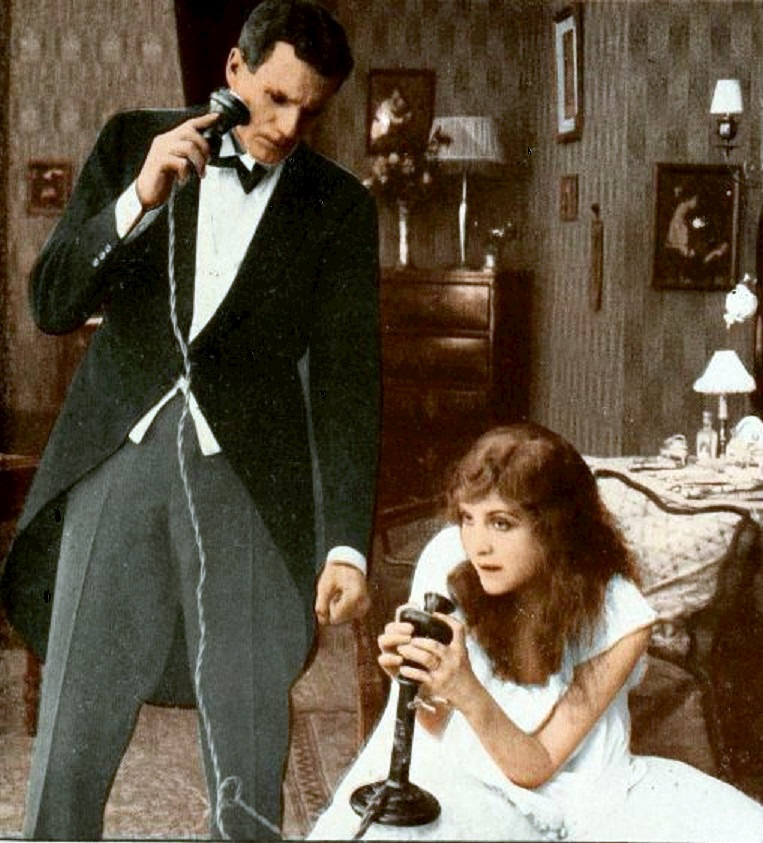
- Scene from the film
- Directed by: Walter Edwin
- Based on: play, The Spendthrift, by Porter Emerson Browne
- Produced by: George Kleine
- Starring: Irene Fenwick
- Distributed by: Kleine-Edison
- Release date: 1915
- Running time: 6 reels
- Country: United States
- Language: Silent..English titles

The Spendthrift is a 1915 silent film drama directed by Walter Edwin and starring Irene Fenwick. It is based on a 1910 Broadway play, The Spendthrift, by Porter Emerson Browne.

It is a surviving film in the Library of Congress collections.

== Cast ==
- Irene Fenwick - Frances Ward
- Cyril Keightley - Richard Ward
- Malcolm Duncan - Monty Ward
- John Nicholson - Phil Cartright
- Mattie Ferguson - Aunt Gretchen Jans
- Viola Savoy - Clarice Van Zandt
- Grace Leigh - Show Girl
- J.C. Hackett - Secretary
- Roy Pilcher - Suffern Thorne
