= Alice in Wonderland (1931 film) =

1931 film

- Directed by: Bud Pollard
- Written by: Lewis Carroll (book); John E. Goodson (adaptation); Ashley Ayer Miller (screenplay)
- Based on: Alice's Adventures in Wonderland by Lewis Carroll
- Produced by: Hugo Maienthau
- Starring: Ruth Gilbert; Leslie King; Pat Gleason; Ralph Hertz; Meyer Berensen
- Cinematography: Charles Levine
- Edited by: Bud Pollard
- Production company: Metropolitan Studios
- Distributed by: Unique Foto Films
- Release date: September 30, 1931
- Running time: 58 minutes
- Country: United States
- Language: English

Alice in Wonderland (1931) is an independently made black-and-white Pre-Code American film based on Lewis Carroll's 1865 novel Alice's Adventures in Wonderland, directed by Bud Pollard, produced by Hugo Maienthau, and filmed at Metropolitan Studios in Fort Lee, New Jersey.

This was the first sound version of the story, and therefore the first film in which Carroll's original dialogue was heard. The film stars Ruth Gilbert as Alice and Leslie King as the Mad Hatter. The film opened at the Warner Theatre in New York City. The movie begins with a jazzy theme song written by Irving Berlin.

== Plot ==
Young Alice explores the Wonderland, after falling down a rabbit hole, which soon meeting upon the White Rabbit. Alice explores Wonderland, while orchestra from the 30s plays. The music stops as the girl goes into the Duchess's House. The Duchess fights with the Cook. The Duchess greets Alice inside, and welcomes her. Alice watches a baby with the Duchess, until it turns into a pig. Alice asks the Duchess things that are none of her business. Alice screams in horror, as the Duchess tries to chop her head off. When she leaves, she meets a Cheshire Cat, who leaves his grin, behind instead. Alice meets a Mad Hatter and a March Hare at a tea party, they ask her “Why is a raven like a writing desk”, she misunderstands to answer, and leaves the tea party. Alice meets the Caterpillar, which is annoyed, and the Mock Turtle. Alice meets the Queen of Hearts, Alice finds out, that the Mad Hatter fainted. She cries sadly. The Queen of Hearts tries to chop that head, nearly. The camera zooms in on Alice, and loses her head, Alice wakes up and goes inside for tea.

== Cast ==
- Ruth Gilbert as Alice
- Leslie T. King as Mad Hatter
- Ralph Hertz as White Rabbit
- Vie Quinn as Queen of Hearts
- N.R. Cregan as King of Hearts
- Pat Glasgow as Knave of Hearts
- Mabel Wright as Duchess
- Lillian Ardell as Cook
- Tom Corliss as Cheshire Cat
- Meyer Beresen as March Hare
- Raymond Schultz as Dormouse
- Charles Silvern as Gryphan
- Gus Alexander as Mock Turtle
- Jimmy Rosen as Caterpillar

== Background ==
Publicity still from the film

This low-budget film was made in 1931 at the Metropolitan Studios in Fort Lee, New Jersey. The film's release came out one year before the centenary of the birth of Lewis Carroll, an event which was causing a wave of 'Alice' fever on both sides of the Atlantic.

In the United States, a number of 'Alice in Wonderland' plays, films, songs and puppet shows in the early 1930s attempted to cash in on this Carroll and 'Alice' fever. For example, in the Betty Boop cartoon Betty in Blunderland Betty went to Wonderland, as did Eva Le Gallienne in a 1932 Broadway adaptation that combined Alice in Wonderland with Through the Looking Glass, and which was one of the hits of the year.

Meanwhile, Paramount Pictures was preparing a big-budget Alice in Wonderland which starred an unknown, Charlotte Henry, with an all-star cast that featured W.C. Fields, Cary Grant and Gary Cooper. In 1932, Alice Liddell, the inspiration for the 'Alice' of the original books, and by now an elderly lady, visited America to take part in these centenary celebrations. There was also an 'Alice in Wonderland' dance number in Puttin' on the Ritz (1930), with Joan Bennett as Alice, and which was originally shot in Technicolor. The song and music was that by Irving Berlin featured in the 1931 release. The dance number was also issued as a separate short.

The film opened at the prestigious Warner Theatre in New York City. However, the film was not financially successful and received little critical attention.
