= Alice in Wonderland (1951 film) =

American animated film

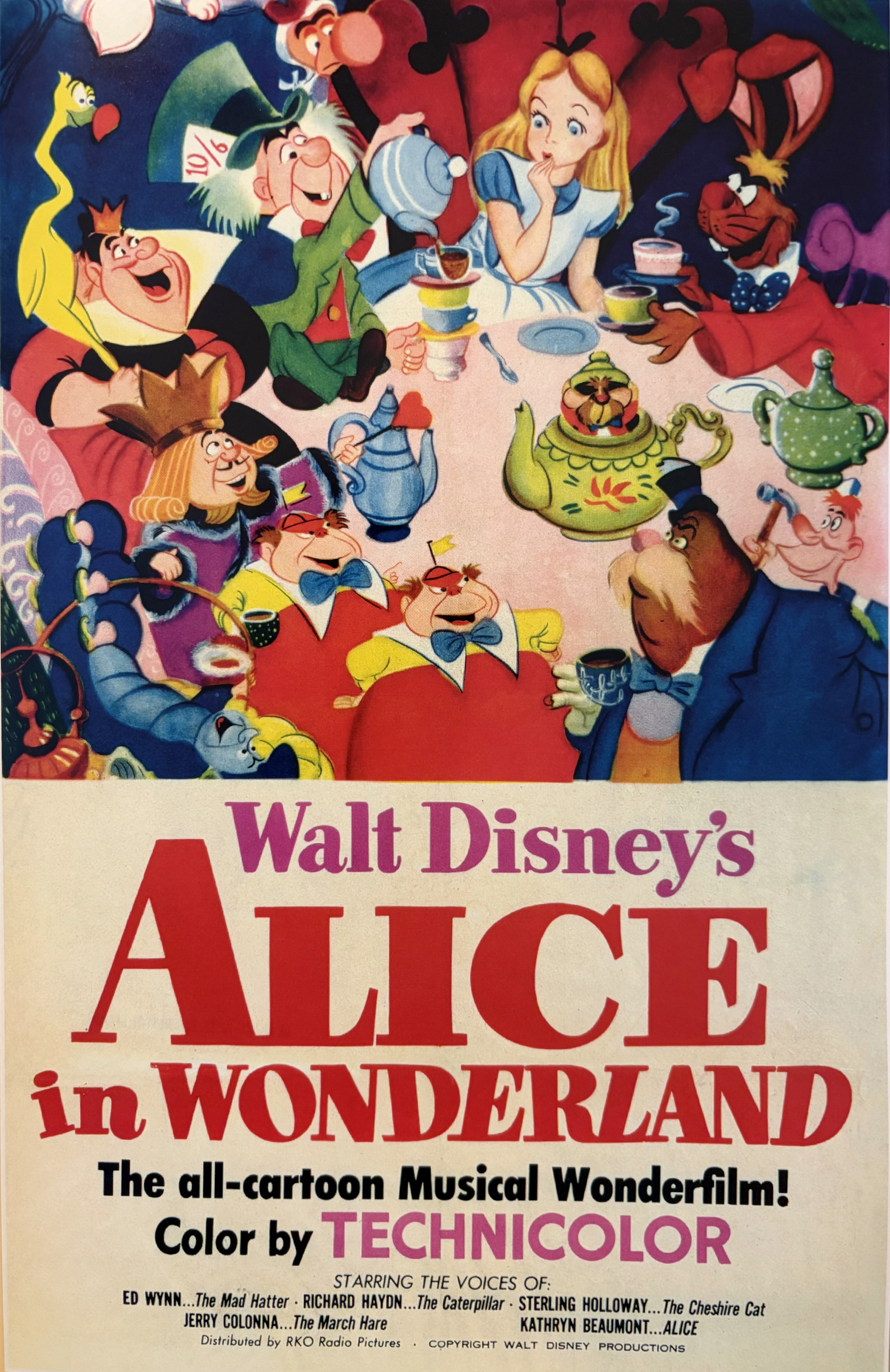
- Theatrical release poster
- Directed by: Clyde Geronimi; Wilfred Jackson; Hamilton Luske
- Story by: Winston Hibler; Ted Sears; Bill Peet; Erdman Penner; Joe Rinaldi; Milt Banta; Bill Cottrell; Dick Kelsey; Joe Grant; Dick Huemer; Del Connell; Tom Oreb; John Walbridge
- Based on: Alice's Adventures in Wonderland and Through the Looking-Glass by Lewis Carroll
- Produced by: Walt Disney
- Starring: Ed Wynn; Richard Haydn; Sterling Holloway; Jerry Colonna; Kathryn Beaumont
- Edited by: Lloyd L. Richardson
- Music by: Oliver Wallace
- Production company: Walt Disney Productions
- Distributed by: RKO Radio Pictures
- Release dates: July 26, 1951 (London); July 28, 1951 (New York City); September 14, 1951 (United States)
- Running time: 74 minutes
- Country: United States
- Language: English
- Budget: $3 million
- Box office: $2.4 million (1951, domestic); $3.5 million (1974, domestic)

Alice in Wonderland is a 1951 American animated musical fantasy comedy film produced by Walt Disney Productions and released by RKO Radio Pictures. It is based on Lewis Carroll's 1865 novel Alice's Adventures in Wonderland and its 1871 sequel Through the Looking-Glass. The production was supervised by Ben Sharpsteen, and was directed by Clyde Geronimi, Wilfred Jackson, and Hamilton Luske. With the voices of Ed Wynn, Richard Haydn, Sterling Holloway, Jerry Colonna and Kathryn Beaumont, the film follows a young girl, Alice, who falls down a rabbit hole and enters a nonsensical world, Wonderland, which is ruled by the Queen of Hearts, while encountering strange creatures, including the Mad Hatter and the Cheshire Cat.

Walt Disney was supposed to make his first film Alice which was supposed to star Mary Pickford as Alice, but he chose not to do the film and instead did Snow White and the Seven Dwarfs (1937). However, the idea was eventually revived in the 1940s, following the success of Snow White. The film was originally intended to be a live-action/animated film, but Disney decided it would be a fully animated feature film. During its production, many sequences adapted from Carroll's books were later omitted, such as Jabberwocky, the White Knight, the Duchess, Mock Turtle and the Gryphon.

Alice in Wonderland premiered at the Leicester Square Theatre in London on July 26, 1951, and was released in New York City on July 28. The film was also shown on television as one of the first episodes of Disneyland. It was a box-office failure on its first release, grossing $2.4 million domestically, and received mixed reviews from critics. However, its 1974 theatrical re-release achieved greater success, leading to additional reissues, merchandising, and home video releases as critical reception improved over time.

== Plot ==
In a park in England, a young girl named Alice listens distractedly to her sister's history lesson. As she begins daydreaming of a nonsensical world, she spots a waistcoat-wearing White Rabbit passing by, who complains of being late. Alice chases him into a burrow and plummets down a deep hole. She sees the White Rabbit disappear into a tiny door and tries to follow, but the door's talking knob advises her to alter her size using a mysterious drink and food. Alice eventually manages to shrink and passes through the door's keyhole and into Wonderland. She meets several strange characters including the Dodo and Tweedledee and Tweedledum, the latter of whom recount the tale of "The Walrus and the Carpenter".

Alice eventually finds the White Rabbit in his house, but before she can ask what he is late for, the White Rabbit mistakes her for his housemaid, and he sends her inside to fetch his gloves. She eats a cookie from a cookie box and grows into a giant again, trapping herself in the White Rabbit's house. The White Rabbit, the Dodo, and chimney sweep Bill the Lizard believe Alice to be a monster and plot to burn the house down. Alice escapes by eating a carrot from the White Rabbit's garden and shrinking down to the size of an insect. She meets and sings with some talking flowers, but they chase her away upon accusing her of being a weed. Alice is instructed by the hookah-smoking Caterpillar to eat a part of his mushroom grow back to her original size. Alice decides to keep the remaining pieces of the mushroom on hand.

Alice meets the Cheshire Cat who advises her to visit the Mad Hatter, March Hare and Dormouse. The three are hosting a mad tea party and celebrate Alice's "unbirthday", a day when it is not her birthday. The White Rabbit appears, but the March Hare and Mad Hatter destroy his pocket watch and throw him out of the party. Alice gives up on her pursuit of the White Rabbit and decides to go home, but gets lost in the Tulgey Wood. The Cheshire Cat appears and leads Alice into a giant hedge maze ruled by the tyrannical Queen of Hearts and her smaller husband, the King of Hearts. The Queen executes anyone who enrages her, and invites Alice to a bizarre croquet match using flamingoes and hedgehogs as the equipment.

The Cheshire Cat appears again and pulls a trick on the Queen which she accuses Alice of doing, and Alice is put on trial. However, Alice eats the remains of the Caterpillar's mushroom and grows to an enormous height. Tired of Wonderland, Alice openly insults the Queen by scolding for her rash behavior and calling her a "fat, pompous, bad-tempered old tyrant" until she shrinks to her normal size and is forced to flee after the Queen orders her execution. Alice becomes pursued by most of Wonderland's characters until she finally reunites with the Doorknob. The Doorknob tells her she is having a dream, forcing Alice to wake herself up. Finally, Alice and her sister head home for tea.

== Voice cast ==
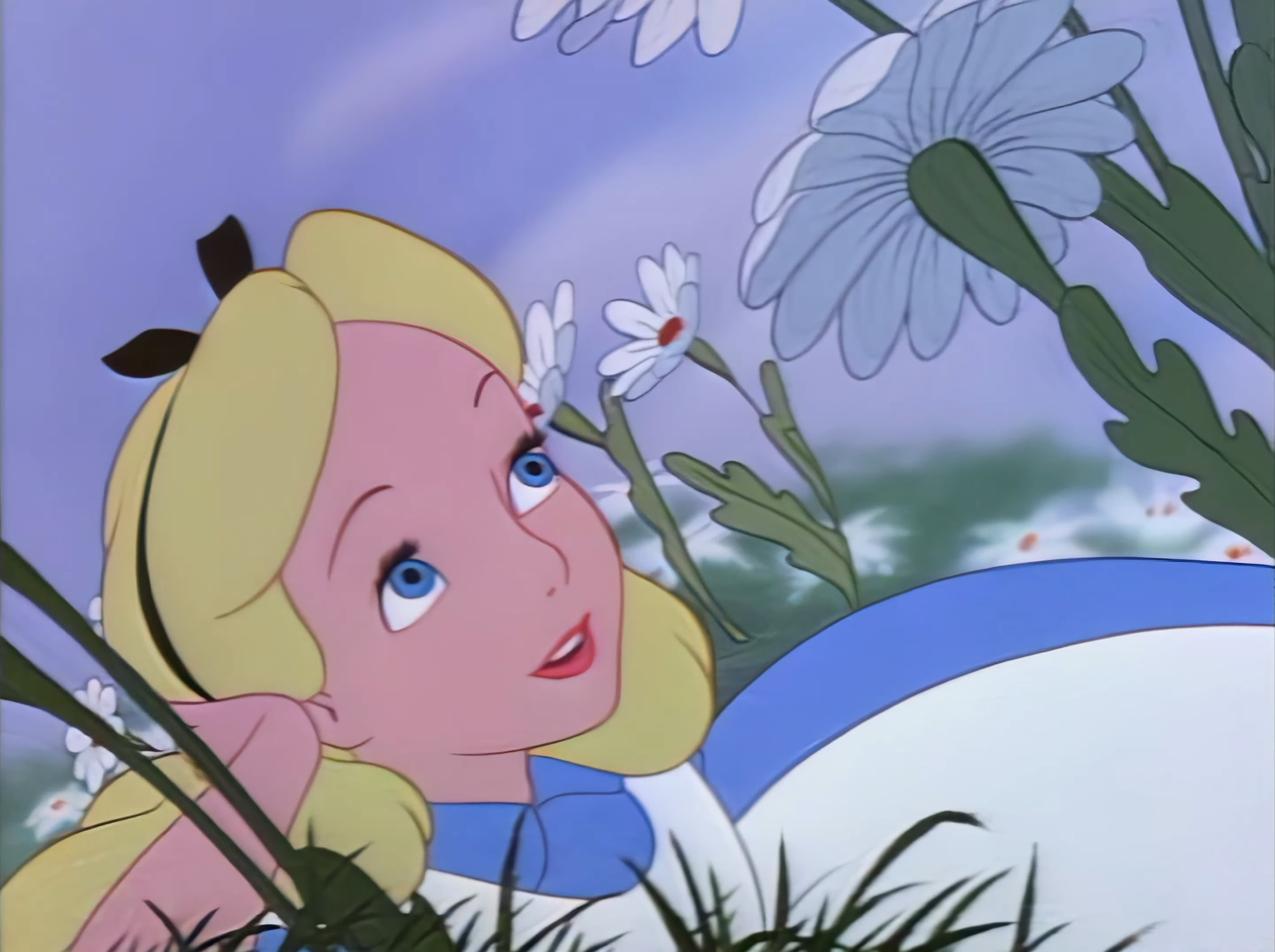
Alice as shown in the film's trailer.

- Kathryn Beaumont as Alice, a curious and imaginative little girl who gets tired of the ordinary world and dreams of living in her own nonsensical world.
- Ed Wynn as the Mad Hatter, an eccentric elderly man whom Alice encounters in Wonderland. The Hatter and his best friend, the March Hare, are known for throwing frequent tea parties in celebration of their "unbirthdays".
- Richard Haydn as the Caterpillar, a resident of Wonderland, known for smoking a hookah from which colorful smoke rises, forming letters, words, and even images that he refers to while speaking.
- Sterling Holloway as the Cheshire Cat, a mysterious, pink-and-purple-striped cat with a permanent grin. Mischievous and unpredictable in nature, the Cheshire Cat acts as a guide for Alice during her adventures in Wonderland, but also takes pleasure in causing her trouble.
- Jerry Colonna as the March Hare, a wacky, mallet-carrying hare. He is a resident of Wonderland and the best friend of the Mad Hatter, with whom the Hare regularly engages in tea and "unbirthday" parties.
- Verna Felton as the Queen of Hearts, the tyrannical and deranged ruler of Wonderland, with a sadistic penchant for beheadings. When Alice arrives in the kingdom and inadvertently humiliates the monarch, the Queen of Hearts becomes obsessed with decapitating the little girl.
- J. Pat O'Malley as Tweedledum and Tweedledee, two fat identical twin brothers dressed in schoolboy uniforms and wearing red propeller caps. They take particular delight in reciting poems and songs.
  - O'Malley also voiced the Walrus and the Carpenter, two jobless travelers whose story was told to Alice by Tweedledee and Tweedledum.
- Bill Thompson as the White Rabbit, an anthropomorphic rabbit who serves as the Queen of Hearts' herald, an obligation to which he is often late. While hurrying to work one day, the White Rabbit catches the attention of a little girl named Alice, who follows the rabbit into Wonderland to find out why he was late.
  - Thompson also voiced the Dodo, a dodo in charge of handling the Caucus Race, an event in which everyone runs at an equal pace and in a circle in an attempt to get dry.
- Heather Angel as Alice's sister
- Joseph Kearns as Doorknob, a talking doorknob with a human-like face who gives Alice advice on how to pass through a locked door.
- Larry Grey as Bill the Lizard, a small anthropomorphic lizard who works as a chimney sweep and is summoned to help remove Alice from the White Rabbit's house.
- Dink Trout as the King of Hearts, the mild-mannered, cowardly, small-statured husband of the Queen of Hearts.
- Jimmy MacDonald as the Dormouse, a sleepy dormouse who attends the Mad Hatter and March Hare's tea party.
- Clarence Nash as Dinah, Alice's red pet cat

== Directing animators ==
Directing animators are:

- Marc Davis (Alice and the eyeglasses creature)
- Milt Kahl (The Dodo, Alice, Flamingo, Hedgehog, White Rabbit)
- Eric Larson (Alice, Dinah, Caterpillar, Cheshire Cat, Queen of Hearts, Flamingo)
- Frank Thomas (Doorknob, Queen of Hearts, Wonderland Creatures)
- Ollie Johnston (Alice, King of Hearts)
- Ward Kimball (Tweedledee and Tweedledum, The Walrus and The Carpenter, Oysters, Cheshire Cat, Mad Hatter, March Hare, Dormouse)
- John Lounsbery (Flowers, Caterpillar, Cheshire Cat, Mad Hatter, March Hare, Wonderland creatures)
- Wolfgang Reitherman (White Rabbit, The Carpenter, The Dodo, Mad Hatter, March Hare)
- Les Clark (Alice, Wonderland creatures)
- Norm Ferguson (The Walrus and The Carpenter)

== Production ==
=== Early development ===
Walt Disney was familiar with Lewis Carroll's Alice books, Alice's Adventures in Wonderland (1865) and Through the Looking-Glass (1871), having read them as a schoolboy. In 1923, while working at the Laugh-O-Gram Studio in Kansas City, he produced a short film titled Alice's Wonderland, which was loosely inspired by the Alice books and featured a live-action girl (Virginia Davis) interacting with an animated world. Faced with business problems, the Laugh-O-Gram Studio went bankrupt in July of that year, and the film was never released to the general public. However, when Disney left for Hollywood, he used Alice's Wonderland to show to potential distributors. By October 1923, Margaret J. Winkler of Winkler Pictures agreed to distribute the Alice Comedies series, and Disney partnered with his older brother Roy to form the Disney Brothers Cartoon Studio, which was later re-branded Walt Disney Productions; he also re-hired his Kansas City co-workers, including Ub Iwerks, Rudolph Ising, Friz Freleng, Walker and Hugh Harman, to work on the series. Alice Comedies began in 1924 before being retired in 1927.

By June 1932, Roy Disney was first interested in acquiring the film rights to the Alice books, which, as he learned, were in the public domain. In March 1933, Mary Pickford approached Walt with a proposal for a feature-length adaptation of Alice in Wonderland, which would combine Pickford's live-action performance of the title role with an animated Wonderland supplied by the Disney studio. Disney was hesitant about the idea, and the project was quickly scrapped, after Paramount Pictures secured the film rights for their own live-action version. In 1936, Disney produced the Mickey Mouse short film Thru the Mirror, which was based on Carroll's second Alice novel, Through the Looking-Glass, featuring Mickey Mouse going through a mirror into a world where all the items in his house become alive.

David Hall created over four hundred paintings and story sketches for the 1939 version of the film.

After the enormous success of his first full-length animated feature Snow White and the Seven Dwarfs (1937), Disney acquired the film rights to the Alice books with John Tenniel's illustrations from the Macmillan Company by May 1938 (Note: David Koenig, on the other hand, indicates that Disney purchased the rights to Tenniel's illustrations as early as in 1931.) and officially registered the title with the Motion Picture Association of America. He then hired storyboard artist Al Perkins to develop the story; on September 6, 1938, Perkins compiled a detailed 161-page "analysis" of Carroll's book, which included preliminary ideas of the story treatment and summarized descriptions for each scene. On March 1, 1939, British illustrator David Hall joined the Disney studio and was immediately assigned to create the concept artwork for the film. A leica reel, featuring Hall's paintings, was completed on September 20, 1939, but Disney was not pleased; he felt that Hall's drawings resembled Tenniel's illustrations too closely, making them too difficult to animate, and that the overall tone of Perkins' script was too grotesque and dark. Disney also expressed a bit of disinterest in the project, stating, "I don't think there would be any harm in letting this thing sit for a while. Everyone is stale now. You'll look at it again and maybe have another idea on it. That's the way it works for me. I still feel that we can stick close to Alice in Wonderland and make it look like it and feel like it, you know". By February 1940, the project was still in the development, albeit slowly, with an additional story meeting held on April 2 of that year. After finishing his work on Fantasia, concept artist Gordon Legg created new inspirational sketches for the film, but eventually left the studio the following year. By the fall of 1940, the animation work on Alice in Wonderland was planned to be completed within the next two years, but Disney himself was rather unenthusiastic about the project.

Disney brought up Alice in Wonderland again at a meeting on April 8, 1941, offering to produce it as an animated film starring a live-action actress, similar to his earlier Alice Comedies series; at the same meeting, Gloria Jean was suggested for the role of Alice. In October of that year, given the box-office underperformance of Pinocchio (1940) and Fantasia (1940), as well as the World War II cutting off the foreign cinema market, Joseph Rosenberg of Bank of America issued an ultimatum, ordering Disney to restrict himself to producing animated shorts and to finish features already in production; no other feature film would begin work until they had been released and earned back their costs. In response, the production of Alice in Wonderland was heavily scaled back and eventually shelved. (Note: Steven Watts, however, indicates that Alice in Wonderland was put on hold as early as in June 1941.)

=== Return to production ===
Disney first attempted to revive Alice in Wonderland in mid-1943; new storyboards were developed throughout much of that year, but the project did not move forward. Ginger Rogers was briefly considered to portray the role of Alice on a live-action/animated feature, but she only voiced the character for a record album of the story which was released by Decca Records on October 21, 1944. In the fall of 1945, Disney hired British author Aldous Huxley to work on a live-action/animated feature, titled Alice and the Mysterious Mr. Carroll, which would revolve around Lewis Carroll and Alice Liddell (who was the inspiration for Alice). Huxley delivered a fourteen-page treatment on November 23, 1945, followed by the first draft of the script, written on December 5 of that year. He devised a story in which Carroll and Liddell were misunderstood and persecuted following the publication of Alice in Wonderland, while stage actress Ellen Terry was sympathetic to both Carroll and Liddell, and Queen Victoria served as the deus ex machina, validating Carroll due to her appreciation for the book. Disney considered child actress Margaret O'Brien for the title role, but he felt that Huxley's version was too literal an adaptation of Carroll's book. Background artist Mary Blair submitted some concept drawings for Alice in Wonderland. Blair's paintings moved away from Tenniel's detailed illustrations by taking a modernist stance, using bold and unreal colors. Walt liked Blair's designs, and the script was re-written to focus on comedy, music, and the whimsical side of Carroll's books. Lisa Davis (who later voiced Anita Radcliffe in One Hundred and One Dalmatians) and Luana Patten were also considered for the role of Alice.

However, Disney soon realized that he could only do justice to the book by making an all-animated feature and, in 1946, work began on Alice in Wonderland. With the film tentatively scheduled for release in 1950, animation crews on Alice in Wonderland and Cinderella effectively competed against each other to see which film would finish first. By early 1948, Cinderella had progressed further than Alice in Wonderland.

A legal dispute with Dallas Bower's 1949 film version was also under way. Disney sued to prevent release of the British version in the U.S., and the case was extensively covered in Time magazine. The company that released the British version accused Disney of trying to exploit their film by releasing its version at virtually the same time.

=== Writing ===
The first story meetings on Alice in Wonderland were held as early as in December 1938. Through various drafts of the script, many sequences that were present in Carroll's book drifted in and out of the story. However, Disney insisted that the scenes themselves keep close to those in the novel since most of its humor is in the writing.

One omitted scene from the 1939 treatment of the film occurred outside the Duchess' manor, where the Fish Footman is giving a message to the Frog Footman to take to the Duchess, saying that she is invited to play croquet with the Queen of Hearts. Alice overhears this and sneaks into the kitchen of the manor, where she finds the Duchess' Cook maniacally cooking and the Duchess nursing her baby. The cook is spraying pepper all over the room, causing the Duchess and Alice to sneeze and the baby to cry. After a quick conversation between Alice and the Duchess, the hot-tempered Cook starts throwing pots and pans at the noisy baby. Alice rescues the baby, but as she leaves the house the baby turns into a pig and runs away. The scene was scrapped for pacing reasons.

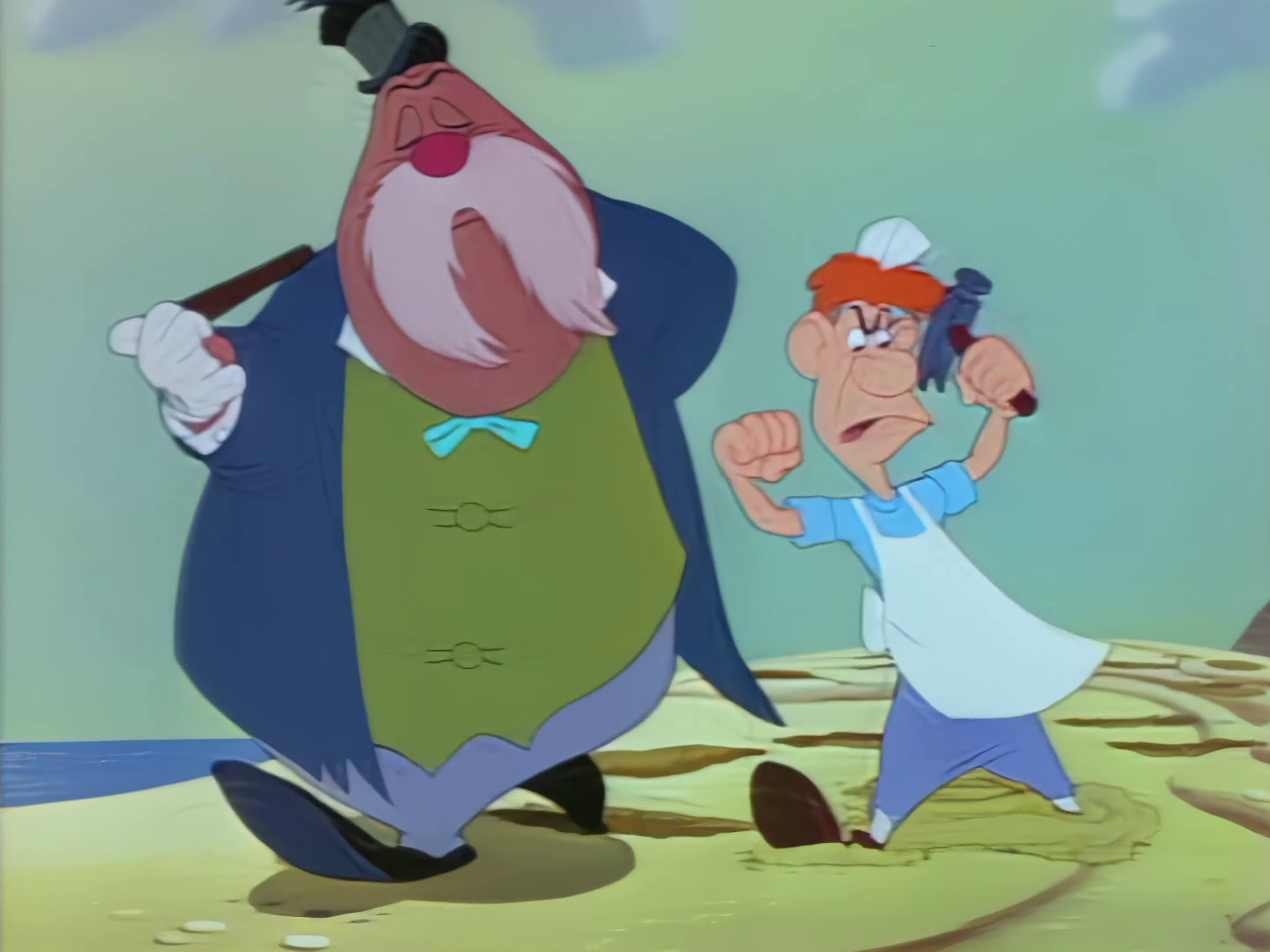
The Walrus and the Carpenter as seen in the film's trailer

Another scene that was deleted from a later draft occurred in Tulgey Wood, where Alice encountered what appeared to be a sinister-looking Jabberwock hiding in the dark, before revealing himself as a comical-looking dragon-like beast with bells and factory whistles on his head. A song, "Beware the Jabberwock", was also written, but the scene was scrapped in favor of the "Walrus and the Carpenter" poem. Out of a desire to keep the "Jabberwocky" poem in the film, it was made to replace an original song for the Cheshire Cat, "I'm Odd".

Another deleted scene in Tulgey Wood shows Alice consulting with The White Knight, who was meant to be somewhat a caricature of Walt Disney. Although Disney liked the scene, he felt it was better if Alice learned her lesson by herself, hence the song "Very Good Advice". The Trial scene at the end of the film was edited with Alice being accused of teasing the Queen during a game of croquet rather than the Knave of Hearts being accused for stealing tarts the Queen made.

Other characters, such as Mock Turtle and the Gryphon were discarded for pacing reasons, though they would later appear alongside Alice in some commercials.

== Music ==
Alice in Wonderland

Studio album by Oliver Wallace
- Released: 1951
- Label: Disneyland Records

In an effort to retain some of Carroll's imaginative poems, Disney commissioned top songwriters to compose songs built around them for use in the film. Over 30 potential songs were written, and many of them were included in the film—some for only a few seconds—the greatest number of songs of any Disney film. In 1939, Frank Churchill was assigned to compose songs, and they were accompanied by a story reel featuring artwork from David S. Hall. Although none of his songs were used in the finished film, the melody for "Lobster Quadrille" was used for the song "Never Smile at a Crocodile" in Peter Pan which came out two years after the film's release. When work on Alice resumed in 1946, Tin Pan Alley songwriters Mack David, Al Hoffman and Jerry Livingston began composing songs for it after working on Cinderella. However, the only song by the trio that made it into the film was "The Unbirthday Song".

While he was composing songs in New York, Sammy Fain had heard that the Disney studios wanted him to compose songs for Alice in Wonderland. He also suggested lyricist Bob Hilliard as his collaborator. The two wrote two unused songs for the film, "Beyond the Laughing Sky" and "I'm Odd". The music for the former song was kept but the lyrics were changed, and it later became the title song for Peter Pan, "The Second Star to the Right". By April 1950, Fain and Hilliard had finished composing songs for the film.

The title song, composed by Sammy Fain, has become a jazz standard, adapted by jazz pianist Dave Brubeck in 1952 and included on his 1957 Columbia album Dave Digs Disney. Another notable jazz version is by Bill Evans on his classic 1961 album, Sunday at the Village Vanguard. The song, "In a World of My Own", is included on the orange disc of Classic Disney: 60 Years of Musical Magic.

=== Soundtrack and Camarata version ===
There was no soundtrack album available when the film was released in 1951. RCA Victor released a story album and single records with Kathryn Beaumont and several cast members that re-created the story, but it was not the soundtrack. In 1944, Decca Records had released a Ginger Rogers dramatization of Lewis Carroll's book with Disney cover art (perhaps tying in with earlier discussions of her being cast as a live-action Disney "Alice"), Decca did indeed license the rights to release the 1951 Alice soundtrack from Disney, but later decided against it and never produced one. When Disney started its own record company, Disneyland Records, in Spring 1956, it was found to be economically unfeasible at the time to take on the fees and other costs to produce a soundtrack album.

In 1957, Tutti Camarata arranged and conducted an elaborate original production of the Alice score with Darlene Gillespie, who had shown great promise among the Mickey Mouse Club cast as a singer. Camarata assembled a new orchestra and chorus (possibly with the cooperation of Norman Luboff, as Betty Mulliner (Luboff) and choir member Thurl Ravenscroft can be heard) in the Capitol studios in Hollywood. The resulting album became one of the most influential and acclaimed studio versions of a score, garnering praise from within the industry as well as the public. The original issue (WDL-4025), depicting Alice seated in a tree with characters beneath her, is highly collectible. The album was so popular it was reissued in 1959, 1963 and 1968 with different covers, including story albums with books and single records, all featuring music from this album, as well as translated versions of the Camarata Alice music for international recordings.

Selections from this album are still heard in the queue for the Alice In Wonderland dark ride at Disneyland in California and during the Storybook Land Canal Boats ride. Tokyo Disneyland incorporated musical arrangements from the Camarata version for live shows and CD releases.

To date, the only soundtrack material ever made available on vinyl records was released outside the United States. In the late nineties, over 45 years after the film's original release, a soundtrack album of Alice in Wonderland was finally released in the U.S. on Audio CD by Walt Disney Records.

=== Songs ===
Original songs performed in the film include:

No.	Title	Writer(s)	Performer(s)	Length
1.	"Alice in Wonderland"	Sammy Fain & Bob Hilliard	The Jud Conlon Chorus
2.	"In a World of My Own"	Fain & Hilliard	Kathryn Beaumont
3.	"I'm Late"	Fain & Hilliard	Bill Thompson
4.	"The Sailor's Hornpipe"	Traditional	Bill Thompson
5.	"The Caucus Race"	Fain & Hilliard	Bill Thompson & The Jud Conlon Chorus
6.	"How Do You Do and Shake Hands?"	Oliver Wallace & Cy Coben	J. Pat O'Malley
7.	"The Walrus and the Carpenter"	Fain & Hilliard	J. Pat O'Malley
8.	"Old Father William"	Oliver Wallace & Ted Sears	J. Pat O'Malley
9.	"We'll Smoke the Blighter Out"	Wallace & Sears	Bill Thompson
10.	"All in the Golden Afternoon"	Fain & Hilliard	Kathryn Beaumont & Chorus
11.	"A-E-I-O-U (The Caterpillar Song)"	Wallace & Sears	Richard Haydn
12.	"'Twas Brillig"	Don Raye & Gene de Paul	Sterling Holloway
13.	"The Unbirthday Song"	Mack David, Al Hoffman, & Jerry Livingston	Kathryn Beaumont, Ed Wynn & Jerry Colonna
14.	"Very Good Advice"	Fain & Hilliard	Kathryn Beaumont
15.	"Painting the Roses Red"	Fain & Hilliard	Kathryn Beaumont & The Mellomen
16.	"Who's Been Painting My Roses Red?"	Fain & Hilliard	Verna Felton

Songs written for the film but deleted during production include:

- "Beyond the Laughing Sky" – Alice (replaced by "In a World of My Own"; this melody was later used for "The Second Star to the Right" in Peter Pan)
- "Dream Caravan" – Caterpillar (replaced by "A-E-I-O-U")
- "Everything Has a Useness" – Caterpillar
- "I'm Odd" – Cheshire Cat (replaced by "'Twas Brillig")
- "So They Say" – Alice
- "When the Wind is in the East" - Mad Hatter
- "Gavotte of the Cards" - Alice
- "Entrance of the Executioner" - King of Hearts and Queen of Hearts
- "Beware the Jabberwock" – Stan Freberg, Daws Butler and the Rhythmaires (referring to the deleted character)
- "If You'll Believe in Me" – The Lion and The Unicorn (deleted characters)
- "Beautiful Soup" – The Mock Turtle and The Gryphon (deleted characters) set to the tune of The Blue Danube
- "The Lobster Quadrille (Will You Join the Dance?)" - The Mock Turtle (deleted character)
- "Speak Roughly to Your Little Boy" – The Duchess (deleted character)
- "Humpty Dumpty" – Humpty Dumpty (deleted character)

== Release ==
Alice in Wonderland's world premiere took place at the Leicester Square Theatre in London on July 26, 1951. During the film's initial theatrical run, the film was released as a double feature with the True-Life Adventures documentary short, Nature's Half Acre. Following the film's initial lukewarm reception, it was never re-released theatrically in Disney's lifetime, instead being shown occasionally on television. Alice in Wonderland aired as the second episode of the Walt Disney's Disneyland television series on ABC on November 3, 1954, in a severely edited version cut down to less than an hour.

Beginning in 1971, the film was screened in several sold-out venues at college campuses, becoming the most rented film in some cities. Then, in 1974, Disney gave Alice in Wonderland its first theatrical re-release. The company even promoted it as a film in tune with the "psychedelic times", using radio commercials featuring allusions to the song "White Rabbit" performed by Jefferson Airplane. This release was so successful that it warranted a subsequent re-release in 1981. It was re-released in the UK on December 22, 1969 and on July 26, 1979.

=== Marketing ===
Disney sought to use the new medium of television to help advertise Alice in Wonderland. In March 1950, he spoke to his brother Roy about launching a television program featuring the studio's animated shorts. Roy agreed, and later that summer they spoke to the Coca-Cola Company about sponsoring an hour-long Christmas broadcast featuring Disney hosting several cartoons and a scene from the upcoming film. The program became One Hour in Wonderland, which was aired on NBC on Christmas Day 1950. At the same time, a ten-minute featurette about the making of the film, Operation: Wonderland, was produced and screened in theaters and on television stations. Additionally, Disney, Kathryn Beaumont, and Sterling Holloway appeared on The Fred Waring Show on March 18, 1951, to promote the film.

=== Home media ===
Alice in Wonderland was one of the first titles available for the rental market on VHS and Beta and for retail sale on RCA's short-lived CED Videodisc format. The film was released on October 15, 1981, on VHS, CED Videodisc, and Betamax for its 30th anniversary. Five years later, it was re-issued in the "Wonderland Sale" promotion on May 28, 1986 on VHS, Betamax, and LaserDisc for its 35th anniversary. It was then re-promoted on July 12, 1991 for its 40th anniversary, surrounding the video re-issue of Robin Hood. The film would later receive a third release on VHS and LaserDisc as part of the Walt Disney Masterpiece Collection on October 28, 1994, with the VHS cassette of the film being re-released multiple times: from March 3, 1995 to July 13, 1999.

In January 2000, Walt Disney Home Video launched the Gold Classic Collection, and then Alice in Wonderland was re-issued on VHS and DVD in the line on July 4, 2000. The DVD contained the Operation: Wonderland featurette, several sing-a-long videos, a storybook, a trivia game, and its theatrical trailer.

A fully restored two-disc "Masterpiece Edition" DVD was released on January 27, 2004, including the full hour-long episode of the Disney television show with Kathryn Beaumont, Edgar Bergen, Charlie McCarthy and Mortimer Snerd, Bobby Driscoll and others that promoted the film, computer games, deleted scenes, songs and related materials, and went into moratorium in January 2009. A year and two months later, Disney released a 2-disc special "Un-Anniversary" edition DVD on March 30, 2010 to promote the recent Tim Burton version. The film was released in a Blu-ray and DVD set on February 1, 2011, to celebrate its 60th anniversary, featuring a new HD restoration of the film and many bonus features. Disney re-released the film on Blu-ray and DVD on April 26, 2016, to celebrate the film's 65th anniversary (a reprint of the anniversary release from five years earlier).

The film was released on Disney+ on November 12, 2019.

On May 5, 2026, a 4K Ultra HD Blu-ray was released to celebrate the film's 75th anniversary with a restoration from a team that spent nine months completing a digital scan of the original nitrate successive exposure negatives, followed by extensive clean-up to address dust, warping, and age-related wear. Walt Disney Animation Research Library collaborated with Walt Disney Animation Studios veteran Michael Giaimo to ensure the restoration remained true to the filmmakers' original intent while reviewing every shot and refining color and luminance.

== Reception ==
=== Box office ===
During its initial theatrical run, the film grossed $2.4 million in domestic rentals. Because of the film's production budget of $3 million, the studio wrote off a million-dollar loss. During its theatrical re-release in 1974, the film grossed $3.5 million in domestic rentals.

=== Critical reaction ===
Initial reviews for Alice in Wonderland were mixed, with particularly strong criticism coming from the British press. Bosley Crowther, reviewing for The New York Times, complimented that "...if you are not too particular about the images of Carroll and Tenniel, if you are high on Disney whimsey and if you'll take a somewhat slow, uneven pace, you should find this picture entertaining. Especially should it be for the kids, who are not so demanding of fidelity as are their moms and dads. A few of the episodes are dandy, such as the mad tea party and the caucus race; the music is tuneful and sugary and the color is excellent." Variety wrote that the film "has an earnest charm and a chimerical beauty that best shows off the Carroll fantasy. However, it has not been able to add any real heart or warmth, ingredients missing from the two tomes and which have always been an integral part of the previous Disney feature cartoons."

Mae Tinee of the Chicago Tribune wrote that "While the Disney figures do resemble John Tenniel's famous sketches, they abound in energy but are utterly lacking in enchantment, and seem more closely related to Pluto, the clumsy pup, than the products of Carroll's imagination. Youngsters probably will find it a likable cartoon, full of lively characters, with Alice's dream bedecked with just a touch of nightmare—those who cherish the old story as I have probably will be distinctly disappointed." Time stated that, "Judged simply as the latest in the long, popular line of Disney cartoons, Alice lacks a developed story line, which the studio's continuity experts, for all their freedom with scissors and paste, have been unable to put together out of the episodic books. Much of it is familiar stuff; Carroll's garden of live flowers prompts Disney to revive the style of his Silly Symphonies. Yet there is plenty to delight youngsters, and there are flashes of cartooning ingenuity that should appeal to grownups." Writing for /Film, Miyako Pleines says "Unlike the other Disney princesses before her, Alice seemed to have no real purpose (even if that purpose is simply to be a damsel in distress). People saw her as lacking ambition and drive, a lazy girl who daydreamed during her studies and wandered into a magical world."

Alice in Wonderland was met with great criticism from Carroll fans, as well as from British film and literary critics, who accused Disney of "Americanizing" a great work of English literature. Walt Disney was not surprised by the critical reception to Alice in Wonderland as his version of Alice was intended for large family audiences, not literary critics. Additionally, the film was met with a lukewarm response at the box office. Additionally, he remarked that the film failed because it lacked heart. In The Disney Films, Leonard Maltin says that animator Ward Kimball felt the film failed because "it suffered from too many cooks—directors. Here was a case of five directors each trying to top the other guy and make his sequence the biggest and craziest in the show. This had a self-canceling effect on the final product." Animators Frank Thomas and Ollie Johnston also considered the film a failure and stated on their website that they felt "none of us could fully capture the characters of Lewis Carrol's imagination."

/Film reported that the film is "now considered to be a beloved Disney classic." On the film aggregator website Rotten Tomatoes, Alice in Wonderland received an approval rating of 82% from 79 critical reviews with an average rating of 6.9/10. The consensus states, "A good introduction to Lewis Carroll's classic, Alice in Wonderland boasts some of the Disney canon's most surreal and twisted images." Another film review aggregator, Metacritic, which assigns a rating out of 100 based on top reviews from mainstream critics, calculated a score of 68 based on 10 reviews, indicating "generally favorable" reviews.

=== Accolades ===
Award	Category	Nominee(s)	Result
Academy Awards	Best Scoring of a Musical Picture	Oliver Wallace	Nominated
Venice International Film Festival	Golden Lion	Clyde Geronimi, Wilfred Jackson and Hamilton Luske	Nominated

== Legacy ==
=== Stage version ===
Alice in Wonderland has been condensed into a one-act stage version entitled, Alice in Wonderland, Jr. The stage version is solely meant for middle and high school productions and includes the majority of the film's songs and others including Song of the South's "Zip-a-Dee-Doo-Dah", two new reprises of "I'm Late!", and three new numbers entitled "Ocean of Tears", "Simon Says", and "Who Are You?" respectively. This 60–80 minute version is licensed by Music Theatre International in the Broadway, Jr. Collection along with other Disney Theatrical shows such as Disney's Aladdin, Jr., Disney's Mulan, Jr., Beauty and the Beast, Disney's High School Musical: On Stage!, Elton John and Tim Rice's Aida, and many more. It was not available to license from 2018 to 2023, but is available again, now with some new songs from the 2010 film Alice in Wonderland, as of 2024.

=== References in other media ===
- In Donald in Mathmagic Land, Donald Duck wears Alice's dress and has her hairstyle, except it's brown and not blond. A larger pencil bird is in the film as well.
- Bill the Lizard appears as one of Professor Ratigan's henchmen in The Great Mouse Detective.
- Alice and several other characters from the film were featured as guests in House of Mouse, and the Queen of Hearts was one of the villains featured in Mickey's House of Villains. The Mad Hatter was also featured in Mickey's Magical Christmas: Snowed in at the House of Mouse.
- The Mad Hatter and the March Hare were also featured in several episodes of Bonkers.
- Bill the Lizard, Tweedledum, Cheshire Cat and the doorknob also appear in the 1988 Disney film Who Framed Roger Rabbit.
- In the opening of Aladdin, the peddler tries to sell a hookah much like the one the Caterpillar used.
- In Aladdin and the King of Thieves, the Genie turns into the White Rabbit.
- Weebo shows clips of the film on her screen in Flubber.
- An episode of Mickey Mouse Clubhouse, entitled "Mickey's Adventures in Wonderland", is based on the film.
- During the song "When You Wish Upon a Star" in Disney's Pinocchio, the Alice in Wonderland book can be seen on the bookshelf where Jiminy Cricket is singing from. This reference can be considered indirect as the film was released 11 years prior to Alice in Wonderland.
- Alice and Cheshire Cat made cameo appearances in episodes of The Wonderful World of Mickey Mouse.
- Like other Walt Disney Animation Studios characters, the characters from Alice in Wonderland have cameo appearances in the short film Once Upon a Studio (2023).

=== Spin-off ===
An undetermined animated project focused on the Cheshire Cat was in development for Disney's subscription video on-demand streaming service Disney+ since 2019.

In 2022, a CGI-animated TV series called Alice's Wonderland Bakery was released on Disney Junior. The series centers on Alice, the great-granddaughter of the original heroine.

=== Theme parks ===
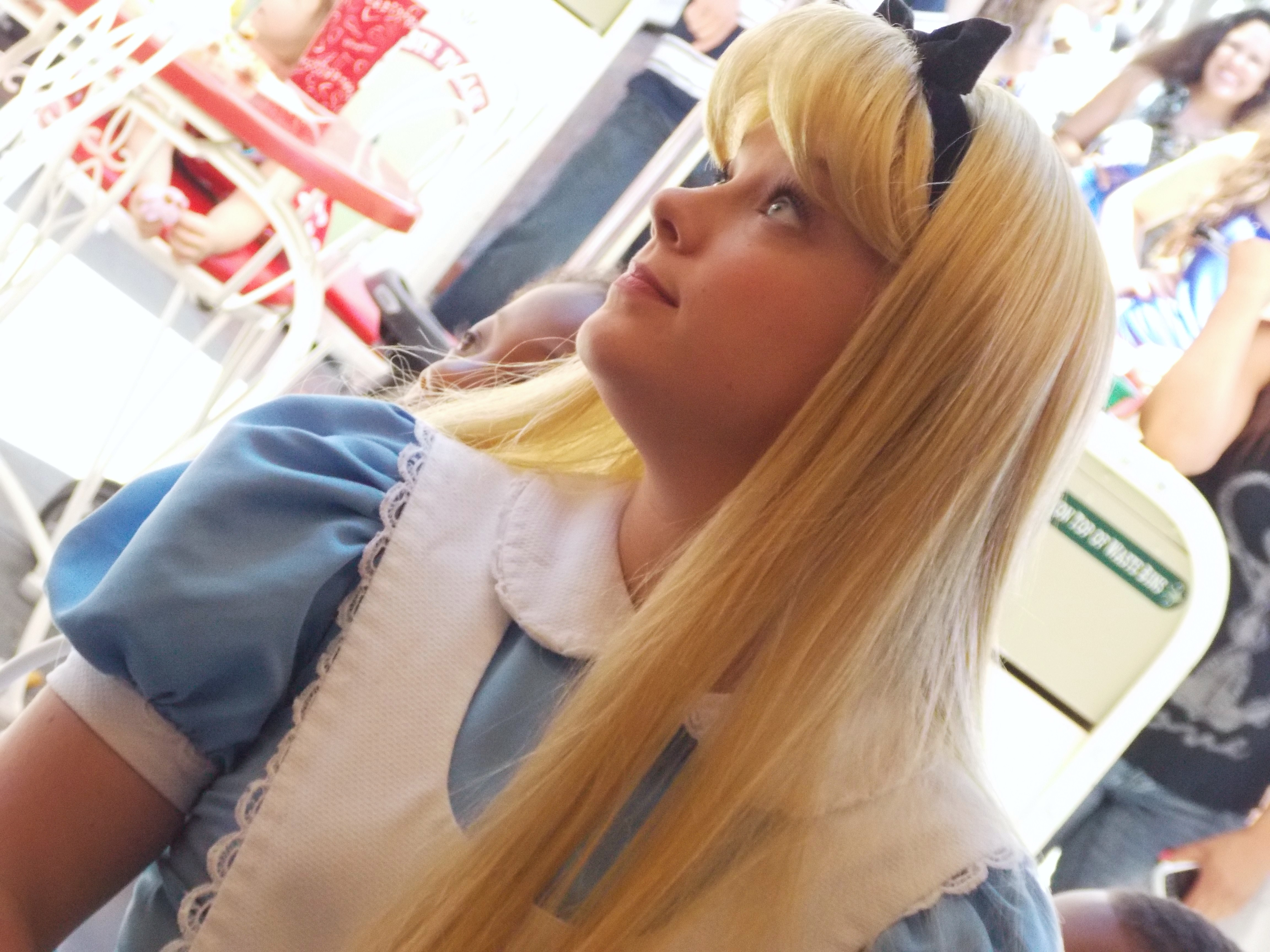
Alice at Disneyland, 2012.

Costumed versions of Alice, The Mad Hatter, The White Rabbit, The Queen of Hearts, Tweedledum, and Tweedledee make regular appearances at the Disney theme parks and resorts, and other characters from the film (including the Walrus and the March Hare) have featured in the theme parks, although quite rarely. Disneyland features a ride-through visit to Wonderland on board a Caterpillar-shaped ride vehicle; this adventure is unique to Disneyland and has not been reproduced at Disney's other parks. More famously, five of the six Disneyland-style theme parks feature Mad Tea Party, a teacups ride based on Disney's adaptation of Alice in Wonderland. The Disneyland and Tokyo Disneyland versions of It's a Small World also featured Alice and White Rabbit in the England scene since 2009 (in Disneyland) and 2018 (in Tokyo Disneyland).

Alice in Wonderland is also frequently featured in many parades and shows in the Disney Theme Parks, including The Main Street Electrical Parade, SpectroMagic, Fantasmic!, Dreamlights, The Move It! Shake It! Celebrate It! Street Party and Walt Disney's Parade of Dreams. Tokyo Disneyland presented several live productions, including Alice's Wonderland Party and Alice's Wonderland Tales. Disneyland Park features the world's only dark ride based on the film in addition to the Mad Tea Party teacup ride, and Disneyland Paris also contains a hedge maze called Alice's Curious Labyrinth, which takes its inspiration from the film. The now-defunct Mickey Mouse Revue, shown at Walt Disney World and later at Tokyo Disneyland, contained characters and scenes from the film.

On 25 May 2024, a limited-run stage show Alice and the Queen of Hearts: Back to Wonderland opened in the Theater of the Stars in Walt Disney Studios Park at Disneyland Paris. It will be presented until 29 September 2024.

=== Video games ===
In Disney's Villains' Revenge, the Queen of Hearts is one of the villains who tries to turn the ending to her story to where she finally cuts off Alice's head.

Mickey Mousecapade features various characters from the film. The Japanese version, in fact, is based very heavily on the film, with almost every reference in the game coming from the film.

A video game version of the film was released on Game Boy Color by Nintendo of America on October 4, 2000, in North America.

The Kingdom Hearts video game series includes Wonderland as a playable world in the titles Kingdom Hearts, Chain of Memories, 358/2 Days, Coded, and Kingdom Hearts χ. In the games, Alice is one of seven "Princesses of Heart", a group of maidens who are a major part of the plot in the series. Other characters from the film that appear in the games include the Queen of Hearts and the Card Soldiers (also enemies in the games), Cheshire Cat, White Rabbit, Doorknob, Mad Hatter, March Hare, Tweedle Dee and Tweedle Dum, and the Caterpillar (this last in the non-official Kingdom Hearts V Cast game only).

In Toy Story 3: The Video Game, the Mad Hatter's hat is one of the hats you can have the townsfolk wear.

In Kinect Disneyland Adventures, Alice, the Mad Hatter, the White Rabbit, and the Queen of Hearts make appearances, while the Caterpillar, the Cheshire Cat and the March Hare only appear in specific sections of the Alice in Wonderland attraction located in Fantasyland. The player can also acquire either Alice's blue dress and white pinafore apron or the Mad Hatter's olive green hat and mustard tailcoat with a blue bow tie as costumes to wear (depending on the avatar's gender) in several different stores located around the park.

In Disney Infinity, there are Power Discs based on Alice in Wonderland.

Several characters of the movie make appearances throughout the Epic Mickey-games. For example, the cards are seen throughout Mickeyjunk Mountain in the original Epic Mickey, Alice appears as a statue carrying a projector screen in Epic Mickey 2 and Alice, the Mad Hatter, and the Cheshire Cat appear as unlockable characters in Epic Mickey: Power of Illusion.

Alice, the White Rabbit, the Mad Hatter, the March Hare, the Cheshire Cat, the Queen of Hearts and the Caterpillar appear as playable characters in Disney Magic Kingdoms, along with some attractions based on locations of the film or real attractions from Disney Parks, as content to unlock for a limited time.

In Disney Mirrorverse Alice is playable.

== See also ==
- Alice in Wonderland (2010), a live-action film adaptation of Carroll's works and a re-imagining of the story directed by Tim Burton. A sequel to the film, Alice Through the Looking Glass, directed by James Bobin, was released in 2016.

== Bibliography ==
- Allan, Robin (1999). Walt Disney and Europe: European Influence on the Animated Feature Films of Walt Disney. John Libbey & Co. ISBN 978-1-8646-2041-2.
- Barrier, Michael (1999). Hollywood Cartoons: American Animation in Its Golden Age. Oxford University Press. ISBN 978-0-19-802079-0.
- Barrier, Michael (2007). The Animated Man: A Life of Walt Disney. University of California Press. ISBN 978-0-5202-5619-4.
- Bloom, Harold (2003). Aldous Huxley. Chelsea House. ISBN 978-0-7910-7040-6.
- Gabler, Neal (2006). Walt Disney: The Triumph of the American Imagination. Vintage Books. ISBN 978-0-6797-5747-4.
- Ghez, Didier (2016). They Drew As they Pleased: The Hidden Art of Disney's Musical Years (The 1940s - Part One). Chronicle Books LLC. ISBN 978-1-4521-3744-5.
- Koenig, David (1997). Mouse Under Glass: Secrets of Disney Animation & Theme Parks. Bonaventure Press. ISBN 978-0-9640-6051-7.
- Watts, Steven (2001). The Magic Kingdom: Walt Disney and the American Way of Life. University of Missouri Press. ISBN 978-0-8262-1379-2.
