= Ruth Gilbert (actress) =

American actress

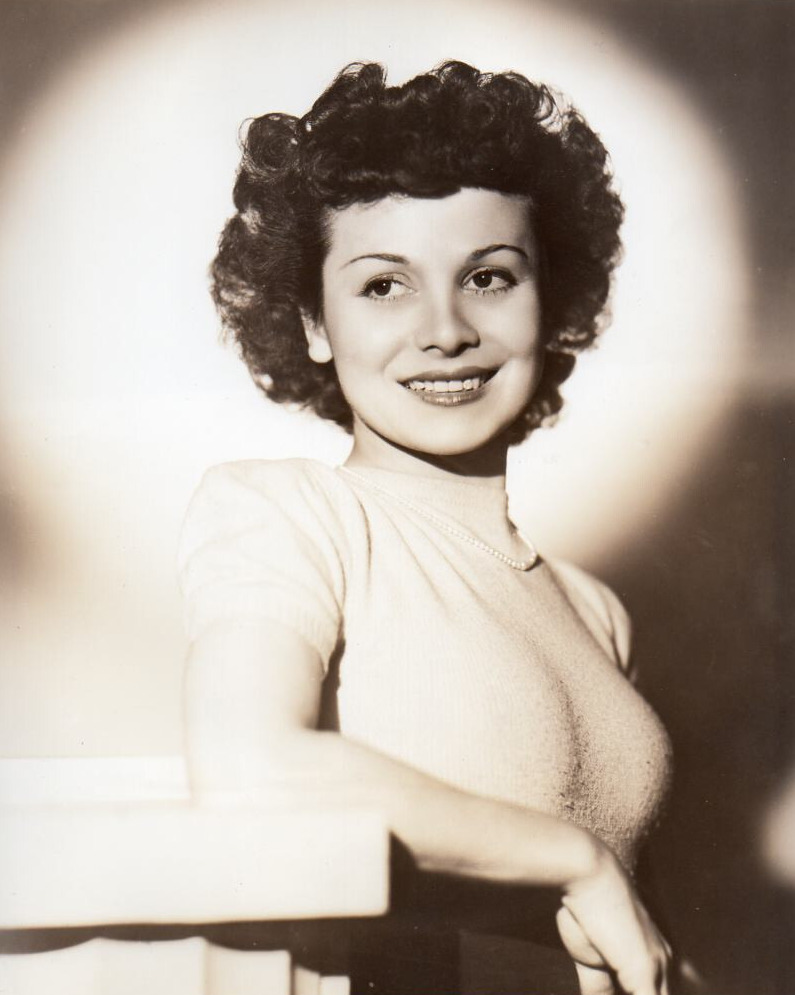
- Gilbert in 1942
- Born: May 8, 1912; New York City, U.S.
- Died: October 12, 1993 (aged 81); New York City, U.S.
- Occupation: Actress

Ruth Gilbert (May 8, 1912 – October 12, 1993) was an American actress, best known for her role as Alice in the first sound version of Alice in Wonderland in 1931, and as Max in The Milton Berle Show.

== Career ==
A graduate of the American Academy of Dramatic Arts, Gilbert's role as Alice in the 1931 film Alice in Wonderland was her first major role. The film was made by Metropolitan Studios, an independent film company from Fort Lee, New Jersey. They made it for educational purposes in readiness for the 100th anniversary of Lewis Carroll's birth the following year

Gilbert's success in Alice in Wonderland gained her national recognition and this led to her first Broadway role in Girls in Uniform in 1932, a play inspired by the German film Mädchen in Uniform, which was in turn based upon the Christa Winsloe novel and play. Her role as Alice also got Gilbert noticed by Eugene O'Neill who cast her in the role of Muriel in the Theatre Guild production of Ah, Wilderness!, which also starred George M. Cohan.

She continued to work steadily on Broadway and as a radio actress throughout the 1930s and 1940s. During this period, she appeared as Sadie in John Howard Lawson's Processional at the Federal Theatre Project in 1937. She was also a member of the Group Theatre for two years, and in 1946 O'Neill cast her as Pearl in his play The Iceman Cometh. On radio, she appeared in Norman Corwin's Columbia Presents Corwin.

In 1949, Gilbert replaced Lee Grant as the shoplifter in the Broadway run of Detective Story. That same year, she also appeared in the NBC Presents episode entitled, "The Florist Shop", and she became the star of her own short lived TV series, Ruthie on the Telephone, which co-starred Phillip Reed. The latter series was notable in that it was a prime time show in which each episode was only five minutes long.

Gilbert continued to work well into the 1950s. From 1953 to 1955, she played Max, the lovesick, scatterbrained secretary, in ten episodes of The Milton Berle Show. Her often repeated line in the show, "Let's not fight this, Mil-l-ton, it's bigger than both of us," became her catchphrase However, midway through her tenure on the show, she was fired for becoming pregnant. Nevertheless, the matter was ultimately resolved by arbitration and she returned to the program after the birth of her daughter.

Gilbert's career reached its zenith in the 1950s and thereafter began to slow down. However, a year before her death, she made one last comeback in a cameo as Mrs. Landesman in the film Me, Myself and I in 1992.

== Death ==
Gilbert died on October 12, 1993, at a hospice in Calvary Hospital in the Bronx, Manhattan of brain cancer. Her death was mistakenly originally reported as happening on October 13, 1993, at the Memorial Sloan-Kettering Cancer Center.
