= Geddes (surname) =

Geddes (UK: /ˈɡɛdɪs/ GHED-iss, US: /ˈɡɛdiːz/ GHED-eez) is a surname of English and Scottish origin. In Scotland and Northern Ireland, the name may be derived from the place-name Geddes in Nairn, Scotland. The Dictionary of American Family Names claims that the surname is more likely a patronymic name derived from Geddie, perhaps an altered form of MacAdam. In this way, the letter G represents the Scottish Gaelic mac, "son of," and Eddie is a variant of Adam. Geddie may also be a nickname meaning "greedy," derived from gedd, meaning "pike," which could also refer to a voracious eater. The earliest written record of the surname Geddes is of William Ged, from Shropshire, England, recorded within the Pipe Rolls in 1230. The surname Geddes can be represented in Scottish Gaelic as Geadasach and Geadais.

It has also been suggested that Geddes (Geadais in Scottish Gaelic) is an earlier Gaelic spelling for Cádiz, an ancient and important seaport in southern Spain (Latin Gādēs). This proposal for the origin of the surname Geddes is based on several lines of evidence connecting people and place names in Scotland with Jewish trading routes to France and Spain.

== Surname ==
- Alasdair Macintosh Geddes (1934–2024), Scottish medical doctor and scientist who diagnosed the world's last reported fatality due to smallpox
- Albert Geddes (1871–1935), New Zealand cricketer
- Andrew Geddes (1783–1844), Scottish painter
- Andrew James Wray Geddes (1906–1988), British Air Commodore responsible for the planning of Operation Manna
- Andy Geddes (1959–2022), Scottish footballer
- Anna Geddes (1857–1917), British social environmental activist
- Anne Geddes (born 1956), Australian-born photographer
- Alexander Geddes (1737–1802), Scottish theologian and scholar
- Auckland Geddes, 1st Baron Geddes (1879–1954), British politician and diplomat
- Barbara Geddes (born 1944), American academic
- Barbara Bel Geddes (1922–2005), American actress
- Bobby Geddes (born 1960), Scottish footballer
- Charles Geddes, Baron Geddes of Epsom (1897–1963), British entrepreneur and life peer
- Eric Campbell Geddes (1875–1937), British politician and First Lord of the Admiralty during WWI
- Euan Geddes, 3rd Baron Geddes, current Lord Geddes and Deputy Speaker of the House of Lords
- George Geddes (engineer) (1809–1883), engineer, agricultural expert, and New York state senator
- George W. Geddes (1824–1892), American politician, U.S. Representative from Ohio
- James Geddes (engineer) (1763–1838), American engineer and surveyor
- James Lorraine Geddes (1827–1887), American soldier and writer
- Jane Geddes (born 1960), American golfer
- Jenny Geddes (c. 1600 – c. 1660), Scottish activist, arguably catalyzed the Wars of the Three Kingdoms
- Jim Geddes (born 1949), American baseball pitcher
- John Geddes (disambiguation), multiple people
- Keith Geddes (born c. 1940s), Canadian computer scientist and academic
- Ken Geddes, American football player
- Leslie A. Geddes (1921–2009), Scottish-born engineer and physiologist
- Margaret Geddes (disambiguation), multiple people
- Norah Geddes (1887–1967), Scottish landscape designer
- Norman Bel Geddes (1893–1958), American theatrical and industrial designer
- Patrick Geddes (1854–1932), Scottish biologist and town planner
- Paul Geddes (politician) (1810–1889), American merchant and politician
- Pytt Geddes (1917–2006), Norwegian-born tai chi teacher
- Richard Geddes, American Academic
- Sir Reay Geddes, former chairman of the Dunlop Rubber Company
- Scott Geddes, Australian rugby league footballer
- Wilhelmina Geddes (1887–1955), Irish stained glass artist
- William Duguid Geddes (1828–1900), Scottish scholar and educationalist
- William George Nicholson Geddes (1913–1993), Scottish civil engineer

== Given name ==
- Geddes Granger, also known as Makandal Daaga, a Trinidad and Tobago political activist and revolutionary
- Geddes Rodgers, Artist, Castlemaine, Australia

== See also ==
- Baron Geddes, a title in the Peerage of the United Kingdom
- Clan Ged, Scottish clan
- Geddes (disambiguation), other things named Geddes
- Gaddy, a Scottish surname
- Kenneth Widmerpool, a central character in Anthony Powell's A Dance to the Music of Time novel sequence, "Geddes" being his grandfather's original surname.
