= Geddes =

Geddes may refer to:

== Places ==
Scotland

- Geddes, Highland, a small village south of Nairn in the Scottish Highlands
- Geddes House, Nairn

United States

- Geddes, New York, a town
- Geddes, South Dakota, a city
- Geddes, Michigan, an unincorporated community
  - Geddes Dam, dam in Michigan
- Geddes (Clifford, Virginia), a historic site included on the National Register of Historic Places listings in Amherst County, Virginia

Elsewhere

- Cape Geddes, Antarctica
- Geddes Crag, Antarctica
- Ladang Geddes, Malaysian rubber plantation, formerly owned by the Dunlop Rubber Company
- Geddes (crater), on the planet Mercury

== People ==
- Geddes (surname), people with the surname and an etymology

== Other ==
- Baron Geddes, a title in the Peerage of the United Kingdom
- Geddes Axe, retrenchment of British government expenditure following WW1, named after Sir Eric Geddes
