= Ross Geddes, 2nd Baron Geddes =

British peer & businessman (1907-1975)

Ross Campbell Geddes, 2nd Baron Geddes (20 July 1907 – 2 February 1975) was a British peer and business man, a member of the House of Lords from 1954 until his death.

== Early life ==
The eldest son of Auckland Geddes, 1st Baron Geddes, and his wife Isabella Gamble Ross, a daughter of W. A. Ross of New York City, he was educated at Rugby School and Gonville and Caius College, Cambridge, graduating BA and MA. Some of his summers were spent in Washington D.C., where his father was British ambassador between 1920 and 1924.

Geddes's sister Margaret (1913–1997) married Louis, Prince of Hesse and by Rhine, a brother-in-law of Philip Mountbatten, and he was a nephew of Eric Geddes, First Lord of the Admiralty during the First World War, who later planned the Geddes Axe.

== Career ==
In the 1930s, Geddes worked in an oil refinery in California and a chemical works in Baltimore.

With an interest in shipping, during the Second World War Geddes was Assistant Director in the Tanker Division of the Ministry of War Transport between 1940 and 1942, then until 1944 was a member of the British Merchant Shipping Mission to Washington, D.C., led by John Maclay. He returned to the Tanker Division as Deputy Director between 1944 and 1945.

In 1942, his father was created Baron Geddes of Rolvenden, Kent, and on 8 January 1954 he succeeded to the peerage, gaining a seat in the House of Lords. In September 1957 the Earl of Rosebery appointed him as a Deputy Lieutenant for Midlothian. In 1958, he became a Commander of the Order of the British Empire, then in 1970 a Knight Commander of the same order.

Geddes was chairman of several companies, Trident Tankers, Limmer Holdings, Clerical Medical and General Life Assurance, Monks Investment Trust, and the British Travel Association, and was also a director of P&O.

== Personal life ==
On 26 January 1931, Geddes married Enid Mary Butler, daughter of Clarence Howell Butler, of Tenterden, Kent, late of Shanghai, and they had three children:

- Neil Ross Geddes (born and died 1932)
- Margaret Ross Geddes (born 1934)
- Euan Michael Ross Geddes (born 1937)

In 1950 and 1957 Geddes had a Scottish home at Malleny House, Balerno.

Geddes died at sea, while on a cruise, on 2 February 1975, aged 67.

== Notes ==
Coat of arms of Ross Geddes, 2nd Baron Geddes
Crest A Scots pine tree growing out of a mound all Proper. Escutcheon Azure three geds naiant Or on a chief of the last as many boars' heads couped Sable armed Argent langued Gules. Supporters On a compartment semé of sea-pinks two geds Proper. Motto Capta Majora

Ross
