= Ged =

Ged or GED may refer to:

== Initialisms ==
- Gas electron diffraction
- General Educational Development test, an American and Canadian high school-level exam
- Graduated electronic decelerator, a device for administering electric shocks
- Graph edit distance, in mathematics

== Places ==
- Ged, Louisiana, US, an unincorporated community
- Delaware Coastal Airport, in Delaware, US, callsign GED

== People ==
- Ged Baldwin (1907–1991), Canadian politician
- William Ged (1699–1749), Scottish goldsmith and inventor
- Ged Peck (born 1947), English guitarist
- Ged Quinn (born 1963), English artist and musician
- Ged Walker (1960–2003), English police officer
- Ged Maybury (born 1953), New Zealand author
- Ged Killen (born 1986), Scottish politician
- Ged Nash (born 1975), Irish politician

== Other uses ==
- Ged (Earthsea), a fictional character in Ursula K. Le Guin's Earthsea realm
- Ged (heraldry), a term for the fish known in English as a pike
- Ged, northern English and Lowland Scots name for the pike fish Esox
- "G.E.D." (My Name Is Earl), a television episode
- .ged, a genealogical data format
- Clan Ged, a Scottish clan
