= John Geddes =

John Geddes may refer to:

- John Geddes (bishop) (1735–1799), Scottish Roman Catholic prelate
- John Geddes (politician) (1777–1828), American politician
- John Geddes (cyclist) (1936–2026), British cyclist
- John M. Geddes (1951–2026), American journalist
- John Geddes (dean of Niagara) (1811–1891), Canadian Anglican priest
- John Maxwell Geddes (1941–2017), Scottish composer and academic
- John Geddes (dean of Tuam) (fl. 1889–1917), archdeacon of Achonry and dean of Tuam
- John Stafford Geddes (1939–2024), Northern Irish cardiologist
- John Henry Geddes (1855–1909), Australian businessman
- Jack Geddes (footballer) (1868–1949), Australian rules footballer
- Jack Geddes (curler) (c. 1925–2017), Canadian curler
