= Gaddy =

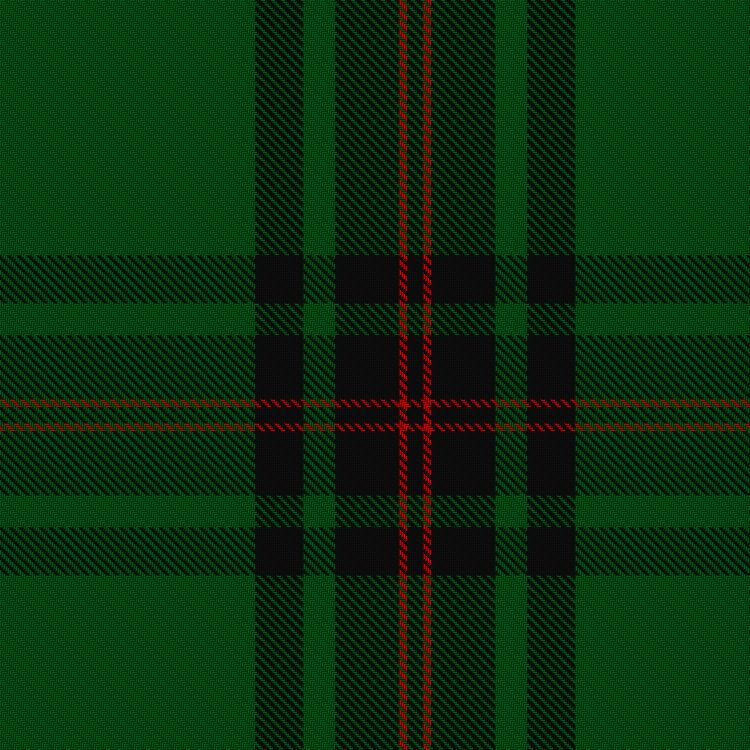
The Duke of Fife tartan, eligible to Clan Ged

Gaddy is a Scottish surname.

== Background ==
It is possibly first used by people of the Kingdom of Strathclyde along the Anglo-Scottish border. It is a name for someone who lived in Midlothian. It is possible that it evolved from the name Goldie, which derives from the Old English personal name Gold. Alternative spellings are Geddy, Gaddie, Goudie, Gouday, Goudey, Goudy, Gowdy, Gowdie, Gadie, Goodie, Gady. It is also possible that it derives from Geddes or Clan Ged. Another possibility is that it is derived from the Old English gedda, a nickname meaning pike.

== Notable people ==
Notable people with the surname or close variants include:

- Abdul Gaddy (born 1992), American basketball player
- Anthony Gadie (1868–1948), English businessman and politician
- Bea Gaddy (1933–2001), American humanitarian
- Bob Gaddy (1924–1997) American pianist, singer and songwriter
- Charlie Gaddy (1931–2025), American anchorman
- Daniel Abraham Gaddie (1836–1911), African-American Baptist preacher
- John Gaddy (1914–1966), American basketball player
- Rikki Gaddie (born 1971), South African former tennis player
