= Auckland Geddes, 1st Baron Geddes =

British politician (1879–1954)

The Right Honourable The Lord Geddes GCMG KCB PC
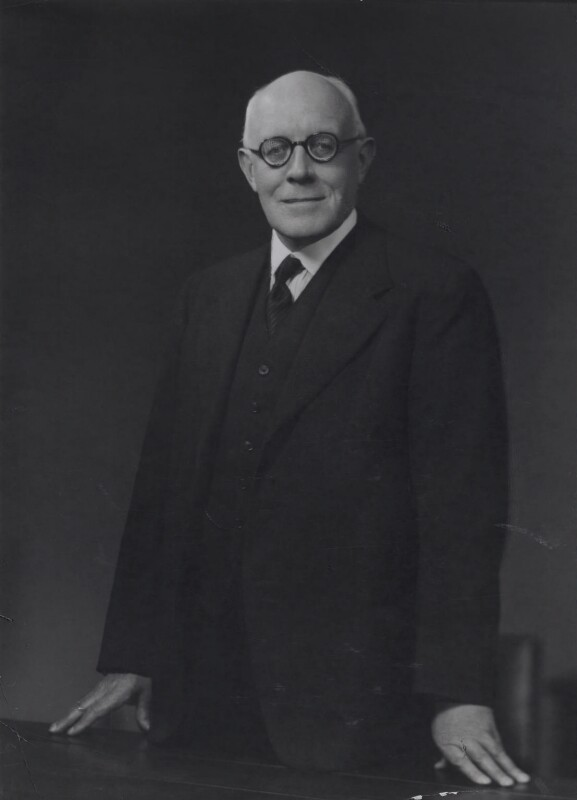
- Geddes in 1941

President of the Board of Trade
- In office 26 May 1919 – 19 March 1920
- Monarch: George V
- Prime Minister: David Lloyd George
- Preceded by: Sir Albert Stanley
- Succeeded by: Robert Horne

British Ambassador to the United States
- In office 1920–1924
- Monarch: George V
- Prime Minister: David Lloyd George; Bonar Law; Stanley Baldwin; Ramsay MacDonald
- Preceded by: The Viscount Grey of Fallodon
- Succeeded by: Sir Esme Howard

Member of Parliament for Basingtoke
- In office 1917–1920
- Monarch: George V
- Prime Minister: David Lloyd George
- Preceded by: Arthur Salter
- Succeeded by: Arthur Holbrook

Personal details
- Born: Auckland Campbell Geddes; 21 June 1879 London, England
- Died: 8 June 1954 (aged 74) London, England
- Party: Conservative
- Spouse: Isabella Ross
- Children: 5, including Ross and Margaret
- Relatives: Mona Chalmers Watson (sister); Eric Geddes (brother)

Military service
- Allegiance: United Kingdom
- Branch/service: British Army
- Years of service: 1901-1902; 1914-1918
- Rank: Major
- Unit: Highland Light Infantry; 17th Battalion, Northumberland Fusiliers
- Battles/wars: 2nd Boer War; World War One

Auckland Campbell Geddes, 1st Baron Geddes, GCMG, KCB, PC, FRSE (21 June 1879 – 8 June 1954) was a British academic, soldier, politician and diplomat. He was a member of David Lloyd George's coalition government during the First World War and also served as Ambassador to the United States.

== Early life ==
Geddes was born in London as the son of Auckland Campbell-Geddes, a civil engineer, and his wife Christina Helen MacLeod Anderson. He was the brother of Sir Eric Campbell-Geddes, First Lord of the Admiralty during the First World War and principal architect of the Geddes Axe, which led to the retrenchment of British public expenditure following the War. His sister was Dr. Mona Chalmers Watson, the first woman to graduate M.D. from the University of Edinburgh and the first chief controller of the Women's Army Auxiliary Corps.

== Career ==
=== Boer War ===
Geddes served in the Second Boer War in South Africa between 1901 and 1902 as a second lieutenant in the Highland Light Infantry. On 2 June 1902 he was promoted a lieutenant in the 3rd (Militia) battalion of the regiment, and he returned home with other men of this battalion on the SS Doune Castle in September 1902, after the war had ended two months earlier.

=== Academic career ===
Geddes was educated at George Watson's College in Edinburgh. He then studied medicine at Edinburgh University graduating MB ChB in 1903. From 1906 to 1909, Geddes was an assistant professor of anatomy at Edinburgh University. The university gave him his doctorate (MD) in 1908.

In 1909 he was elected a Fellow of the Royal Society of Edinburgh; his proposers were William Turner, Sir Edward Albert Sharpey-Schafer, David Waterston and George Chrystal. From 1913 to 1914 he was a professor of anatomy at the Royal College of Surgeons in Ireland. From 1913 to 1914, he was a professor of anatomy at McGill University. His academic career was interrupted by the First World War, during which he served as a brigadier general in the War Office.

=== First World War ===
During the First World War he served as a Major in the 17th Northumberland Fusiliers and was on the staff of the General Headquarters in France as a Brevet Lieutenant-Colonel and Honorary Brigadier General. Geddes was Director of Recruiting at the War Office from 1916 to 1917.

=== Political and diplomatic career ===
In 1917 he was elected Unionist Member of Parliament for Basingstoke, a seat he held until 1920. He was sworn of the Privy Council in 1917 and served under David Lloyd George as Director of National Service from 1917 to 1918, as President of the Local Government Board from 1918 to 1919, as Minister of Reconstruction in 1919 and as President of the Board of Trade (with a seat in the cabinet) from 1919 to 1920.

Geddes was appointed Principal of McGill University in 1919 but never undertook his official duties. He resigned from the post in 1920 after being appointed British Ambassador to the United States, in which position he served until 1924. As His Majesty's ambassador, Geddes investigated the treatment of British immigrants at Ellis Island, for which he wrote a report (1923). He was also heavily involved in the negotiations that led up to the Washington Naval Treaty of 1922, which limited the size and number of the world's battleships. He was appointed Knight Grand Cross of the Order of St. Michael and St. George (G.C.M.G.) in 1922.

From 1924 to 1947, he was the chairman of the mining companies the Rio Tinto Company and the closely associated Rhokana Corporation. He returned to public service during the Second World War when he served as commissioner for civil defence for the South-East Region from 1939 to 1944 and for the North-West Region from 1941 to 1942. The latter year he was raised to the peerage as Baron Geddes, of Rolvenden in the County of Kent.

== Personal life ==
On 8 September 1906, Geddes was married to Isabella Gamble Ross (1881–1962) at St. Mary's Church in Livingston, Staten Island. Isabella was a daughter of William Adolphus Ross (1843–1912) of Staten Island, New York, one of the largest soft drink manufacturers in Ireland (W A Ross & Sons Ltd, with Ross's Royal Ginger Ale, the firm's principal product) and who settled in New York. Together, Geddes and his wife had five children:

- Ross Campbell Geddes, 2nd Baron Geddes (1907–1975), who married Enid Mary Butler, only child of Clarence Henry Butler, of Tenterden.
- Hon. Alexander Campbell Geddes (1910–1972), a lieutenant-colonel; he married Margaret Kathleen Addis, daughter of Sir Charles Stewart Addis. They divorced in 1964 and he married, secondly, Princess and Altgräfin Marie-Anne Helene Emanuela of Salm-Reifferscheidt-Krautheim und Dyck (1933–2015), daughter of Franz, 6th Prince of Salm-Reifferscheidt-Krautheim and Dyck, and Princess Cäcilie of Salm-Salm, on 27 July 1964.
- Hon. Margaret Campbell Geddes (1913–1997), who married Louis, Prince of Hesse and by Rhine, the last surviving member of this family.
- Hon. John Reay Campbell Geddes (1915–1978), who married Diana Elizabeth Swift, a daughter of Brig. Charles Copley Swift.
- Hon. David Campbell Geddes (1917–1995), who married Gerda Meyer Bruun, daughter of Norwegian minister of trade Gerdt Meyer Bruun, in 1948.

Lord Geddes died in January 1954, aged 74, and was succeeded in the barony by his eldest son, Ross. Lady Geddes died in January 1962.

== Arms ==
Coat of arms of Auckland Geddes, 1st Baron Geddes
Crest A Scots pine tree growing out of a mound all Proper. Escutcheon Azure three geds naiant Or on a chief of the last as many boars' heads couped Sable armed Argent langued Gules. Supporters On a compartment semé of sea-pinks two geds Proper. Motto Capta Majora

Parliament of the United Kingdom
Preceded by Arthur Salter	Member of Parliament for Basingstoke; 1917 – 1920	Succeeded by Arthur Richard Holbrook
Political offices
Preceded by Neville Chamberlain	Director of National Service; 1917–1919	Post abolished
Preceded by William Hayes Fisher	President of the Local Government Board; 1918–1919	Succeeded by Christopher Addison
Preceded by Christopher Addison	Minister of Reconstruction; 1919	Office abolished
Preceded by Sir Albert Stanley	President of the Board of Trade; 1919–1920	Succeeded by Robert Horne
Diplomatic posts
Preceded by The Viscount Grey of Fallodon	Ambassador to the United States; 1920–1924	Succeeded by Sir Esme Howard
Peerage of the United Kingdom
New creation	Baron Geddes; 1942–1954	Succeeded by Ross Campbell Geddes
