= John Stafford Geddes =

Northern Irish cardiologist and electrophysiologist

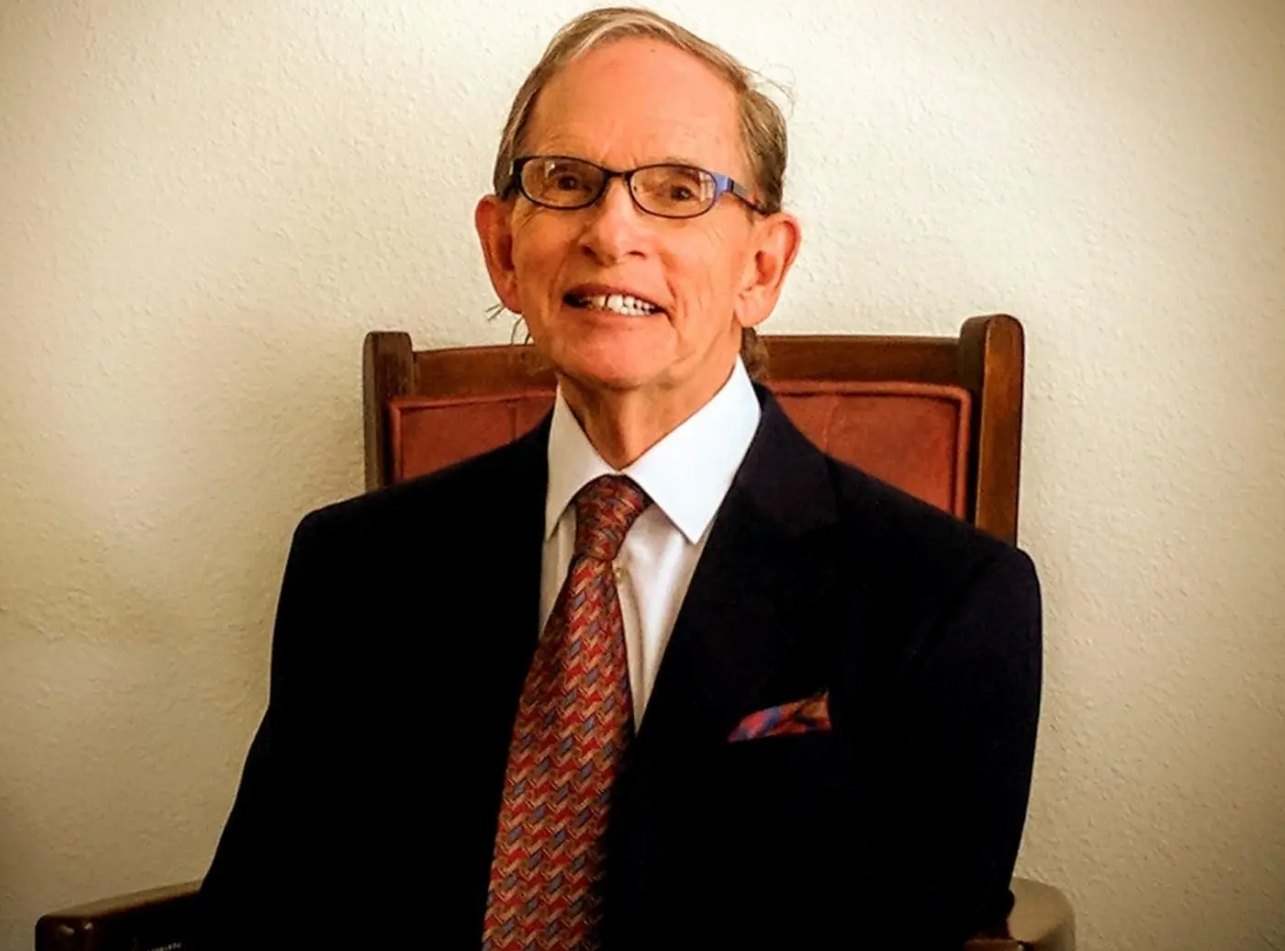
- Born: 10 June 1939; Belfast, Northern Ireland
- Died: 9 October 2024 (aged 85); Florida, United States
- Occupations: Cardiologist, electrophysiologist
- Known for: Co-development of first mobile coronary care unit and portable defibrillator
- Spouse: Florence Geddes (m. c. 1969; his death 2024)
- Children: 2 (Stephen and Johnny)

John Stafford Geddes (10 June 1939 – 9 October 2024) was a Northern Irish cardiologist and electrophysiologist. He contributed to the development of portable defibrillation and the first mobile coronary care unit in Belfast during the 1960s, innovations that were later adopted internationally and influenced pre-hospital emergency cardiac care.

== Early life and education ==
John Stafford Geddes was born on 10 June 1939 in Belfast, Northern Ireland, the son of Stafford Geddes, a pioneering consultant anaesthetist in Belfast. He attended Campbell College in Belfast and later studied medicine at Queen's University Belfast, receiving an entrance scholarship in 1956. During his studies, he completed an intercalated Bachelor of Science in physiology, graduating with first-class honours, and was awarded the Milroy Medal in physiology and the Thomson Medal in medicine. He earned his MD by thesis in 1966.

Geddes became a member of the Royal College of Physicians (MRCP) in 1967, a fellow of the American College of Cardiology (FACC) in 1977, and a fellow of the Royal College of Physicians (FRCP) in 1978.

== Career ==
Geddes began his medical career as a house officer at the Royal Victoria Hospital in Belfast, where he worked with Frank Pantridge on early developments in pre-hospital cardiac care, including portable defibrillation. He contributed to the launch of the world’s first mobile coronary care unit in Belfast on 1 January 1966, which used a 70 kg defibrillator assembled from car batteries. Pantridge credited Geddes with contributions to in-hospital resuscitation and the unit’s establishment. The unit and related techniques were subsequently reported in The Lancet and influenced similar services internationally.

In 1967, Geddes established a pacemaker clinic at the Royal Victoria Hospital and was appointed as a consultant in the hospital’s cardiac department. He spent 1969 as a fellow in experimental electrophysiology at the University of Utah. In 1987, he became director of electrophysiology and associate professor in the Department of Medicine at the University of Manitoba, Winnipeg, where he worked full-time until retirement in 1999 and continued part-time consultancy thereafter.

In 1996–1997, Geddes collaborated with colleagues in Australia and Qantas to investigate the use of automatic external defibrillators on long-haul flights. He published research on clinical cardiology and electrophysiology in peer-reviewed medical journals throughout his career. His final work, The Evolution of Pre-Hospital Emergency Care: Belfast and Beyond, summarized 50 years of experience with mobile coronary care in Belfast and emergency medical services in Nova Scotia.

== Publications and legacy ==
Geddes co-authored papers on mobile coronary care and electrophysiology, including early work with Pantridge. His final book, The Evolution of Pre-Hospital Emergency Care: Belfast and Beyond (2017, co-authored with Ronald D. Stewart and Tom Baskett), summarized these developments and was presented to the Nova Scotia House of Assembly. He contributed to the development of rapid pre-hospital defibrillation and mobile coronary care, practices later adopted in emergency cardiac services internationally.

== Personal life ==
Geddes was married to Florence, a cardiac nurse, until his death. They had two sons, Stephen and Johnny, both residing in Florida. In retirement, he engaged in recreational activities, including golf, photography, travel, music, and nature. He died in Florida on 9 October 2024 after a short illness.

== Selected publications ==
- O’Rourke, Michael F.; Donaldson, Eric; Geddes, John S. (4 November 1997). "An Airline Cardiac Arrest Program". Circulation. 96 (9): 2849–2853. doi:10.1161/01.CIR.96.9.2849.
- Geddes, J.S. (September 2021). "My Memoirs of the Royal Victoria Hospital Pacemaker Implantations in the West Wing Over Half a Century Ago!". The Ulster Medical Journal. 90 (3): 200. PMID 34815607.
