= Ladang Geddes =

Former rubber estate in Malaysia

Ladang Geddes 榕吉
- Rubber estate
- Etymology: Sir Eric Geddes
- Interactive map of Ladang Geddes
- Coordinates: 2°51′30.1″N 102°31′19.7″E
- Country: British Malaya (later Malaysia)
- State: Negeri Sembilan
- District: Jempol (previously Kuala Pilah)
- Established: 1929
- Sold and broken up: 1966–1967
- Founded by: Dunlop Plantations, Ltd.

Area
  - Total: 8,917 ha (22,035 acres)
  - Planted: 5,414 ha (13,379 acres)
- as at December 1933

Population (December 1933)
  - Total: 2,000
  - Employees (March 1967): 2,600
- estate labour force
- Owner: Dunlop Plantations, Ltd., a subsidiary of the Dunlop Rubber Company

Ladang Geddes (Chinese: 榕吉) was a Malaysian rubber estate. It was the world's largest estate for 'experimental block budded rubber planting' in conjunction with the Rubber Research Institute in Malaysia around 1930. It later became the largest area of new village settlement in Malaysia.

== History ==
The estate was founded by Dunlop Malayan Estates, Ltd, Mr Fred Ascoli was the head of Dunlop Malayan Estates office in London at that time. In 1935, the plantation manager in charge was Mr E M Hawes and assistants were: V Bolton, W. Wall, J N Huges and T McAlpine.

Ladang Geddes Rubber Estate was about 22,035 acres (8917 ha) of which 13,247 acres (5361 ha) were planted (22 blocks planting × 800 acres (3.2 km^{2}) per block) in the area and was situated between 10 and 12 miles (19 km) from Bahau, Negeri Sembilan. It was next to the Bahau, Rompin Malay and Sealing estates.

== Design ==
At its centre was ‘Centre Village’ (or Kongsi in Chinese) containing the main administrative office. It had 15 plantation managers' houses, a clubhouse with swimming pool for senior managers and another for middle management. Three of the plantation manager houses have been destroyed since it was sold in 1966. The senior management clubhouse has been used as a shooting club since 1970.

The estate had a rubber collection factory and a DC electric powerhouse half a mile (800 m) from the office. Along the way from centre administration office to E Village were 80 to 100 houses for factory and clerical workers, a hospital with three doctors and five nursing quarters. The estate hospital provided a standard of care broadly in line with British hospitals. Clean water was supplied by a power plant in "C3 Village". A few sundry shops were available for provisions, along with laundry, bus and lorry company depot, Chinese school (primary Chung Hua) established in 1937. Some of the Chinese students extended their tertiary education and qualified as Engineers, accountants etc.) A Tamil school operated at the Centre Village. A football field was placed in front of the small police station.

At the peak of the production, from the 1930s to 1966, the plantation was divided into 10 villages. Each village housed 200 to 300 workers who were mostly Chinese except in Centre Village where Indian workers lived. Sungai Tebu (river) ran through the plantation and its source was South Village.

Each village produced about 6,000 to 8,000 kg of latex/day or about three million kilogrammes of rubber a year from 1930 to 1966.

The plantation was sold in 1966.
