= John Anderson (inventor) =

John Anderson (1942 – 7 April 2012) was a co-founder, a director and the chief technology officer of Intelesens Ltd. and HeartSine Technologies Inc. Anderson formed the Northern Ireland Bio-Engineering Centre (NIBEC) and was its first director. He was also the head of the School of Electrical and Mechanical Engineering at the University of Ulster (Jordanstown), Northern Ireland. He was the head of bioengineering at the Royal Victoria Hospital in Northern Ireland, when the world's first mobile coronary care unit was launched in 1967.

Professor Frank Pantridge was responsible for development of the world's first portable defibrillator designed for use outside of hospital, which was subsequently manufactured and sold throughout the world. Anderson worked with Pantridge on its development.

Anderson received M.Phil. and D.Phil. in bioengineering and was granted a personal chair in medical electronics in 1990. In 1994 he was made a founding fellow of the Biological Engineering Society. He was a chartered scientist and a fellow of the Royal College of Physicians. He published over 300 papers in the field of bioengineering research and hold 40 patents in the field. He was previously an active member of the Association for the Advancement of Medical Instrumentation (AAMI) standards committees for conventional defibrillation and semi automatic defibrillation.

He was also responsible for developing the technology utilised in many defibrillators, including semi automatic and telephone controlled devices, being marketed today. His publication record reflected his intense interest in sudden cardiac death with particular reference to the early and rapid treatment of cardiac arrest.

In 2002 Anderson was awarded a UK Business Fellowship, one of only twelve in the UK. During his working career, he was responsible for ten start-up companies in the field of medical engineering.
