= Malleny House and Garden =

Historic site in Balnero, Scotland

Coordinates: 55°53′5.22″N 3°20′12.16″W

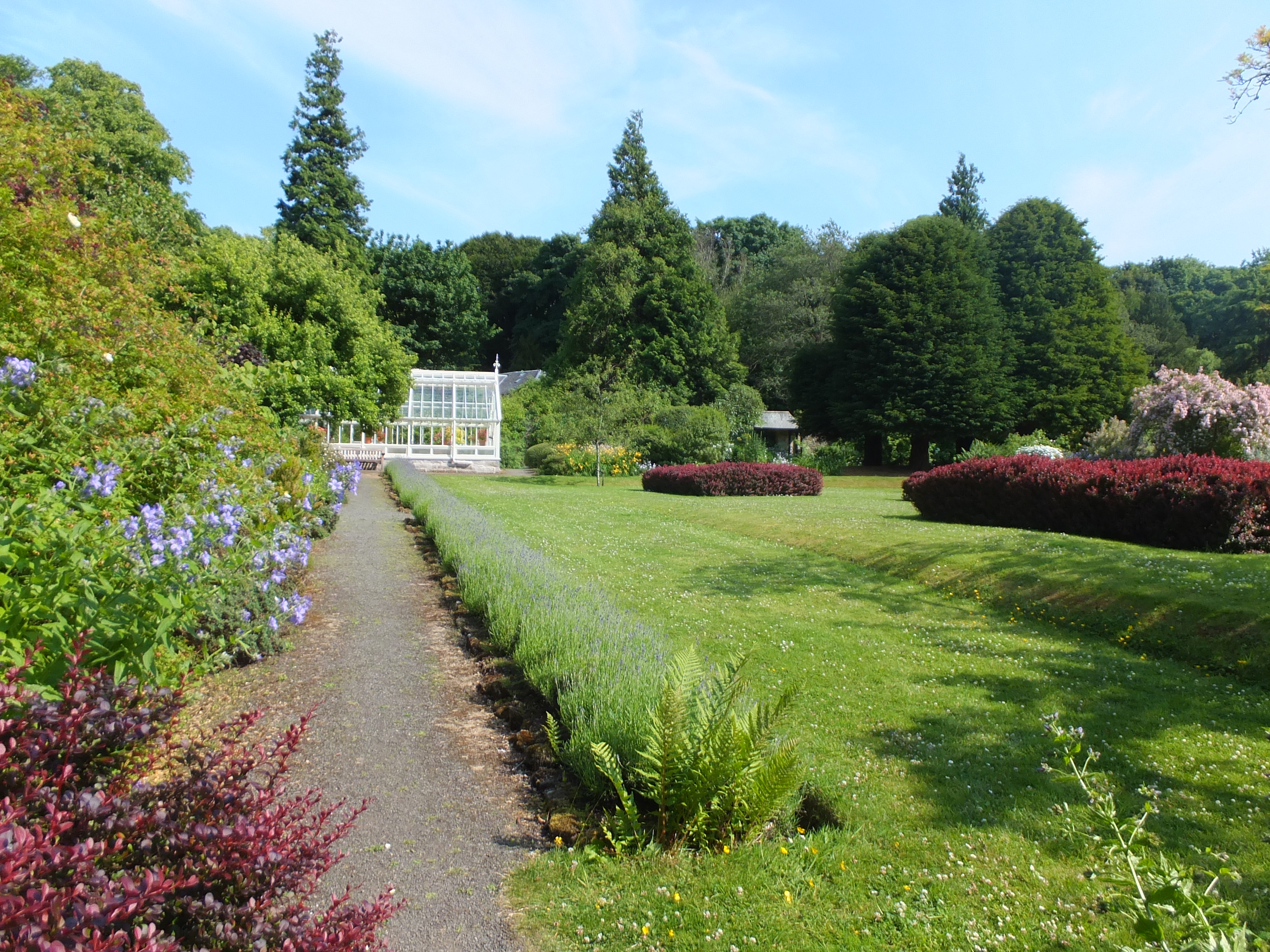
Lavender Walk, Malleny Garden

The Malleny House and Garden is an historic house and garden owned by the National Trust for Scotland in Balerno, 6 mi (9.7 km) southwest of Edinburgh. The gardens are notable for its large yew trees, as well as one of the largest rose collections in Scotland. According to Historic Environment Scotland, Malleny is noted for its outstanding architectural and horticultural value including its national collection of heritage shrub roses. The house, gardens and adjoining estate buildings are Category A listed.

== House and ownership ==
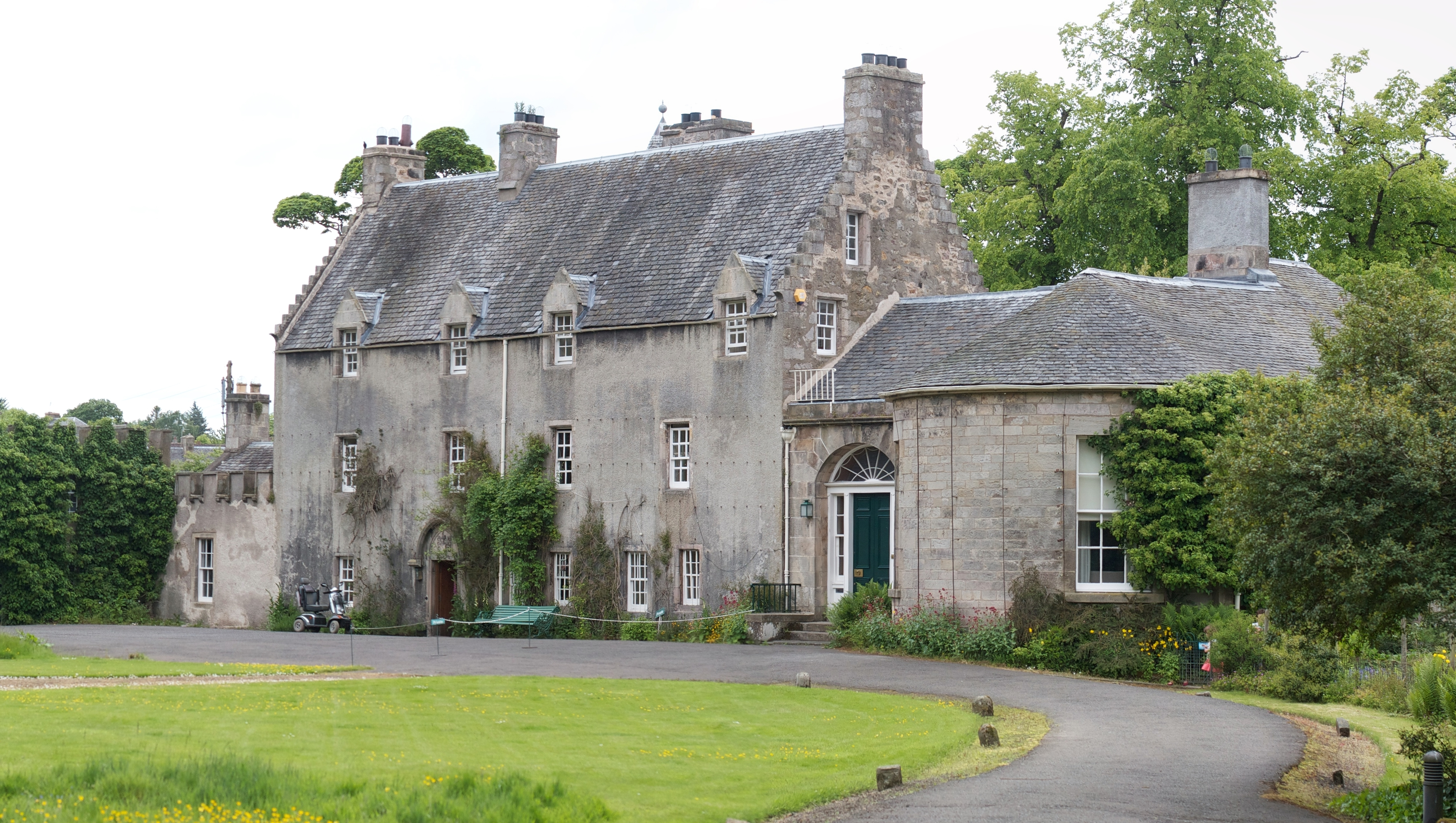
Malleny House seen in 2013

Malleny House in its current form was principally built between 1635 and the late 17th century. It is thought that Sir James Murray of Kilbaberton was the designer of the main house building. The house incorporates parts of an early house dated to 1589. The house is two storeys and has been expanded to include crenelations, as well as a Georgian extension in a dome shape build circa 1820 for General Thomas Scott. The dovecote, with space for 915 nests, dates from the early 18th century and is separately listed. The house and gardens originally formed part of a much larger Malleny Estate, which in 1882 comprised 3,000 acres, however by the 20th century the estate was fragmented and sold into its present form.

The house was home to a succession of owners, including the Knychtsounes, Sir William Scott, Lord Clerkington and his son Sir John Scott, the 1st Scott of Malleny. The Scotts of Malleny then held the estate for several generations, including under General Thomas Scott. In 1882 the house and gardens were purchased by the 5th Earl of Rosebery and subsequently leased to several tenants. Tenants included Thomas Gibson-Carmichael, 1st Baron Carmichael who added much ironwork to the garden and estate (although notable ironwork pieces were removed to his other home at Skirling when he was appointed Governor of Victoria); and in the 1950s Ross Geddes, 2nd Baron Geddes.

In 1960, the house and gardens were sold to Commander and Mrs Gore-Browne Henderson. During their ownership, eight of the 17th century Yews were removed and many roses added to the garden. In 1968, the house, gardens and ancillary estate buildings were donated to the National Trust for Scotland.

== Garden ==
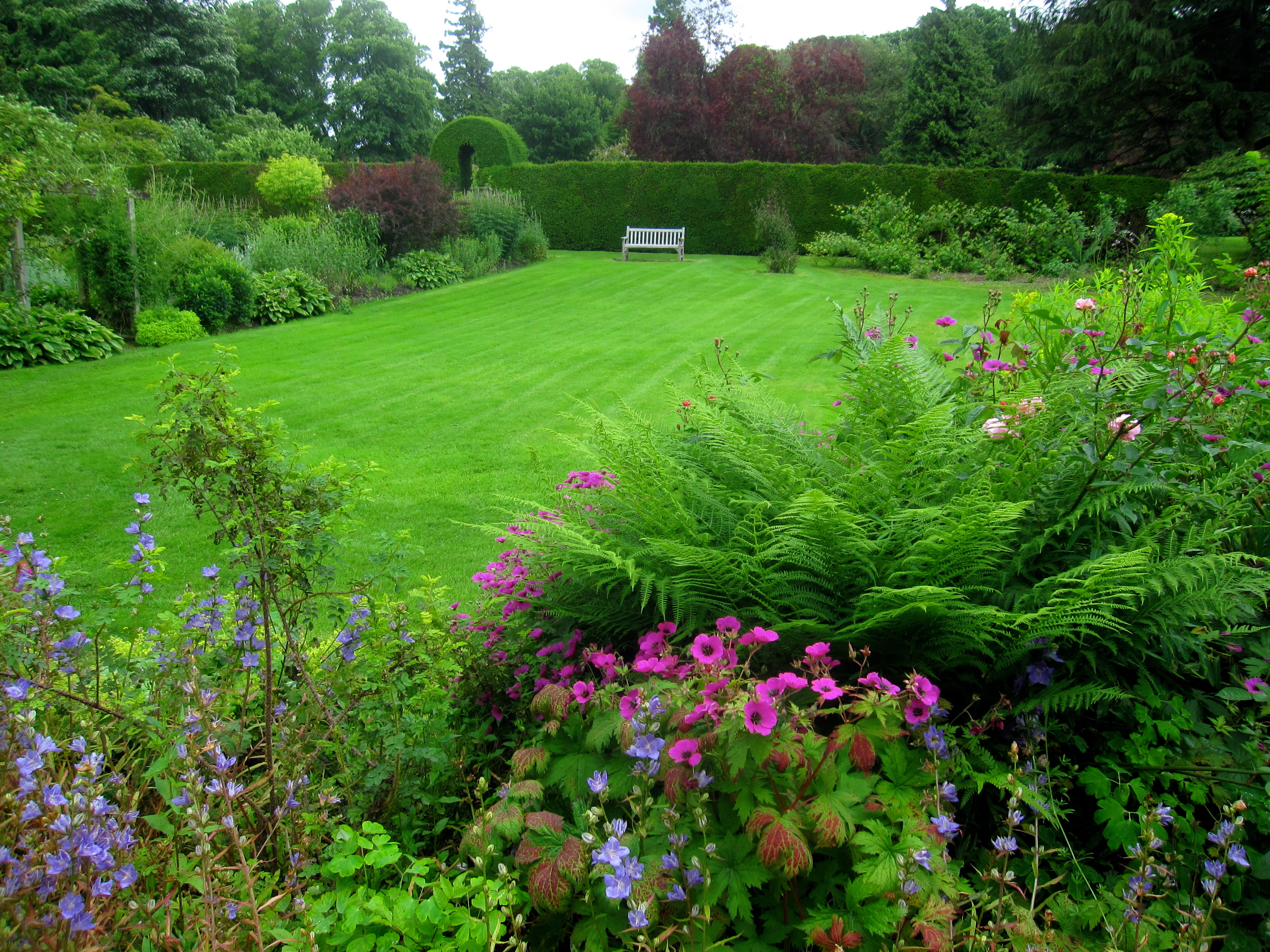
Part of the garden as seen in 2012

Designations

Inventory of Gardens and Designed Landscapes in Scotland
- Official name: Malleny
- Designated: 30 June 1987
- Reference no.: GDL00272

The garden is open to members and paying visitors and consist of a 3-acre (12,000 m^{2}) walled garden set in approximately nine acres of woodland. The gardens feature four 100-year-old yew trees known as the Four Apostles and was home to Scotland's National Bonsai Collection, which left around 2000 and is now located at Binny Plants near Ecclesmachan. The house is not open to the public. The garden was celebrated in the 17th century for their Dutch-style of gardens. There are over 150 varieties of roses at Malleny, including the National Collection of 19th century Shrub Roses, as recorded by the National Council for the Conservation of Plants and Gardens. The current layout of the garden dates from the mid to late 19th century. The gardens contain two old Victorian glasshouses.

== Access ==
Access to the gardens is via a rusticated rubble sandstone bridge over the Bavelaw burn on the edge of Balerno. There is very limited parking on the site but numerous free parking is available in Balerno itself.
