= Clan Ged =

Scottish clan

Crest badge suitable for members of Clan Ged.

Clan Ged is a Scottish clan. The clan does not currently have a chief recognised by the Lord Lyon King of Arms and is considered an armigerous clan. Without a recognised chief the clan has no standing under Scots Law. In Scotland, the surname Ged and Geddes may be derived from the place-name Geddes in Nairn. Another possibility is that it is derived from the Old English gedda, a nickname meaning pike.

== Background ==
Arms of the Chief of clan Ged, The Ged of that Ilk.

The coats of arms of Ged and Geddes contain three pike, referring to their surnames. The English word for pike is luce, and several Norman families named de Lucy have pike on their coats of arms. One unsupported possibility is that one such family moved to Scotland and adopted the surnames Ged or Geddes. An early record of the clan name is found in the privy council, which records the respite granted to James Tweedie after the murder of William Geddes in 1558.

== Crest badge ==
The crest badge suitable for members of Clan Ged is derived from the arms of Ged of that Ilk, which is recorded in the Lyon Register. The crest badge contains the crest a pike's head Proper and the motto DURAT DITAT PLACET (from Latin: "it sustains, it enriches, it pleases"). The crest of a pike is a pun on the clan name. The use of pike on the arms is an example of canting arms, as a ged is the heraldic term for a pike.

== Tartan ==
Members of the clan are entitled to wear the Duke of Fife tartan.
