= Frank Pantridge =

Northern Irish cardiologist and inventor (1916–2004)

- Born: 3 October 1916; Hillsborough, County Down, Ireland
- Died: 26 December 2004 (aged 88); Hillsborough, County Down, Northern Ireland
- Occupation: Cardiologist
- Known for: Portable defibrillator

James Francis Pantridge, CBE MC OStJ (3 October 1916 – 26 December 2004), usually known as Frank Pantridge, was a Northern Irish physician, cardiologist, and professor who transformed emergency medicine and paramedic services with the invention of the portable defibrillator.

== Early life ==
Pantridge was born in Hillsborough, County Down (now Royal Hillsborough), Ireland, on 3 October 1916. He was educated at Friends' School Lisburn and Queen's University of Belfast, graduating in medicine in 1939.

== Military service ==
During World War II he served in the British Army. He was commissioned into the Royal Army Medical Corps as a lieutenant on 12 April 1940. He was given the service number 128673. He was awarded the Military Cross during the Fall of Singapore, when he became a POW. He served much of his captivity as a slave labourer on the Burma Railway. When he was freed at the war's end, Pantridge was emaciated and had contracted cardiac beriberi; he suffered from ill-health related to the disease for the rest of his life.

== Medical career ==
After Pantridge's liberation he worked as a lecturer in the pathology department at Queen's University, and then won a scholarship to the University of Michigan, where he studied under Frank Norman Wilson, a cardiologist and authority on electrocardiography.

He returned to Northern Ireland in 1950, and was appointed as cardiac consultant to the Royal Victoria Hospital, Belfast and professor at Queen's University, where he remained until his retirement in 1982. There he established a specialist cardiology unit whose work became known around the world.

By 1957 Pantridge and his colleague John Geddes had introduced the modern system of cardiopulmonary resuscitation (CPR) for the early treatment of cardiac arrest. Further study led Frank Pantridge to the realisation that many deaths resulted from ventricular fibrillation which needed to be treated before the patient was admitted to hospital. This led to his introduction of the mobile coronary care unit (MCCU), an ambulance with specialist equipment and staff to provide pre-hospital care.

During his time living in the hills beyond Poleglass, to extend the usefulness of early treatment, Pantridge developed the portable defibrillator, and in 1965 installed his first version in a Belfast ambulance. It weighed 70 kg and operated from car batteries, but by 1968 he had designed an instrument weighing only 3 kg, incorporating a miniature capacitor manufactured for NASA. Much of Pantridge's research was conducted alongside colleague John Anderson, the head of Biomedical Engineering at Royal Victoria Hospital, Belfast, who later co-founded Heartsine.

His work was backed up by clinical investigations and epidemiological studies in scientific papers, including an influential 1967 The Lancet article. With these developments, the Belfast treatment system, often known as the "Pantridge Plan", became adopted throughout the world by emergency medical services. The portable defibrillator became recognised as a key tool in first aid, and Pantridge's refinement of the automated external defibrillator (AED) allowed it to be used safely by members of the public.

Although he was known worldwide as the "Father of Emergency Medicine", Frank Pantridge was less acclaimed in his own country, and was saddened that it took until 1990 for all front-line ambulances in the UK to be fitted with defibrillators.

== Honours and decorations ==
Pantridge was awarded the Military Cross "in recognition of gallant and distinguished services in Malaya in 1942". The citation read:

This officer worked unceasingly under the most adverse conditions of continuous bombing and shelling and was an inspiring example to all with whom he came into contact. He was absolutely cool under the heaviest fire.

In June 1969, he was appointed Officer of the Order of St. John (OStJ). He was appointed Commander of the Order of the British Empire (CBE) in the 1979 New Year Honours.

The city of Lisburn commissioned a statue of Pantridge, which stands outside the council's offices at the Lagan Valley Island centre.

A blue plaque to Pantridge was erected by the entrance to the Royal Victoria Hospital in Belfast in 2021.

Pantridge Road in Poleglass, Belfast was named after him.

Pantridge Link, Royal Hillsborough was also named after him.

== Personal life ==
Partridge lived in Collin House, Poleglass, in the 1960s and 70s.

== Death ==
Pantridge died aged 88 on St. Stephen’s Day 2004. He was unmarried.
