= Margaret Geddes (artist) =

British artist (1914–1998)

- Born: 7 November 1914; Cheam, Surrey
- Died: 1998 (aged 83–84)
- Education: Westminster School of Art
- Known for: Landscape and figure painter

For the Australian writer, Margaret Geddes, see Margaret Geddes (disambiguation). Margaret Geddes (7 November 1914 – 1998) was a British oil painter of landscapes and figure subjects who later developed an abstract style.

== Biography ==
Geddes was born in Cheam in Surrey and attended school in Eastbourne. She studied at the Westminster School of Art in London, where she was taught by both Walter Bayes and Mark Gertler, from 1930 to 1936. Geddes began exhibiting in group shows while still a student and in 1938, was elected to the National Society of Painters, Sculptors and Gravers.

During World War II, Geddes worked as a draughtswoman in the Fire Service Department of the Home Office. After the war, she resumed her exhibition career, showing regularly with the London Group, the New English Art Club, the Society of Women Artists and at the Royal Academy. The Leicester Galleries and the Redfern Gallery also displayed her work. Her first solo exhibition was hosted by the Artists' International Association in 1950. Further solo exhibitions at the Halesworth Gallery in Suffolk and at Teddington in 1973 followed. From 1951 to 1955, Geddes served as the chairperson of the Women's International Art Club.

Over time, Geddes's painting moved from figuration to abstraction. In 1996, Geddes, with Alzheimer's Disease retired to a nursing home. Retrospectives of her work were held at the Woodlands Art Gallery in London in 1998, and at Camden Fine Art in Bath, the following year.
