= 1917 Cambridge by-election =

UK Parliamentary by-election

The 1917 Cambridge by-election was held on 25 July 1917. The by-election was held due to the resignation of the incumbent Conservative MP, Almeric Paget. It was won by the Conservative candidate Eric Geddes, who was coming in as First Lord of the Admiralty and who was unopposed due to a War-time electoral pact.
