= Ulster Medical Society =

The Ulster Medical Society was formed in Belfast, County Antrim, Northern Ireland, in 1862 through the amalgamation of two older societies, the Belfast Medical Society which was founded in 1806, and the Belfast Clinical and Pathological Society which was founded in 1853. The first meeting of the Ulster Medical Society was held in the library of the Belfast General Hospital on 3 May 1862, and was "largely and influentially attended".

A May 1862 article in the Belfast News Letter said the goal of the formation of the two entities was to provide:

[A] central reading room for the accommodation of its members; to afford them increased facilities of consulting the best medical works and periodicals by means of their library and newsroom; of deriving mutual instruction and its pathological museum; and, as a collective body, protecting the interests of the medical profession, a duty heretofore devolving upon the Medical Protective Society, whose office and functions the new society has now assumed.

The UMS publishes a quarterly journal, Ulster Medical Journal, available free on the Society's website.
