= Pastoral Finance Association =

Defunct company in Australia

Pastoral Finance Association, officially Pastoral Finance Association Limited, also known as 'P.F.A.', was a company operating in Australia from 1890 to 1922. It is now mainly remembered for the large fire that all but totally destroyed its wool storage building at Kirribilli, Sydney, in December 1921, and for an important principle of case law.

== Origins, names, and ownership ==
The origin of the company stems from J.H. Geddes and Company, originally fellmongers and wool scourers, which in 1885 expanded its business to include wool auctions and other produce sales, from its warehouse in Phillip Street, Sydney.

John Henry Geddes (1855—1909)—always better known as J.H. Geddes—was the son of Irish-born John Geddes (1823—1894), originally a fellmonger at Camperdown, but later a wool broker who also ran a wool scouring business, at what is now Bunnerong Road, Botany.

John Geddes handed over day-to-day management of the wool scour and tannery business to two of his sons, Alexander and John Henry. In 1880, they expanded it, by acquiring the Floodvale wool scouring works. Under the trading name, A. & J.H. Geddes, by 1881, they were employing 100 men and processing 80 to 100 bales of wool per day. By 1885, Geddes was in charge of the business by himself, leading to his becoming key to the establishment of the company, in 1890, that would become Pastoral Finance Association, Limited.

In May 1890, a decision was taken to incorporate the venture as, J. H. Geddes and Co., The Pastoralists' Association, Limited. Land with a water frontage had been secured at Kirribilli, and a board of directors nominated, with J.H. Geddes as managing director. Its other shareholders were mainly leading pastoralists, and from the outset had the nature of a cooperative. The chairman of the board was George Cox (1824–1901) and the vice-chairman was Russell Barton (1830–1916).

Later, the company amalgamated with two other ventures—Pastoral Finance Trust and Agency Company of Australasia, Limited—and the name of the combined entity changed to J.H. Geddes and Co., the Pastoral Finance Association, Limited.

In 1894, J.H. Geddes severed his connection with the company, selling his shares, and the company's name changed to its final form, Pastoral Finance Association, Limited (P.F.A.). Russell Barton became chairman, after Cox's death in 1901, and was briefly managing director in 1902.

== History of operations ==
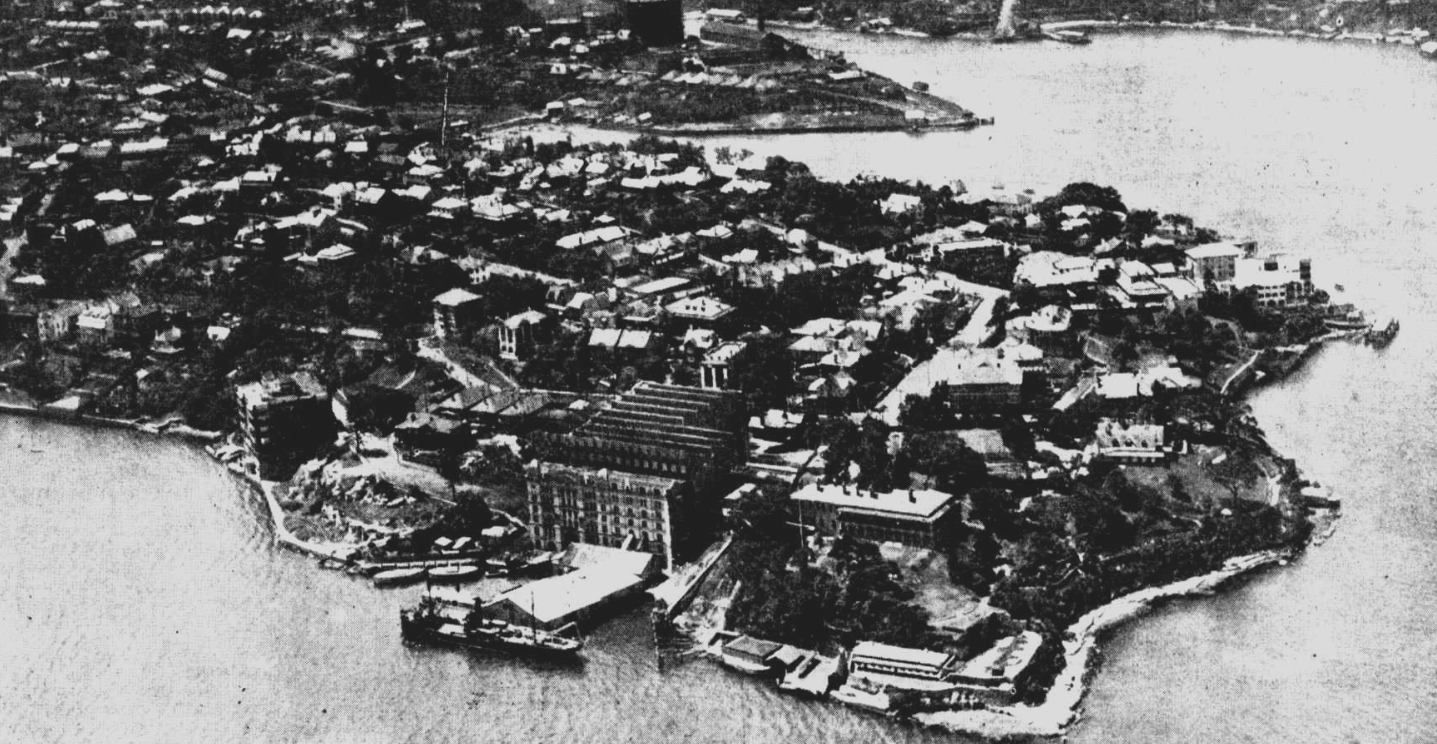
Aerial view of Kirribilli Point, with P.F.A. in the foreground, slightly to left of centre.

=== Kirribilli wool store and wharf ===
Work began on excavations for a new warehouse facility, in Kirribilli, around May 1890. The keystone of the building was officially laid in a ceremony in December 1890, and the new facility was officially opened in October 1891. It was adjacent to Admiralty House, extending to Beulah Street, and at its rear to what was then called Campbell Street, modern-day Kirribilli Avenue. Along the waterfront, the building stood seven storeys high. Due to the natural slope of the land, at its rear, only three to four of the seven storeys projected above ground level. The site had area of six acres. around 60 men were employed there by 1921.

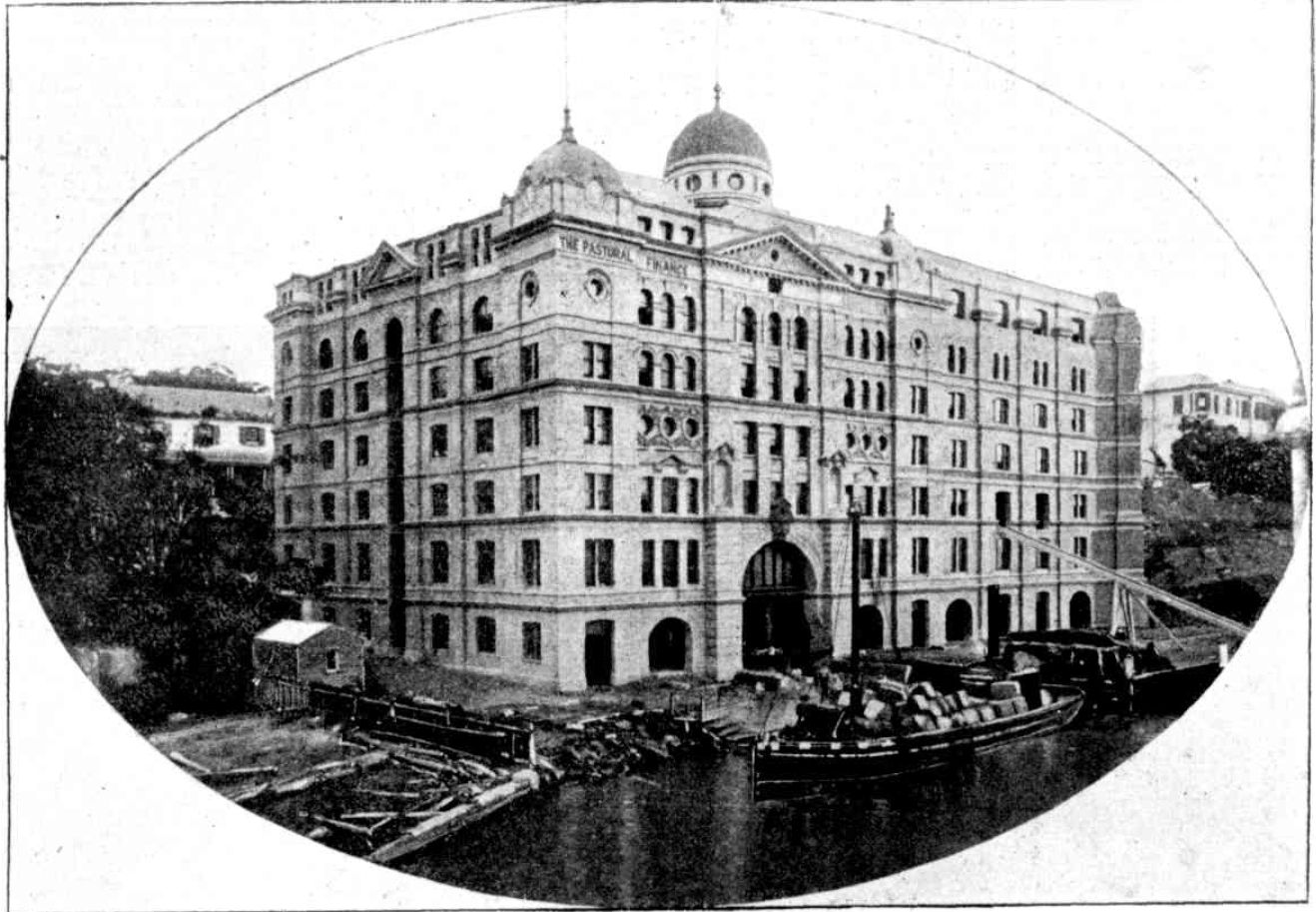
The P.F.A. wool store in 1895.

The facility included a wool warehouse, meat cold store, and wharf. It included generators for electricity, as well as large compressors for refrigeration. Its capacity was 26,000 bales of wool and 60,000 sheep carcasses. There was a wharf of 20,000 sq. feet in area, with 40 feet of water depth, and a barge canal that ran 50 feet inside the building. Produce arriving at Darling Harbour goods yard by rail—the company had a rail siding there—would be ferried across the harbour in barges, avoiding the need to use road transport. Punts could carry two rail wagons across the harbour, allowing the wagons to be unloaded at Kirribilli. Similarly, wool, meat or skins destined for export could be dispatched by barge to where waiting ships were loading cargo, or loaded directly to ships at the company's own wharf.

=== Freezing operations and frozen meat store ===
J.H. Geddes was an advocate for chilled meat in 1892. He made a tour to Europe to inspect and research the industry there. The new freezing works was officially opened in 1893. Livestock was slaughtered and reduced to meat carcasses, at the existing abattoirs at Glebe Island, then sent by barge to Kirribilli. Around early 1893, meat freezing operations began, and the large cold store began to fill. A cargo of frozen mutton and beef was loaded onto the refrigerated steamship, Star of Victoria, destined for London in June 1894. The facility and wharf at Kirribilli became part of a large supply chain to buyers in London, who had facilities which received large shipments of frozen carcasses and had developed techniques to defrost the meat. After the Glebe Island Abattoirs closed in 1915, carcasses would have been sourced from the new State Abattoirs at Homebush Bay or from other abattoirs, by rail. Refrigerated rail wagons were brought across the harbour, two at a time, by barge.

=== Financing ===
The company provided finance to pastoralists, using funds that the company would borrow from English sources.

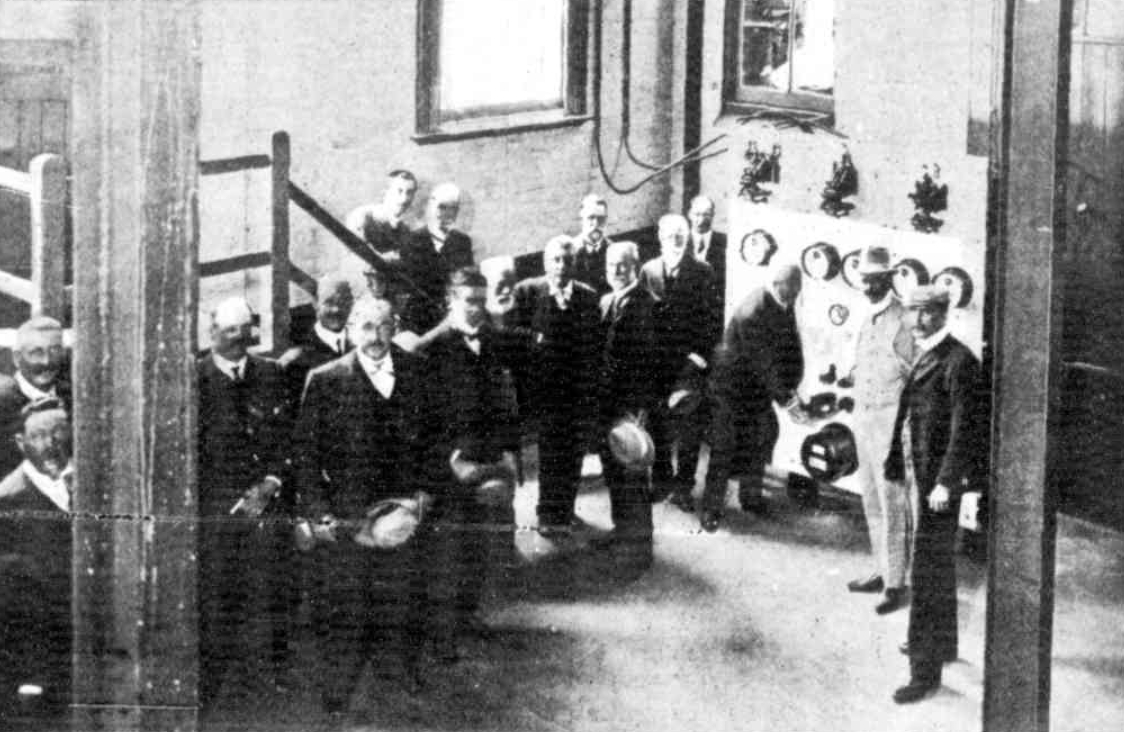
Mayor of North Sydney turning on the electric lighting supply at P.F.A., Kirribilli, using a two-pole knife switch (1909)

=== Electricity supply ===
The generators of the huge meat cold store also supplied electricity—almost certainly direct current—to some customers on the north side of the harbour, from January 1909 until around 1922. In December 1921, P.F.A. were supplying residential and commercial customers in Kirribilli, North Sydney, and Milsons Point. The electricity supply business was operated by a subsidiary company, Northern Sydney Electric Light and Power Supply Corporation.

It also provided street lighting for some of the major streets of North Sydney from 1913 to around 1922. However, P.F.A. failed in its objective to set up a larger power station (and garbage incinerator) to supply all the municipalities on the Lower North Shore, with alternating current electricity, in a similar manner to the Electric Light and Power Supply Corporation, which began operating, at Balmain, in 1909.

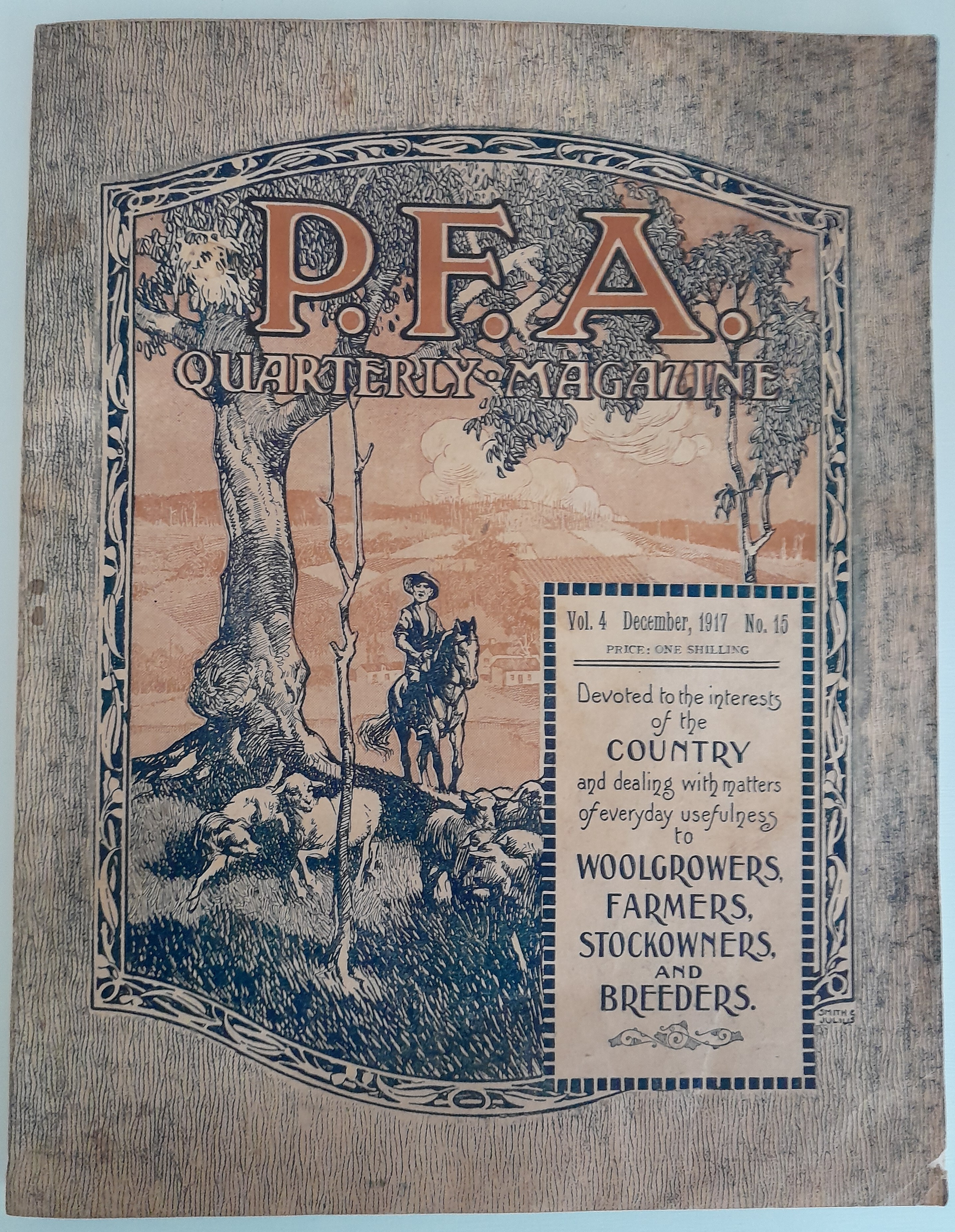
Front cover (December 1917 issue).

=== P.F.A. Quarterly ===
P.F.A. Quarterly was a magazine, first published in June 1914, by Pastoral Finance Association. It was immediately well received. It carried advertising, but was paid by subscription.

The magazine was founded by H.S. Chilton-Young, who became general manager of P.F.A. in 1908, upon the sudden death of the previous general manager. By late 1917, Chilton-Young, although still general manager, was also officially the magazine's editor, but his influence had been perceived from the time of the very first issue.

The magazine self-described its role as, "Devoted to the interests of the Country and dealing with matters of everyday usefulness to Woolgrowers, Farmers, Stockowners and Breeders".

Topics included some of specific interest to those groups, such as articles on developments in agriculture, but the magazine also included articles of more general interest, on other countries and recent events, both in Australia and overseas, a children's page, and a recipes page, known as 'The Good Housewife'. Topics in the December 1917 issue included, among others, 'Wool Handling in Wartime', Newfoundland, the then new Taronga Park Zoo, the newly opened Trans-Australia Railway, and the emerging situation in Russia.

== Thwarted plans for relocation ==
Around the turn of the 20th Century, Sydney was a major wool port, and terminus of a network of railway lines connecting it to wool growing areas. As well as P.F.A.'s store, there were other wool stores, at Ultimo, Pyrmont, Millers Point, Circular Quay, and East Circular Quay.

As the only one of Sydney's wool stores that was on the northern foreshore of Sydney Harbour, impressive as the Kirribilli facility was, it suffered from a lack of direct access to the railway network of New South Wales. While the waterfront site reduced the need for road transport, it still necessitated a degree of double-handling due to transshipment by barge, from the site of the rail yards at Darling Harbour. While not alone in this regard, the operations at Kirribilli were at a disadvantage to those of some other wool stores. Without any road crossing of the harbour, east of Gladesville Bridge—other than by using vehicular ferries—P.F.A. alone was totally dependent upon water transport.

There was some opposition to the presence of the woolstore at Kirribilli, which was a largely residential area. It was seen by some as an eyesore, inappropriate to be alongside Admiralty House, and ruining the view of Kirribilli Point. It is also very likely that the land value of the six-acre site, in an increasingly dense residential area, was also a factor favouring a relocation of the Kirribilli operation.

The company decided to relocate its operations to the southern foreshore, and in 1908 bought a piece of waterfront land on Jones Bay, at Pyrmont. In 1910, the NSW Government resumed the land for the construction of wharves, by the Sydney Harbour Trust. The company disputed the value of compensation that it received, leading to the protracted legal dispute, Pastoral Finance Association v. The Minister. By the time of the final decision from the Privy Council, in the company's favour, the First World War had just begun. The plans for relocation were deferred indefinitely.

== Fire ==
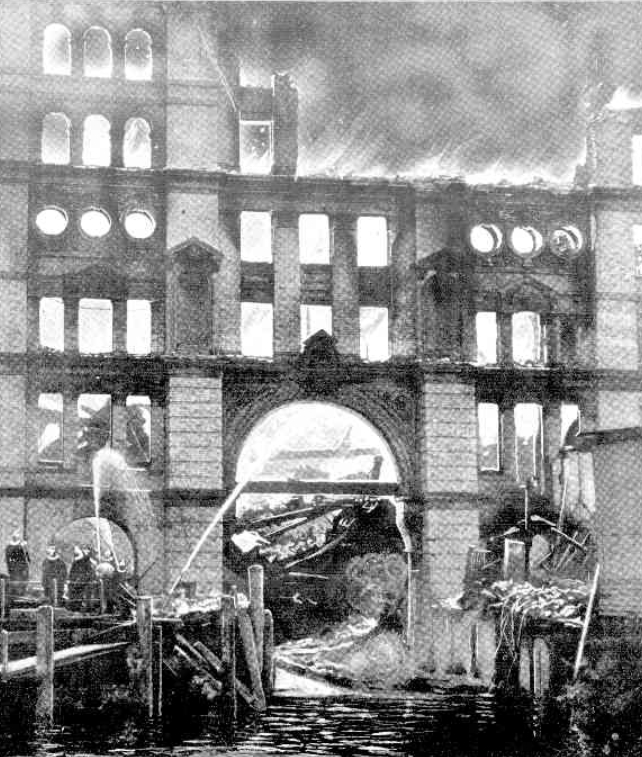
An artist's impression of the fire. It provides an indication of its intensity.

On Tuesday, 13 December 1921, the building at Kirribilli was destroyed by a catastrophic fire. The engine room, compressors and power generation equipment survived, and the wharf remained usable. Some wool was recovered from the ruined buildings, but most of the contents of the building had been destroyed or damaged beyond recovery. The cause of the fire would never be known.

Neighbours noticed the smell of burning wool, at around 6 a.m. on 13 December 1921. At around 7 a.m., Mrs Robertson, wife of the company's engineer, noticed an odour of fire, but initially put it down to garbage being burned. Shortly afterwards, her son ran in and told her that the building was on fire. The fire was initially reported in wool on the second floor from the top at the rear of the building. Two men going to a small storeroom found the wool well alight in the north-eastern corner of the building, at 7:10 a.m. Flames first emerged from windows in the north-eastern corner of the building. Within minutes, certainly by 7:30 a.m., all floors were alight.

The internal structure of the building included wooden floors, which over the years had become coated by inflammable lanolin. As the wooden structure of each floor was consumed by fire and collapsed, wool bales above fell into the raging fire, which gave off a choking dense black smoke.

Around 150 naval personnel came from Garden Island and prevented the fire from spreading to the neighbouring Admiralty House. They also assisted on the northern and eastern side of the building including removing cylinders of ammonia gas from the building, to prevent their exploding. They also took turns to relieve firemen holding fire hose nozzles.

Sydney Harbour Trust fire floats, Pluvius and Hydra, fought the fire from the harbour. The fire brigade from Crows Nest worked to save the engineer's residence. Fire engines, from the city fire brigades, needed to be brought by vehicle ferry, across the harbour, and so only arrived after the fire was well established and the roof of the building had already begun to cave in. Pluvius and Hydra also pumped water up to Campbell Street for firemen working on the rear of the building.

At around 8 a.m. the walls began to collapse, first the southern wall, which showered the water with falling bricks and ironwork, narrowly missing the fire floats. When the southern wall collapsed, falling masonry landed on the freezing works. Then the northern wall along Campbell Street collapsed, and last the side walls. Initially, the day had been windless, but around 9 a.m. a light breeze arose, increasing the danger to nearby houses and flats.

The fire brigade managed to save the electricity generation equipment. There was an interruption to the electricity supply to the P.F.A.'s consumers, but the power supply was restored by 1:30 p.m. on Tuesday, 13 December, while the fire had yet to be extinguished.

Despite the efforts of those fighting the fire, little could be done other than to successfully prevent the fire spreading to nearby houses and flats; the amount of water that could be directed onto the fire was not enough to prevent the almost total destruction of the P.F.A.'s wool store. Even after the worst of the fire had passed, smoke from smoldering wool was a nuisance in the surrounding area. The damage was immense, yet miraculously a small wooden cottage at the south-western corner of the site, merely 20 feet from the wall of the wool store, had survived unscathed. The jetty wharf and the large shed that stood on it also survived.

During the morning of Saturday 17 December, smoke was still rising from the remains of the building. Three-shifts, each of ten firemen for eight hours, had been flooding saltwater onto a huge mass of smouldering wool, the top of which stood level with the third storey windows. A property of wool is that it tends to repel water, meaning that wool covering the smouldering wool prevented the fire being totally extinguished.

On Monday 19 December 1921, the danger of further wall collapses was considered low, the fire at the northern end was extinguished but at the southern end debris was still alight. Conditions were safe enough, and a start was made on removing the huge pile of wool. One complication was that, with the remaining wool in a vast pile, it would not be possible to identify whose wool was whose, and whose wool had been destroyed. By early March 1921, the wool had been removed from the site, but as late as 9 March 1921, timber at the site caught fire and needed the fire brigade to be called.

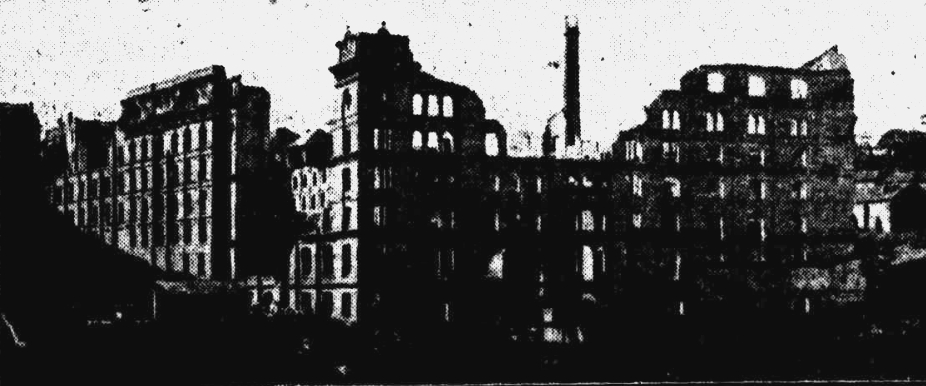
Ruin of the P.F.A. wool store.

Initial reports of the total damage were in the order of from £800,000 to £1,000,000, being around £400,000 for the building itself and another £500,000 to £600,000 for the 32,000 bales of wool—stored there in readiness for upcoming wool auction season—that were thought to have been destroyed by the fire.

With the fire at the Garden Palace, in 1882, and the fire that was called the 'Great Fire of Sydney', in 1890, the P.F.A. fire at Kirribilli ranked as one of the most spectacular building fires in Sydney's history up to that time. As the last of the three fires, it is the only one of the three to have been captured on film.

== Aftermath ==
The company's operations at Kirribilli, of necessity, ceased with the fire. Only the electricity generation resumed for a short time. The focus moved to recovering the losses and paying creditors, many of whom owned wool that had been destroyed or damaged by the fire. The wool store building itself was completely burnt out and its remaining walls were structurally unsound.

In 1922, North Sydney reached agreement with Sydney Municipal Council (the electricity undertaking of the City of Sydney Council) to supply the district of North Sydney Municipal Council with electricity. The electricity supply from P.F.A.'s subsidiary company, Northern Sydney Electric Light and Power Supply Corporation, was scheduled to be switched off on 31 July 1922, but may have continued for a few more weeks due to difficulties connecting consumers to the new supplier. The company's electricity plant was put up for sale by auction, in early September 1922. The liquidation of the subsidiary company took until mid 1924.

It was reported that the building and contents were insured for £400,000, all with one insurance provider, with much of the policy covered by reinsurance. However, the insurance would only cover part of the actual loss. In the event, the insurance payout, in July 1922, was £265,727, from 14 policies with the Atlas Assurance Company. Salvage of wool recovered £280,000. However, there were also £132,275 in other liabilities, exclusive of any amount owed to wool owners. A valuation of the wool held in the store at the time of the fire needed to be made, and was assessed to be £522,608. Consequently, winding up and liquidation of the company was the only way to repay the creditors. In November 1922, a decision on the legal dispute involving the liquidator and the creditors was handed down.

By mid 1924, the liquidator did not expect that there would be any distribution to P.F.A.'s shareholders, but 15 shillings and three pence in the pound had been paid to owners of wool. In 1925, the sale of the freehold land at Kirribilli realised £12,500. The land was sold off in 19 allotments, in 1925, and later redeveloped as blocks of apartments. The business had been bought in January 1922, by New Zealand Loan and Mercantile, with the goodwill realizing another £37,295. There were costs associated with winding down the various business and in salvaging the wool. The total paid to all creditors was £504,118, but this fell short of the total liabilities. The winding up and liquidation of Pastoral Finance Association Limited took until at least 1933.

The P.F.A. Quarterly continued being published, without interruption, but from March 1922 under a new name, N.Z.L. Quarterly. It was still edited by P.F.A.'s former general manager, H.S. Chilton-Young, until his death in 1927. In 1925, the quarterly magazine was renamed The New Nation, and continued to be published, until its last issue in December 1935.

The 1921 P.F.A. fire was not the last spectacular wool store fire in Sydney. In 1935, the Goldsbrough-Mort building in Pyrmont was destroyed by fire, as was the Ultimo building of P.F.A.'s successor, New Zealand Loan & Merchantile, in 1946. Both joined the ranks of Sydney's most spectacular and destructive fires. The causes of these and other wool fires, including numerous wool cargo fires on ships, remained mysterious. Spontaneous combustion of wet wool in compressed bales was a possible cause, but at least in the case of the wool stores, so was a dropped cigarette or an electrical fault.

== Legacy and remnants ==
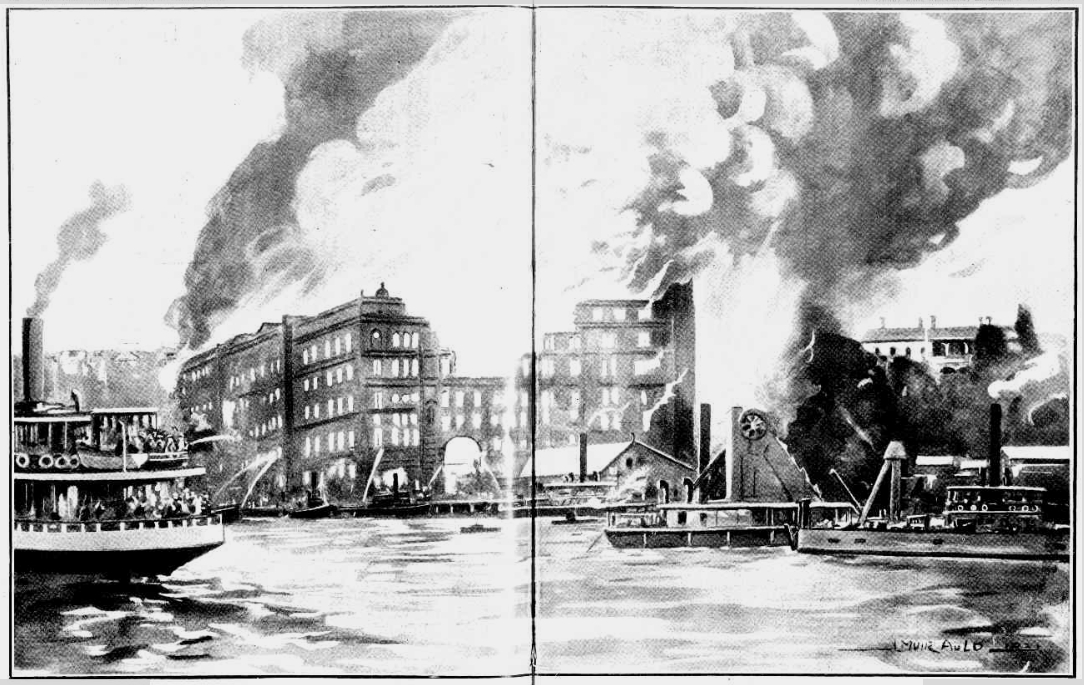
'The Fire Fiend's Thorough Work'

Near the former site of the company's building at Kirribilli, destroyed by fire in 1921, there is a commemorative plaque; it incorrectly states that the fire occurred on 15 December 1921, which was actually two days after the fire broke out. Otherwise, the building can now only be seen in photographic images and in the painting, Kirribilli Point, by Tom Roberts. The land on which the building stood, sold off in 1925, was later redeveloped as blocks of apartments, which still occupy the site.

One issue of P.F.A. Quarterly and two issues of its successor, The New Nation, are held in the collection of the National Library of Australia. The collection of the same library also includes a drawing, portraying the P.F.A. fire, in a newspaper article; it is titled The Fire Fiend's Thorough Work, and is the work of the artist James Muir Auld (1879 – 1942).

The seal of the Pastoral Finance Association and its hand-operated press, once used to emboss the company's documents, is in the collection of the Powerhouse Museum.

The name of the company lives on in an important piece of case law—referred to as the 'special value principle' or 'Pastoral Finance principle'—arising from a 1914 appeal judgement of the Privy Council, in the case, Pastoral Finance Association v. The Minister.
