= Ulster Medical Journal =

- Discipline: General medicine
- Language: English

Publication details
- Former name(s): Transactions of the Ulster Medical Society; Transactions of the Belfast Clinical and Pathological Society
- History: 1854–present

Standard abbreviations
- ISO 4: Ulst. Med. J.

The Ulster Medical Journal is an international general medical journal which publishes contributions on all areas of medical and surgical specialties relevant to a general medical readership. It retains a focus on material relevant to the health of the Northern Ireland population. All manuscripts are independently refereed.

It is owned and published by the Ulster Medical Society, itself founded in 1862 with the amalgamation of the Belfast Medical Society (founded 1806) and the Belfast Clinical and Pathological Society (founded 1853) The Ulster Medical Journal is a successor to the "Transactions of the Ulster Medical Society", published from 1862 to 1929 and, the "Transactions of the Belfast Clinical and Pathological Society", published from 1854 to 1860.

The journal follows guidelines on editorial independence, produced by the World Association of Medical Editors, and the code of good practice of the Committee on Publication Ethics.

== Production ==
The journal is published in January, May and September, by the Ulster Medical Society, and typeset and printed in the UK by Dorman and Sons Ltd, Belfast. Costs for institutional and personal subscriptions are shown on the Subscription page.

== Editors ==
- 2020 - : Michael Trimble (Honorary Assistant Editors: Philip Toner and Ian Wallace)
- 2015-2020 : John Purvis
- 2005-2015 : Patrick Morrison
- 1995-2005 : Mark Gibson
- 1984-1995 : David Hadden
- 1975-1984 : Desmond Montgomery (Co-Editor)
- 1952-1984 : John Morison
- 1948-1951 : Bill Strain (Co-Editor)
- 1943-1951 : Robert Marshall
- 1932-1942 : Richard Hunter

== History ==
The first issue of the Ulster Medical Journal was published on 1 January 1932. The editorial board consisted of the following medical luminaries:

=== Initial Editorial Board ===
Professor W.W.D. Thomson, Professor Andrew Fullerton, Professor R. Johnstone and H.J. Ritchie

=== Initial Acting Editor ===
Richard H. Hunter

== Indexing and citations ==
The full archive of the journal is available in PubMedCentral and the content is indexed in PubMed/Medline.

Current issues and archival material is also available through the Ulster Medical Society website, [www.ums.ac.uk/issue.html].
