= Baron Geddes =

Title in the Peerage of the United Kingdom

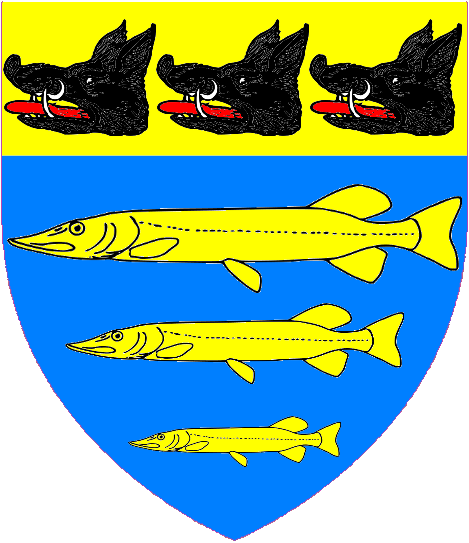
Coat of arms of Baron Geddes

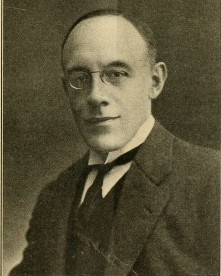
Auckland Geddes, 1st Baron Geddes

Baron Geddes, of Rolvenden in the County of Kent, is a title in the Peerage of the United Kingdom. It was created on 28 January 1942 for the prominent Conservative politician and former Ambassador to the United States, Sir Auckland Geddes. As of 2017 the title is held by his grandson, the third Baron, who succeeded his father in 1975. He is one of the ninety elected hereditary peers that remain in the House of Lords after the passing of the House of Lords Act 1999, and sits on the Conservative benches.

Sir Eric Geddes, British Minister of Munitions and First Lord of the Admiralty during the First World War, was the elder brother of the first Baron.

Margaret Geddes, who married Louis, Prince of Hesse and by Rhine, son of Ernest Louis, Grand Duke of Hesse, was the daughter of the first Baron.

The family seat is in Steeple Ashton, Wiltshire.

== Barons Geddes (1942) ==
- Auckland Campbell Geddes, 1st Baron Geddes (1879–1954)
- Ross Campbell Geddes, 2nd Baron Geddes (1907–1975)
- Euan Michael Ross Geddes, 3rd Baron Geddes (born 1937)

The heir apparent is the present holder's son the Hon. James George Neil Geddes (born 1969).
The heir apparent's heir apparent is his son Angus Ross Alexander Geddes (born 2005).

== Arms ==
Coat of arms of Baron Geddes
Crest A Scots pine tree growing out of a mound all Proper. Escutcheon Azure three geds naiant Or on a chief of the last as many boars’ heads couped Sable armed Argent langued Gules. Supporters On a compartment semé of sea-pinks two geds Proper. Motto Capta Majora
