= Ged, Louisiana =

Unincorporated community in Louisiana, U.S.

Coordinates: 30°08′23″N 093°35′34″W

Ged is an unincorporated community in Calcasieu Parish, southwestern Louisiana, in the United States. It is located between Ged Lake and the Vinton Drainage Canal, and immediately south of the Vinton Oil Field. Ged's elevation is 10 feet above sea level. The town of Vinton, Louisiana, is 3.6 miles (5.8 km) north of Ged.
