= John Henry Geddes =

Australian businessperson

John Henry Geddes (1855–1909)—always better known as J.H. Geddes—was an Australian businessperson from Sydney, New South Wales, Australia. He established the company that became Pastoral Finance Association, Limited. He later had business ventures in Queensland and in England. He promoted the Wolseley sheep-shearing machine to Australian woolgrowers, was a pioneer, albeit an unsuccessful one, of oyster farming on Georges River, and was associated with refrigerated meat exports from Australia. He was, briefly, an alderman of Sydney City Council, during 1886.

Geddes was born on 21 April 1855. He was the son of Irish-born John Geddes (1823–1894) and his wife, Rachael nee Simpson. His father was originally a fellmonger at Camperdown, but later a wool broker who also ran a wool scouring business, at what is now Bunnerong Road, Botany.

John Geddes handed over day-to-day management of the wool scour and tannery business to two of his sons, Alexander and John Henry. In 1880, they expanded it, by acquiring the Floodvale wool scouring works. Under the trading name, A. & J.H. Geddes, by 1881, they were employing 100 men and processing 80 to 100 bales of wool per day. By 1885, Geddes was in charge of the business by himself, leading to his becoming key to the establishment of the company, in 1890, that would become Pastoral Finance Association, Limited (P.F.A.). In 1885, it expanded its business to include wool auctions and other produce sales, from its warehouse in Phillip Street, Sydney.

In May 1890, a decision was taken to incorporate the venture as, J. H. Geddes and Co., The Pastoralists' Association, Limited. Land with a water frontage had been secured at Kirribilli, and a board of directors nominated, with J.H. Geddes as managing director. Its other shareholders were mainly leading pastoralists, and from the outset had the nature of a cooperative. The chairman of the board was George Cox (1824–1901) and the vice-chairman was Russell Barton (1830–1916).

The new company began work on excavations for a new warehouse facility, in Kirribilli, around May 1890. The keystone of the building was officially laid in a ceremony in December 1890, and the new facility was officially opened in October 1891. The company also provided finance to pastoralists, using funds that the company would borrow from English sources.

Later, the company amalgamated with two other ventures—Pastoral Finance Trust and Agency Company of Australasia, Limited—and the name of the combined entity changed to J.H. Geddes and Co., the Pastoral Finance Association, Limited. In 1894, J.H. Geddes severed his connection with the company, selling his shares, and the company's name changed to its final form, Pastoral Finance Association, Limited (P.F.A.). Barton became chairman after Cox's death in 1901, and was briefly managing director in 1902.

Geddes was credited with introducing and promoting the advantages of the Wolseley sheep-shearing machine—invented by Frederick Wolseley—to Australian woolgrowers, resulting in a huge increase in productivity over former hand shearing practice.

Geddes was an advocate for oyster farming, during the 1880s. He took up large oyster leases in Port Hacking, an estuary too saline to allow Sydney rock oysters to grow to marketable size. Around 1888, he translocated 100 bags of small oysters from Port Hacking, to his other leases on the Georges River estuary at Lime Kiln Bay, for fattening. However, that was soon after mudworm became a serious problem in the Georges River estuary, and the venture failed. He sold his leases at Lime Kiln Bay, which were later successfully operated by the Matthei family. Translocation of immature oysters and spat to the Georges River estuary later became fundamental to the growth of the oyster farming industry there, which survived until 2023.

He saw the rapid progress In the export of refrigerated meat from New Zealand and became an advocate of increasing the trade from Australia—particularly in mutton—something which became pressing as Australia entered the long Federation drought. A cargo of frozen mutton and beef was loaded onto the refrigerated steamship, Star of Victoria, destined for London in June 1894. However, having achieved his objective, he apparently fell out with his co-directors. Although P.F.A. believed that it had covered his expenses while he promoted that scheme in England, the board came to understand that he had already began working on behalf of a new venture, with Birt & Co. He was also exploring the opportunities in German and other continental markets for frozen meat exports from Australia, but such opportunities were diminished by protection of those markets.

In 1894, he sold his shares in P.F.A., and severed all connections with it; an obituary described the circumstances as follows, "A man of indomitable energy and perseverance, he [Geddes] like most men of his temperament, was never supremely happy except when he had complete control of the work in which he was engaged, and that hankering for supreme control resulted in misunderstandings and ended by his selling out of the company".

He then changed his focus to Queensland, where he set up the company, J. H. Geddes, Birt, and Co.. His efforts resulted in a line of refrigerated steamers of (Birt and Co.), a freezing works at Hemmant, and freezing storage at South Brisbane. However, he also severed his connection with that new company, which reverted to be Birt & Co.. Moving to England, he set up four successful ventures there, London Markets Cold Storage Company, Imperial Food Supplies, Limited, Austral, Limited, and the General Produce Company, Limited.

Geddes married Haidee Lone Wilshire 1865 - 1946), at Holy Trinity church, Berrima, on 26 November 1885. Together, they had four daughters and two sons.

He died on 22 March 1909 at Folkestone, Kent, England.

Summarising his life and business career, an obituary stated, "Although he did not at all times work in complete harmony with his co-partners in the Australian companies originated by him—due mostly to his excess of energy—he worked unceasingly in the interests of the Australian producers." Another observer opined that he, "in addition, was a born organiser. A brilliant man in everything he connected himself with, and his character may be summed up by the remark of one who knew him all his life that he only just missed genius. He was ambitious and enterprising to a very marked degree, and like many more men of marked ability and great capacity, he fretted at having to moderate his pace to that of more slow-going individuals. Personally, he was an ideal comrade, open and generous to a fault, and all through his life he was ever ready to assist any who appealed to him. He gave away vast sums of money without fanfare or seeking recognition in his quiet unostentatious manner".
