= Euan Geddes, 3rd Baron Geddes =

British Conservative peer and politician

Lieutenant Commander The Right Honourable The Lord Geddes
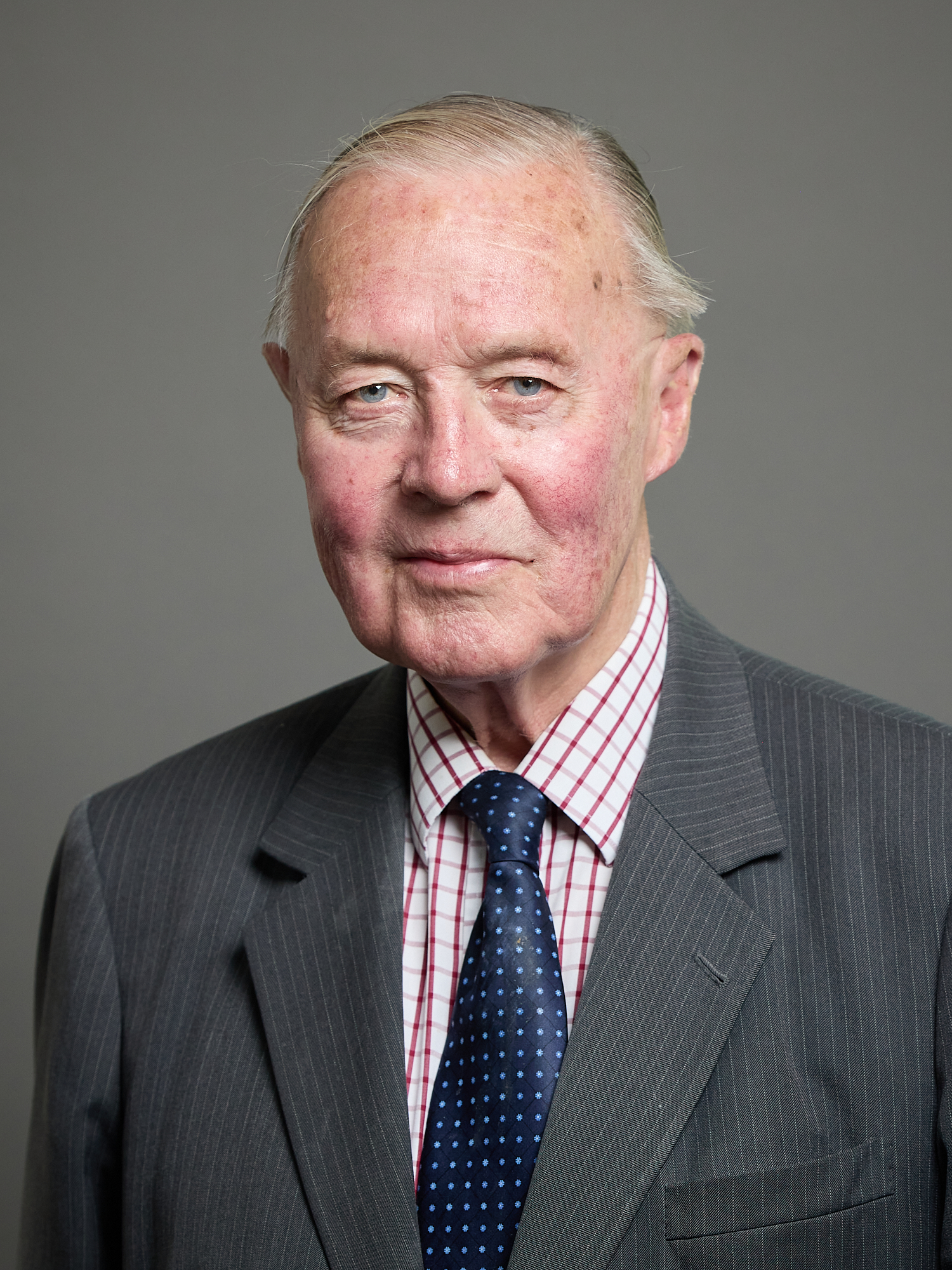
- Official portrait, 2025

Member of the House of Lords
- Lord Temporal
- Hereditary peerage 20 March 1975 – 11 November 1999
- Preceded by: The 2nd Baron Geddes
- Succeeded by: Seat abolished
- Elected Hereditary Peer; 11 November 1999 – 29 April 2026
- Election: 1999
- Preceded by: Seat established
- Succeeded by: Seat abolished

Personal details
- Born: 3 September 1937 (age 89)
- Party: Conservative
- Spouses: Gillian Butler (m. 1966; died 1995) Susan Margaret Carter (after 1996)
- Education: Rugby School
- Alma mater: Gonville and Caius College, Cambridge; Harvard Business School

Euan Michael Ross Geddes, 3rd Baron Geddes (born 3 September 1937) is a British hereditary peer, politician and former deputy speaker of the House of Lords.

== Early life and education ==
Geddes is the son of the 2nd Baron Geddes and the former Enid Mary Butler, only child of Clarence Henry Butler, of Tenterden.

He was educated at Rugby School, then an all-boys public school (i.e. an independent boarding school) in Warwickshire. He studied history at Gonville and Caius College, Cambridge, where he graduated as a Bachelor of Arts (BA) in 1961; as per tradition, his BA was later promoted to a Master of Arts (MA Cantab) degree. He was further educated at Harvard Business School in 1969.

== Career ==
=== Military service ===
Geddes served in the Royal Navy from 1956 to 1958. On 3 September 1958, he transferred to the Supply Branch of the Royal Naval Reserve with the rank of sub lieutenant. He was promoted to lieutenant on 3 September 1961, and to lieutenant-commander on 3 September 1969. He was placed on the retired list on 30 November 1971.

=== Civilian career ===
Geddes was development manager, P&O Bulk Shipping. He was deputy manager of P&O Asia (Hong Kong) between 1975 and 1977. Since 1992, he has been chair of the Trinity College, London and since 2000 of Chrome Castle Limited. He is further director of the Trinity College of Music.

=== House of Lords ===
He succeeded to his father's title, Baron Geddes, in 1975.

He was one of the ninety hereditary peers selected to remain in the House of Lords after the House of Lords Act 1999. Since 2002, Lord Geddes was a deputy speaker of the House of Lords.

== Personal life ==
Lord Geddes has been married twice, first to Gillian Butler in 1966 and, after her death in 1995, to Susan Margaret Carter in 1996. He has two children by his first wife, one daughter, Margaret Clair Geddes Crawford and one son, his heir James George Neil Geddes.

Coat of arms of Euan Geddes, 3rd Baron Geddes
Crest A Scots pine tree growing out of a mound all Proper. Escutcheon Azure three geds naiant Or on a chief of the last as many boars' heads couped Sable armed Argent langued Gules. Supporters On a compartment semé of sea-pinks two geds Proper. Motto Capta Majora

Peerage of the United Kingdom
Preceded by Ross Geddes	Baron Geddes; 1975–present Member of the House of Lords (1975–1999)	Incumbent; Heir apparent: Hon. James Geddes
Parliament of the United Kingdom
New office created by the House of Lords Act 1999	Elected hereditary peer to the House of Lords under the House of Lords Act 1999; 1999–2026	Office abolished under the House of Lords (Hereditary Peers) Act 2026
