= Ged (heraldry) =

Heraldic animal

Crest badge of Clan Ged. The ged's head used in the badge is a pun on the clan-name, and is an example of canting arms.

A ged is a heraldic term for the fish known in English as a pike. It is often used in "canting" coats; that is, using coats of arms to make a pun on the last name of the bearer, one of his titles, a nickname, or the name of his estate. The word ged is derived from the Old Norse gaddr (spike). The Norse word is the origin of the terms for pike in the modern North Germanic languages: Swedish: gädda, Danish: gedde, Norwegian: gjedde, and the Faroese and Icelandic: gedda.
