= Margaret Geddes =

Margaret Geddes may refer to:

- Margaret Geddes (writer) (born 1949), an Australian writer, journalist and historian
- Margaret Geddes (artist) (1914 – 1998), a British artist
- Margaret Campbell Geddes (1913 – 1997), British noble and Princess of Hesse and by Rhine
