= Geddes House =

Historic house in Nairn, Scotland

Coordinates: 57°33′3″N 3°52′1″W

The Geddes House is a Georgian Neoclassical style building near Nairn, Scotland. It was built in 1780 for George Mackintosh and is currently self-catering accommodation.
