= Geddes, Highland =

Coordinates: 57°32′40″N 3°51′30″W

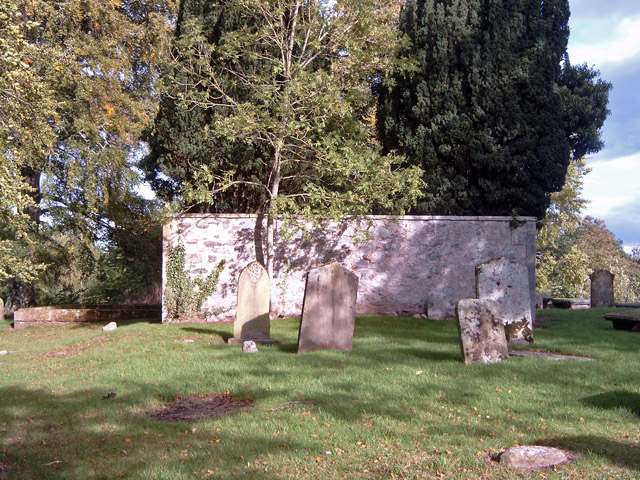
Geddes old church and graveyard, Nairnshire

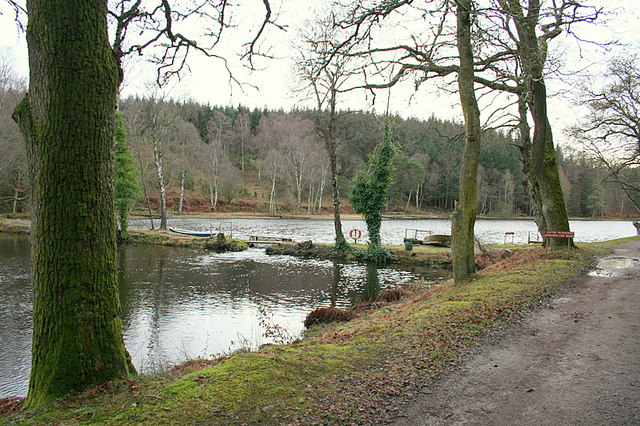
Geddes trout fishery

Geddes (Scottish Gaelic: Geadais) is a small village located 5 km to the south of Nairn, in the Highland council area of Scotland.

== Geddes House ==
Geddes House was built by William Mackintosh, a nabob who made a fortune in India, and in 1822 following Mackintosh's death, the estate passed to William Mackintosh the 2nd who made further improvements and alterations.

== Wildlife ==
The area's woods and open fields are home to many types of birds, including buzzards and eagles. One of the reasons the population is so high may be because the Forestry Commission and local farmers own most of the land. Unlike traditional estates, they have no interest in reducing or managing the local bird populations. The area also supports populations of deer, foxes, badgers, and moles. Some of the forested land is used for shooting and pheasant breeding by private owners but is open to the public when not in use.

== Employment ==
The village is located in a traditionally agricultural area surrounded by agricultural land. This may change as Nairn and Inverness expand possibly consuming the area with infill from the two towns. Most people of working age commute elsewhere to work but the Geddes Fishery employs a small number of local people. A high percentage of the people in the area are not of working age and are either retired or semi-retired.
