= Pytt Geddes =

Norwegian responsible for bringing tai chi to the UK (1917-2006)

Gerda ("Pytt") Geddes (born Gerda Meyer Bruun; 17 July 1917 – 4 March 2006) was responsible for bringing tai chi to the UK. She taught classes at The Place in London.

She was born in Bergen, Norway, the daughter of Gerdt Henrik Meyer Bruun, a successful businessman and politician who served in the Norwegian government as Minister of Trade. During World War II, she joined the Norwegian resistance movement.

After she and David Geddes married in 1948, they moved to Shanghai, where she discovered tai chi. Soon after, the People's Liberation Army took power there. Around 1951, they were able to move to Hong Kong, where she studied Yang Style Tai Chi (楊氏太极拳) with Cai Hepeng - Choy Hak Pang(蔡鹤朋), and then with his son Cai JinwenChoy Kam Man (蔡锦汶).

She became a friend of Benjamin Britten and Peter Pears.

She studied psychology in the US and underwent Reichian analysis in Oslo.

== Selected publications ==
- Geddes, Gerda (1991). Looking for the Golden Needle: An Allegorical Journey. MannaMedia. ISBN 978-1872606019.
