= Geddes Axe =

Major UK government spending cuts in the 1920s

The Geddes Axe was the drive for public economy and retrenchment in UK government expenditure recommended in the 1920s by a Committee on National Expenditure chaired by Sir Eric Geddes, with Lord Inchcape, Lord Faringdon, Sir Joseph Maclay and Sir Guy Granet as the other members.

== Background ==
During and after the Great War, government expenditure and taxation increased. Taxation per head per annum was £18 in 1919; £22 in 1920; and £24 in 1921. In 1913–14 the Civil Services and Revenue Departments cost £81.3 million; in 1920–21 they cost £523.3 million; and in 1921–22 they cost £590.7 million. The Armed Forces cost around £77 million in the year before the War and approaching £190 million in 1921–22. Similarly, the National Debt and other Consolidated Fund Services increased over the same time from £37.3 million to £359.8 million.

In 1921, the Anti-Waste League was formed by Lord Rothermere to campaign against what it considered to be wasteful government expenditure. Three of its candidates won by-elections from government supporters between February and June 1921. In May 1921, HM Treasury sent all government departments a circular stating that, in 1921–22, the cost of Supply Services would be £603 million, which should be reduced in the next financial year to £490 million—economies totalling £113 million. However, the response was a plan to reduce this expenditure by only £75 million. The Prime Minister, David Lloyd George, appointed Geddes as head of a committee in August 1921 to find where cuts could be found in various government departments for 1922–23. The committee's terms of reference were:

To make recommendations to the Chancellor of the Exchequer for effecting forthwith all possible reductions in the National Expenditure on Supply Services, having regard especially to the present and prospective position of the Revenue. Insofar as questions of policy are involved in the expenditure under discussion, these will remain for the exclusive consideration of the Cabinet; but it will be open to the Committee to review the expenditure and to indicate the economies which might be effected if particular policies were either adopted, abandoned or modified.

Sometime after its appointment, the Chancellor, Sir Robert Horne, requested that the committee find how expenditure could be reduced by £175 million, which meant a total expenditure of £428 million. The committee's reports were shown to the Cabinet in December 1921 and January 1922. Cabinet committees reviewed and modified them before publication in February. Three Reports were published:

- First Interim Report of Committee on National Expenditure. (Cmd. 1581. Pp. 172.)
- Second Interim Report of Committee on National Expenditure. (Cmd. 1582. Pp. 113.)
- Third Interim Report of Committee on National Expenditure. (Cmd. 1589. Pp. 170.)

== The Axe ==
The Reports advocated economies totalling £87 million, but the Cabinet decided on savings amounting to £52 million. Total defence expenditure fell to £111 million in 1922–23 from £189.5 million in 1921–22, and total social spending (education, health, housing, pensions, unemployment) fell from £205.8 million in 1920–21 to £182.1 million in 1922–23.

After 1922–23, defence spending increased to £114.7 million in 1924–25, and social spending, after dipping to £175.5 million in 1923–24, increased to £177.4 million in 1924–25.

== As a metaphor ==
Geddes Axe may have been the first use of the term axe as a metaphor for financial cuts. The earliest citations in the Oxford English Dictionary for axe used in that sense are all in the context of the Geddes Axe. The very earliest use identified was in the Glasgow Herald in October 1922. It was also used in The Times in March 1923 in an article concerning the limit of safety of army cuts: "No fewer than 1,500 officers had fallen before the Geddes axe."

For a time, the term Geddes Axe became a metaphor for any change that improved efficiency or increased simplicity. For instance, Rupert Gould in The Marine Chronometer (1923) wrote,

The necessity for its maker, if he wishes to remain in business, to produce an efficient machine which shall at the same time be cheap, and therefore must be as simple as possible, has acted as a kind of "Geddes' Axe," sweeping away a number of inessential contrivances...

— Rupert T. Gould
