= Eric Geddes =

British businessman and Conservative politician (1875–1937)

The Right Honourable Sir Eric Geddes GCB GBE
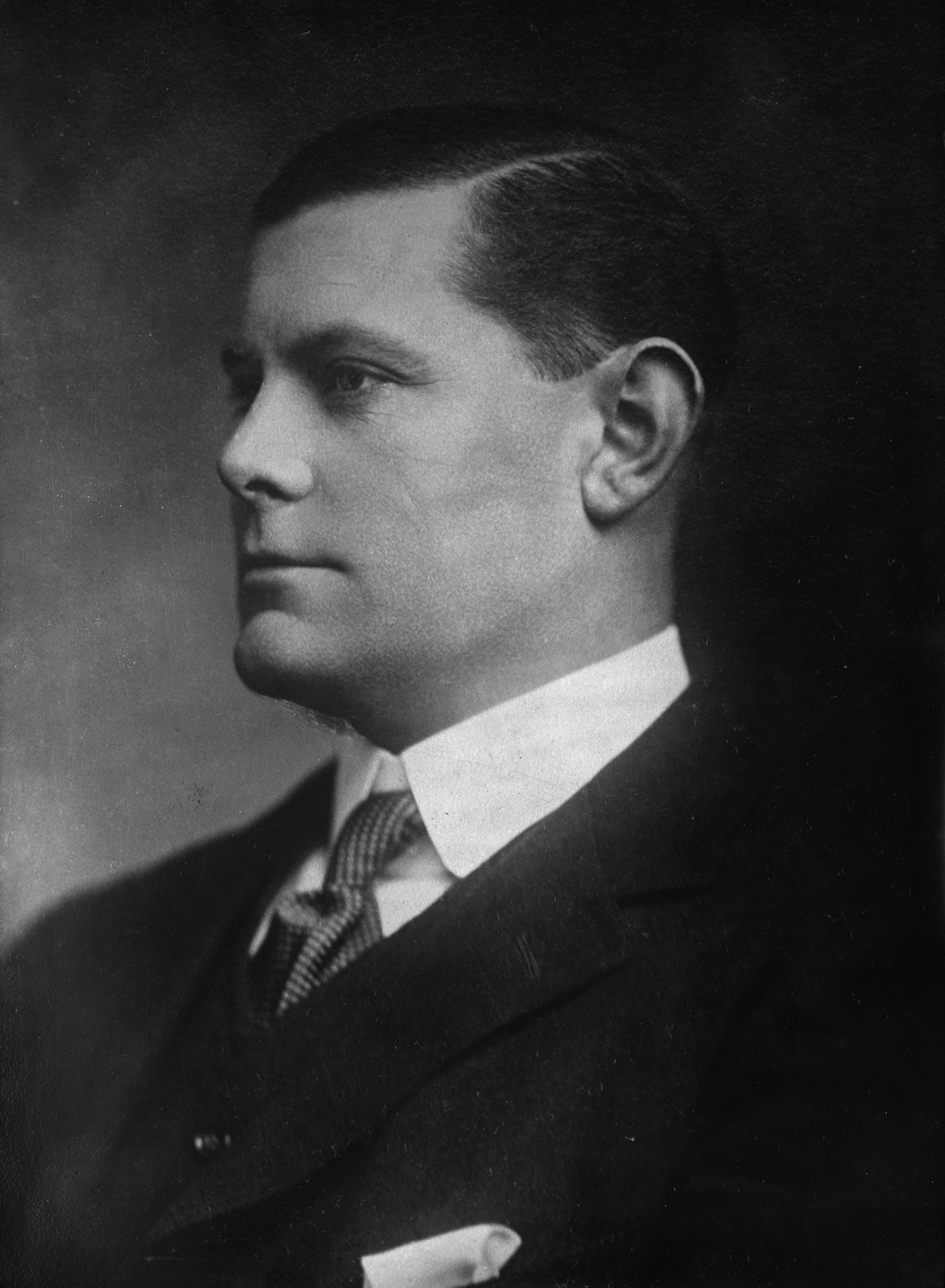

First Lord of the Admiralty
- In office 17 July 1917 – 10 January 1919
- Monarch: George V
- Prime Minister: David Lloyd George
- Preceded by: Sir Edward Carson
- Succeeded by: Walter Long

Minister of Transport
- In office 19 May 1919 – 7 November 1921
- Monarch: George V
- Prime Minister: David Lloyd George
- Preceded by: New office
- Succeeded by: The Viscount Peel

Personal details
- Born: 26 September 1875 British India
- Died: 22 June 1937 (aged 61)
- Party: Conservative
- Spouse: Gwendolen Stokes
- Relatives: Mona Chalmers Watson (sister); Auckland Geddes (brother)

Sir Eric Campbell Geddes (26 September 1875 – 22 June 1937) was a British businessman and Conservative politician. With a background in railways, he served as head of Military Transportation on the Western Front, with the rank of major-general. He then served as First Lord of the Admiralty (with the rank of vice-admiral, despite its being a political position) between 1917 and 1919. He then served as the first Minister of Transport between 1919 and 1921, in which position he was responsible for the deep public spending cuts known as the "Geddes Axe".

== Background and education ==
Born in British India, Geddes was a son of Auckland Campbell Geddes, of Edinburgh, Scotland. Among his siblings were Dr. Mona Chalmers Watson and Auckland Geddes, 1st Baron Geddes. He was educated at Oxford Military College and Merchiston Castle School, Edinburgh, until asked to leave.

== Business career ==
Geddes then spent 2½ years drifting between jobs like lumberjack and steelworker in the United States, eventually becoming a stationmaster for the Baltimore and Ohio Railroad, rising to car-tracer. When he abruptly returned home, his elder sister gave him a firm talking-to. Late in 1895 he was sent to India for a minor job in estate management, where he built light railways before moving to the Rohilkund and Kumaon railway; he became superintendent in 1901. Returning to England because of his wife's poor health, he joined the North Eastern Railway (NER), in 1904 to become the NER's claims agent (a newly created position) and rose to be deputy chief goods manager in 1906, chief goods manager in 1907, and finally deputy general manager in 1911. His initial NER salary was £500 per year, and by the time that he left in 1915, had increased to £5,000 per year; and he received a golden handshake of £50,000 at the end of the war. He was briefly considered as a possible chairman of the London and North Eastern Railway when that was formed at the end of 1922, but the choice fell to William Whitelaw.

== Political career ==
During the First World War Geddes was one of the "men of push and go" brought into government service by Minister of Munitions David Lloyd George. In 1915 Geddes was selected by Lloyd George and given the title of deputy director general of munitions supply, whereupon he left the NER. Made responsible for small arms production, he established rational goals for rifles, light and heavy machine guns, and production then soared, making many more automatic weapons than the army had requested. Shell production was also booming but these were not adequately getting filled with explosive, and so Geddes was made responsible for them in December 1916; within six months the number of filled shells increased tenfold to two million per week, and the filled shells piled up on French docks. Lloyd George, now Minister of War, persuaded Sir Douglas Haig, Commander of the British Expeditionary Force, to invite Geddes and his three-man team over for two days in August 1916 to advise on transportation. Haig was so impressed that the visit was extended to a month and then Geddes was appointed Director General of Military Railways and Inspector-General of Transportation with the rank of major general. They got the ports and railways working efficiently and built light railways to bring materials to the front. He was knighted in 1916 and appointed a Knight Commander of the Order of the Bath and Knight Grand Cross of the Order of the British Empire in 1917. He was promoted to inspector general of transportation in all theatres of war.

The German U-boat campaign unleashed unrestricted attacks in February 1917. As the British merchant fleet was suffering, Lloyd George transferred Geddes to the Admiralty as Controller with the honorary rank of vice-admiral. He was given control of British shipbuilding, charged with making up for as many of the losses as possible. He found the Admiralty in disarray and wrote to his friend Field Marshal Haig about the lack of drive. On 19 June 1917 First Sea Lord Jellicoe confessed to the War Cabinet that they were losing. Haig and Geddes breakfasted with Lloyd George to demand a new administration in the Admiralty.

On 6 July 1917 Geddes, strongly recommended by Haig, returned to civilian life as First Lord of the Admiralty. To serve he had to be a member of the House of Commons and was elected in a by-election for Cambridge. He was sworn into the Privy Council the same month. The Daily Telegraph's naval correspondent, Sir Archibald Hurd, later wrote of Geddes and Lloyd George, "No men more ignorant of naval affairs were ever associated together than the Prime Minister and Geddes". Convoying was turning the tide. Geddes appointed the Belfast shipbuilder Lord Pirrie as controller-general of merchant shipbuilding, and brought William Henry Bragg into the Admiralty to oversee anti-submarine science: they worked with the French to develop sonar which was ready just when the war ended. Jellicoe was replaced at the end of 1917. Convoys in home waters lost only 1.25 percent of their ships, and 2,084,000 American soldiers reached Europe; only 113 were lost to U-boats, despite the German Admiralty's boast that they would destroy them all. At war's end the world supply of shipping was larger than it had been at the outset, thanks to the growth of the Japanese and American merchant fleets. It was a great Allied victory.

Lloyd George's evaluation was that Geddes was "... one of the most remarkable men which the State called to its aid ..." He left the Admiralty in January 1919 and was made a Knight Grand Cross of the Order of the Bath. Lloyd George then asked him to organise a new Ministry of Transport. Until the bill setting up this new office was passed in May 1919, Geddes remained in the cabinet as minister without portfolio. In May 1919, he was appointed the first Minister of Transport. The new ministry was given control over railways, roads, canals and docks, but was criticised in both houses of parliament for giving in to nationalisation and for its large size. In the autumn of 1921, the handing back of the railways to the companies after state control was being reviewed, which put the Ministry of Transport under further pressure. Geddes had neither taste nor aptitude for political infighting, and resigned in November 1921.

== Austerity programme ==
In 1921, Geddes chaired the Committee on National Expenditure, which proposed heavy cuts in public expenditure to match falling national income. The austerity policy became known as the Geddes Axe. A notable feature of the recommendations were a cut in army personnel by 50,000 men from 210,000, and a cut in funding by £20 million from an existing army estimate of £75 million.

The various expenditure cuts depressed the economy further. Geddes resigned from the government and the Commons in 1922, becoming director of Dunlop Rubber. From 1924 until his death, he was chairman of Imperial Airways.

== Family ==
Geddes married Gwendolen, daughter of Reverend A. Stokes, in 1900. They had three sons, including Sir Reay Geddes, who became chairman of the Dunlop Rubber Company. Eric Geddes died in June 1937, at the age of 61, after several years of declining health.

Military offices
Preceded by New title	Controller of the Navy; 1917	Succeeded by Sir Alan Anderson
Parliament of the United Kingdom
Preceded by Almeric Paget	Member of Parliament for Cambridge; 1917–1922	Succeeded by Sir George Newton
Political offices
Preceded by Sir Edward Carson	First Lord of the Admiralty; 1917–1919	Succeeded by Walter Long
Preceded by Austen Chamberlain	Minister without Portfolio; 1919	Vacant Title next held by Sir Laming Worthington-Evans, Bt
New title	Minister of Transport; 1919–1921	Succeeded by The Viscount Peel
