= The Patrician's Dream =

Painting by Bartolomé Esteban Murillo

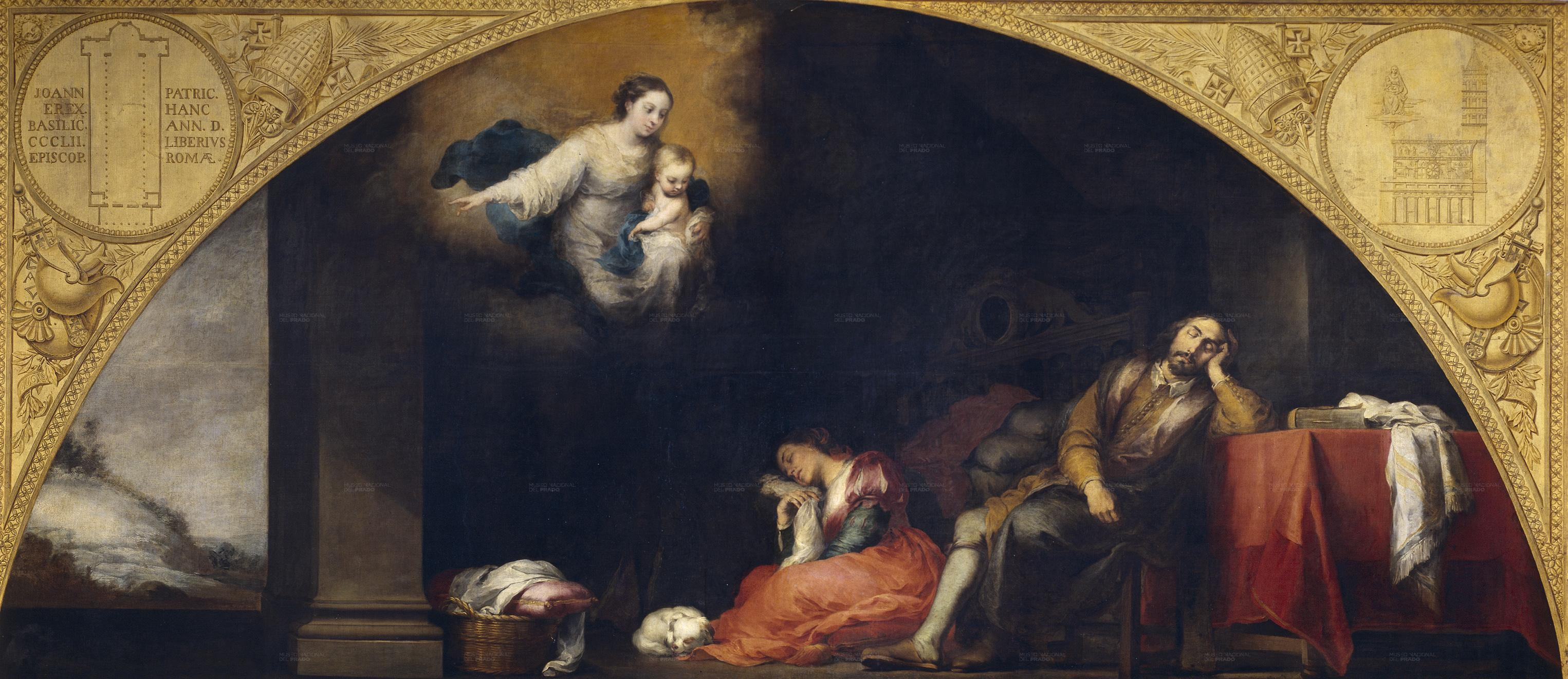

The Patrician's Dream or The Foundation of Santa Maria Maggiore in Rome I: The Dream of Patrician John is a 1665 oil on canvas painting by Bartolome Murillo. It has been in the Museo del Prado since 1901.

It originally formed a pair with John the Patrician and his Wife Revealing their Dream to Pope Liberius (also in the Prado), together telling of the story behind the foundation of Santa Maria Maggiore in Rome, with two small pendents of The Immaculate Conception (Louvre) and The Triumph of the Eucharist (Faringdon collection, Buscot Park). The set was produced for the church of Santa María la Blanca in Seville - originally a synagogue it had been remodelled between 1662 and 1665 to commemorate pope Alexander VII's Apostolic Constitution Sollicitudo omnium ecclesiarum instituting the feast of the Immaculate Conception. The two main works were looted by Marshal Soult for the Napoleon Museum, before being returned to Spain 1816, upon which they were initially placed in the Real Academia de Bellas Artes de San Fernando.
