= Geddes Hyslop =

British architect

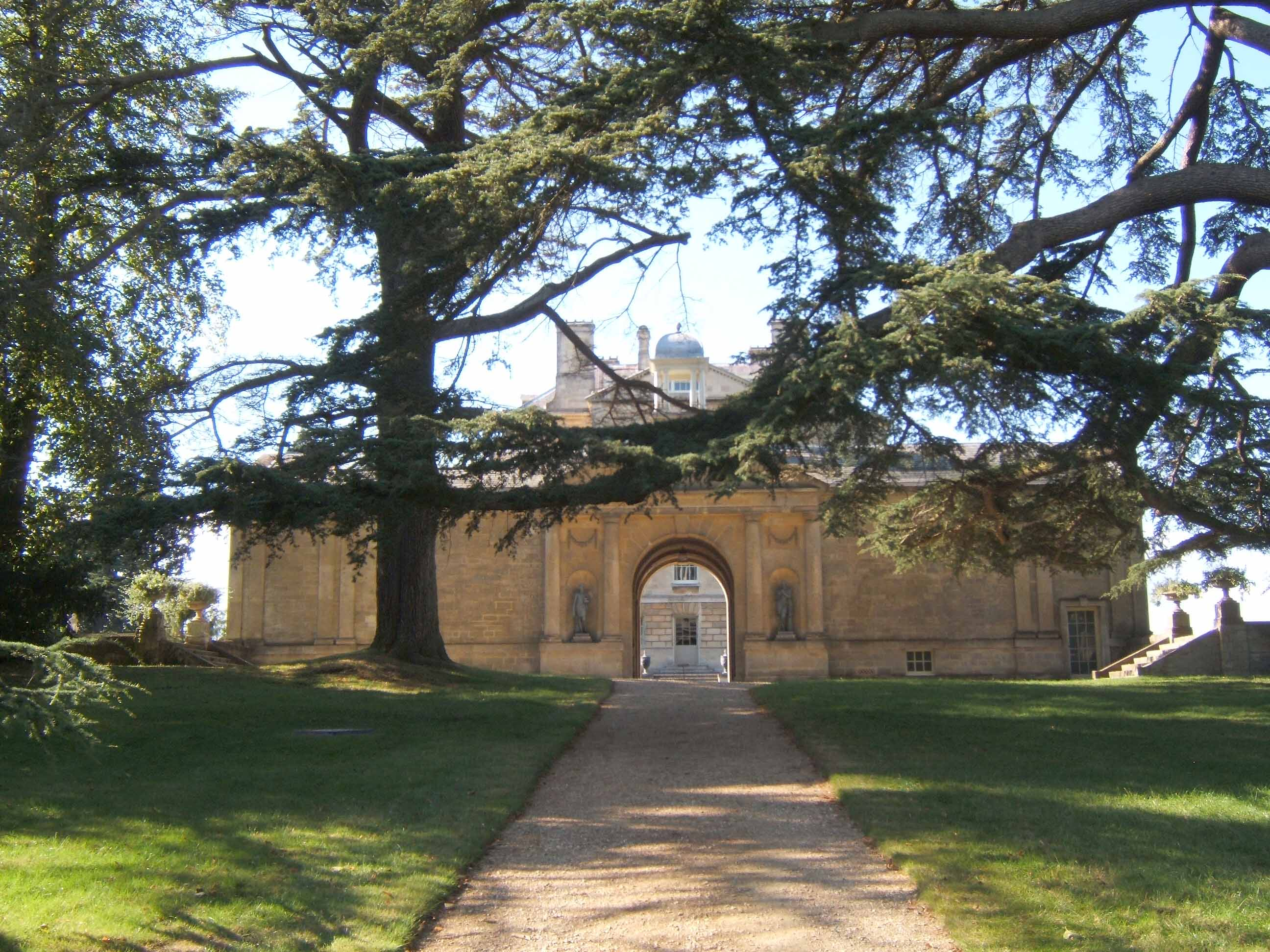
Buscot Park: one of the two classical flanking wings designed by Geddes Hyslop in 1934

Charles Geddes Clarkson Hyslop (29 December 1900 – 13 November 1988) was a 20th-century British architect, trained at the British School at Rome. Linked with the Bloomsbury set, his work, mostly in the classical style, was fashionable among the British upper classes and intelligentsia in the years immediately surrounding World War II. He is remembered today as a restorer of country houses and a designer of knowledgeable pastiches.

== Architecture ==
Hyslop began his architectural career during the early 1930s. His connections with the Bloomsbury Set and a circle of friends, which included such Victoria Sackville-West, Harold Nicolson and James Lees-Milne, ensured his access to the leading society patrons and aesthetes of the day.

One of his earliest works, in 1933, was on the St. Helier estate, a new planned community, extending Morden, Surrey, to the south and east. Geddes designed the community's modernistic brick Bishop Andrewe's Church, Wigmore Road.

In 1934, The 2nd Lord Faringdon employed Hyslop to remodel Buscot Park and restore it to an approximation of an 18th-century appearance. This was achieved by removing the 19th-century extensions and alterations which obscured the clean and simple lines of the neoclassical house. To restore some of the space lost by the demolition of a large wing, Hyslop created two flanking pavilions in a classical style, "which suit the house to perfection", John Julius Norwich observed, with temple fronts to the south and north. The pavilions and house were given a unified composition by linking high box hedging, complete with topiary pilasters. The interior of the mansion received a similar treatment: Victorian decoration was removed and 18th-century ceilings, fireplaces and motifs were acquired and installed. Small rooms were merged to accentuate the sense of light and space needed to accommodate Lord Faringdon's large political houseparties.

At Buscot, and in smaller neo-Georgian settings, Hyslop introduced actual Georgian fittings. At Great Swifts, near Cranbrook, Kent, a neo-Georgian house that Hyslop designed for MP Victor Cazalet about 1936, he installed an early 18th-century staircase from Tangier House, Taunton, and brought in fine wall panelling from Ashley Park, Walton-on-Thames, and a rococo chimneypiece from a house at Blackheath, London.

During World War II Major Hyslop, Royal Engineers, as he was commissioned, saw service in North Africa, where he headed up the Antiquities Department of British forces in 1944–45. He was employed converting Greenlands, Hambleden, Buckinghamshire as a Government administrative staff college in 1945, occasioning the loss of some apparently not-very-characteristic or notable interior work by Norman Shaw; the commission was extended to include conversion of the north range to dormitory bedrooms in 1946, the conversion of the stable block to a library in 1951, and development of a freestanding dormitory on a butterfly-wing-plan, with a "bold flying staircase", in 1955.

Hyslop's preference for working in the classical styles was severely tested in the years of austerity and building restrictions immediately following World War II. This is most apparent in Cambridge, where he designed a student hostel, King's College: West Road: Garden Hostel. Built between 1948 and 1950, its utilitarian austerity is softened by the adjacent King's College Fellows' Garden. Despite the imposed restrictions, Hyslop still managed to impart some classical ideals of proportion and height through the use of brick pilasters; further reference to an earlier form of architecture is provided by oeil-de-boeuf windows on the floors above the entrance. Building on his functional college works, Geddes was commissioned as architect for the Staff College at Henley-on-Thame.

The post-war work was not all austerity, however, as some wealthy patrons still existed. The Countess of Rosebery, one of the founders of the Edinburgh Festival, in 1950, persuaded her husband, the Earl of Rosebery, buoyed by his mother's fortune, to have the Rosebery's Scottish seat, Dalmeny House, restored. Considered one of Scotland's finest houses, the mansion had been damaged by fire during the war. The resultant work, executed "sensitively" according to Hugh Montgomery-Massingberd and Christopher Sykes, involved the use of older materials such as original bookcases and 18th-century fireplaces imported from elsewhere.

Another postwar commission was at Daylesford House, the house built by S.P. Cockerell for the Indian nabob Warren Hastings.

Further works included: Roydon Hall, East Peckham, Kent, the seat of Mr Ralph M. Cook.; alterations to the west front of Greenlands, Temple Island in 1936–38; 41 Kensington Square for Mrs Thomas Lowinsky; works at Somerville College, Oxford; and a Garden Hostel, King's College, Cambridge.

== Private life ==
Hyslop lived in an 18th-century house in Canonbury Place, Canonbury, Islington, London with the one time New Statesman editor and art critic, Raymond Mortimer. They lived together for most of their 40 year relationship. Some ephemeral essays on architects and architecture by Geddes Hyslop appeared from time to time in The New Statesman, in part through this connection.

Geddes Hyslop died in 1989.

== Legacy ==
Geddes Hyslop's contribution to British architecture was his talent for designing buildings in complete empathy with their surroundings. In part, he achieved this by the re-use of materials salvaged from older buildings faced with demolition, this is especially true of his interiors.

Hyslop did not design huge futuristic buildings intended to startle the senses, but works that were almost unremarkable, in the sense that their harmony with adjacent buildings, rendered them part of an existing composition. Yet his work was remarkable, for showing a complete understanding of proportion, perspective and historical accuracy.
