= Arturo Barea =

Spanish journalist, broadcaster and writer

- Born: Arturo Barea Ogazón; 20 September 1897; Badajoz, Spain
- Died: 24 December 1957 (aged 60); Faringdon, Oxfordshire, England
- Resting place: All Saints Church, Faringdon; 51°39′34.46″N 1°35′0.53″W
- Citizenship: Spain; United Kingdom (from 1948)
- Occupations: Writer, journalist, broadcaster
- Spouse(s): Aurelia Rimaldos (1924-1937); Ilse Pollak (1938-1957) (his death)

Arturo Barea Ogazón (20 September 1897 – 24 December 1957) was a Spanish journalist, broadcaster and writer. After the Spanish Civil War, Barea left with his wife Ilsa Barea to live in exile in England where he died. His best-known work is his three-part autobiography La forja de un rebelde (The Forging of a Rebel).

== Biography ==
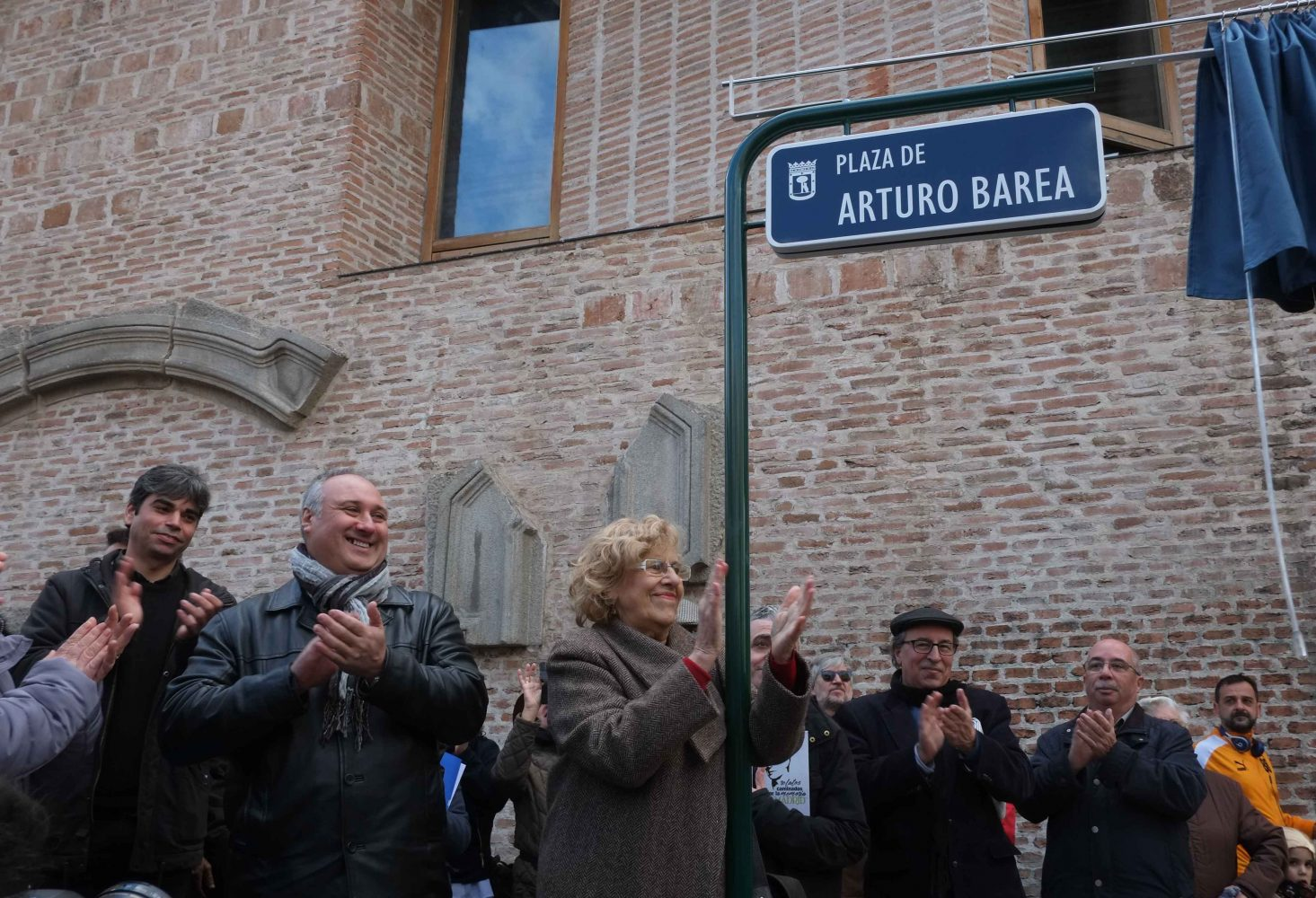
Inauguration in Madrid of a square named after Arturo Barea, March 2017

Barea was born in Badajoz, of humble origins. His father died when he was four months old, so his mother, with four young children to support, worked as a laundress, washing clothes in the River Manzanares, while the family lived in a garret in the poor Lavapiés district of Madrid. Barea was semi-adopted by his aunt and uncle who were prosperous enough to send him to school. This resulted in his first experience of the class divisions that riddled Spanish society, when his own sister accused him of "acting the gentleman" while she worked as a servant. He left school aged 13 and got a job at a bank as an office boy and copyist, though did not become a fully paid employee for another year. He later quit after being fined for breaking a glass-plate desk cover.

Barea served his compulsory military service in Ceuta and Morocco. Reenlisting as a regular soldier he rose to the rank of sergeant in an engineer regiment of the Spanish Army and saw action in the Rif War. He began writing and published some poems. He then worked in an office registering patents (he had originally wanted to be an engineer), and in 1924, he married for the first time. He was a member of the Socialist UGT (Unión General de Trabajadores) and helped found the Clerical Workers Union at the start of the Second Spanish Republic in 1931.

On the outbreak of the Spanish Civil War in mid-1936 he organized a volunteer militia unit La Pluma (The Pen) of office workers fighting under the UGT. Later, thanks to his knowledge of English and French, he worked as a censor at the Foreign Ministry's Press Office where he came to know Ernest Hemingway and many other foreign journalists covering the conflict. John Dos Passos, in a 1938 article published in Esquire, referred to Barea as "underslept and underfed". During the Siege of Madrid he joined the Radio Service broadcasting to Latin America, where he became known as An Unknown Voice of Madrid, every night telling stories about daily life in the besieged city. He also met the Austrian journalist Ilse Kulcsar (née Pollak), whom he married in 1938.

As defeat for the Spanish Government loomed, this, along with difficulties with the Communist party (he was not a member and therefore suspect), and a breakdown in his health, meant that he and his wife had to leave Spain. They went into exile to France in the middle of 1938, and then to England in 1939. From then until his death, Barea worked for the BBC's World Service Spanish section while contributing articles and reviews to various literary publications, as well as writing books. At that time, also, Ilsa Barrea was working for the BBC Monitoring Service, translated books into English, and lectured and broadcast in several languages.

Barea spent the last ten years of his life living at Middle Lodge in Eaton Hastings, a house rented from Gavin Henderson, 2nd Baron Faringdon, of nearby Buscot Park.

He died on 24 December 1957 in his wife Ilsa’s arms from a heart attack. Shortly after his death, Barea's ashes were scattered in his garden at Middle Lodge, and a memorial to Barea and his wife was erected behind her parents' grave (Valentin Pollak and Alice von Zieglmayer) in the churchyard annexe of All Saints Church, Faringdon, Oxfordshire. Ilsa Barea returned to Vienna; in 1966 publishing Vienna: legend and reality and died there while working on her autobiography.

Barea has three Spanish streets named in his honour, in Badajoz, Mérida and Novés; and a square – Plaza de Arturo Barea – in Madrid.

He is a central figure in Amanda Vaill's non-fiction book Hotel Florida, published in 2014.

== Publications ==
Maxim Lieber was Barea's literary agent in 1947 and 1950.

=== The Forging of a Rebel ===
His best-known work is his autobiography La forja de un rebelde (The Forging of a Rebel), published in three volumes:

- La forja (The Forge) provides a detailed and evocative account of his childhood and adolescence growing up in Madrid between 1905 and 1914. (It was reviewed favourably by George Orwell in Horizon, "a fragment of autobiography, and we may hope that others will follow it... if the Fascist powers have done no other good, they have at least enriched the English-speaking world by exiling all their best writers.")
- La ruta (The Track) recounts his military experiences in Morocco during the Rif War from 1920 to 1925. In his foreword to this volume Barea notes that what he witnessed in that war "was the embryonic stage in the development of military fascism in Spain, more particularly the beginnings of General Franco's political career".
- La llama (The Clash, literally The Flame in Spanish) narrates his experience of the Civil War and exile between 1935 and 1940. "The book starts off in a Castilian village and ends up in Paris, but its essential subject is the siege of Madrid."—George Orwell.

The original translation of La forja was by Sir Peter Chalmers Mitchell, an English eccentric who had stayed on in Malaga after the outbreak of the civil war and was later imprisoned by Franco’s henchmen. In subsequent editions this was substituted by a new translation by Ilsa Barea, who translated all Arturo's other books. They were first published between 1941 and 1946. Orwell, in his review of the trilogy said: "An excellent book … Señor Barea is one of the most valuable of the literary acquisitions that England has made as a result of Fascist persecution”. The first Spanish language edition was published in Argentina in 1951 (by Editorial Losada), and not published in Spain until 1978. La forja de un rebelde was dramatised on TVE in 1990, directed and with screenplay by Mario Camus. Gabriel García Márquez considered it one of the "ten best books written in Spain following the Spanish Civil War", and "One of the best novels written in Spanish".

=== Short stories ===
- Valor y miedo (Courage and Fear), Spain, 1938.
- El centro de la pista (The Center of the Path), 1960.

=== Biographies ===
- Lorca, the Poet and his People, 1944, about Federico García Lorca
- Unamuno, 1952, about Miguel de Unamuno

=== Novels ===
- La raíz rota (The Broken Root), 1955. Published in Spanish in 2009 by Editorial Salto de Página, Madrid.

=== Political essays ===
- Struggle for the Spanish Soul, Secker & Warburg, 1941.
- Spain in the Post-War World, Fabian Publication, 1945.
- Struggle for the Spanish Soul & Spain in the Post-War World, Translated by Ilsa Barea, The Clapton Press, 2021.
