= Edward Loveden Loveden =

English Member of Parliament

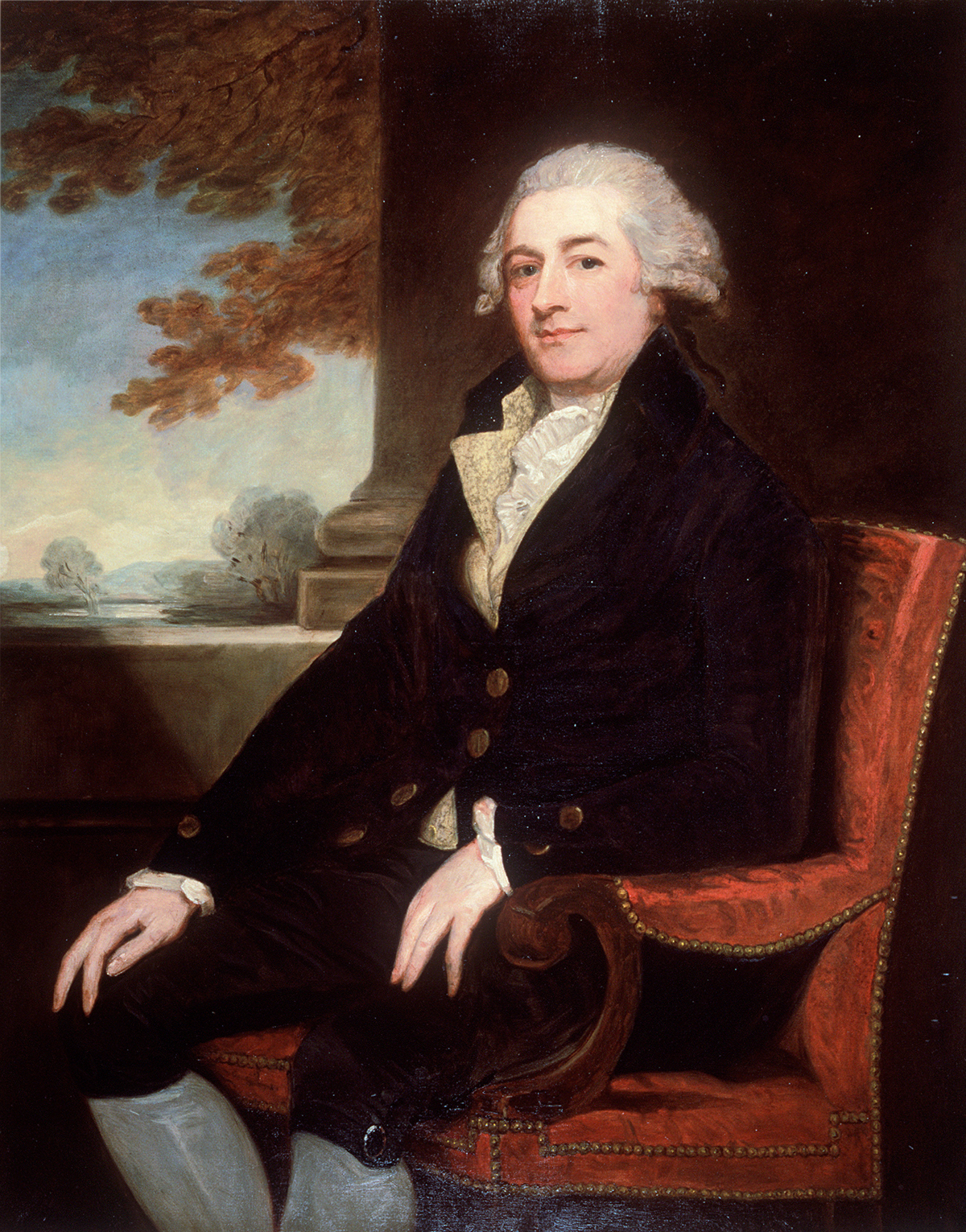
Edward Loveden Loveden by George Romney

Edward Loveden Loveden FRS (ca. 1749/1751–1822) was an English Member of Parliament (MP), sometimes described as a Whig but often not voting with that party.

== Life ==
The date of birth of Edward Loveden Loveden, whose birthname was Edward Loveden Townsend, is uncertain. He is variously stated to have been born in 1749, 1750 and 1751. His father was Thomas Townsend, from Cirencester in Gloucestershire, and his mother, Jane, was from Buscot, then in Berkshire. He attended Winchester College for three years up to 1765 and entered Trinity College, Oxford in 1767, by which time his father had died. He changed his name to Edward Loveden Loveden by royal license in 1772. The change was imposed on him by a relative – Edward Loveden, variously stated as his uncle or great-uncle – as a condition of their bequest to him of the manor at Buscot. He owned Buscot Park, near Faringdon in present-day Oxfordshire.

Loveden entered the House of Commons from the Abingdon constituency in 1783 when he won a by-election caused by of the death of the sitting member, Henry Howorth. He sat then as an opponent of the Fox–North coalition and claimed to be a free agent, not tied to any political group. In the same year, he joined the Thames Navigation Commission, of which he became particularly active from 1789.

Loveden retained his seat in the 1784 general election and, despite some local opposition based on his parsimonious tendencies, again in 1790. In 1793, he was aligned with the "third party" of William Windham. From that year, and coinciding with the end of his most active period as a Thames Commissioner, he became a member of the Board of Agriculture.

Loveden was forced out of the Abingdon seat in 1796 and lost the contest for one of the two Berkshire seats at that year's election. Between 1802 and 1812, he served as MP for Shaftesbury.

Loveden was elected a Fellow of the Royal Society in 1805 and had served as High Sheriff of Berkshire during 1781–82 and as High Sheriff of Brecknockshire in 1799–1800. He also served as an officer in the Berkshire Militia, as a captain from 1779, and as its Lieutenant-Colonel 1794–1796.

== Family ==
Loveden was married three times, firstly in 1773 to Margaret, daughter of Lewis Pryse of Gogerddan, Cardiganshire, with whom he had a son and two daughters. Margaret died in 1784 and in the following year he married the widowed Elizabeth Nash, a daughter of the MP John Darker. Elizabeth died in 1788 and in 1794 Loveden married Anne, whose father was Thomas Lintall.

Loveden separated from Anne in 1808, which resulted in a notable divorce case. 22 years younger than Loveden, it was alleged that she had begun an affair with a Mr Barker, a Fellow of Merton College, Oxford, with Loveden's staff providing evidence to support the claim. Divorce in England at that time was a three-stage process and although Loveden eventually won his case for criminal conversation, the divorce was never finalised because when some years later he presented his private petition to obtain it from the Houses of Parliament, it was ruled that he would have to pay her a £400 annuity. He objected to doing so, arguing that it amounted to rewarding her for being adulterous, and thereafter actually petitioned the House of Lords not to grant the petition.

Loveden attempted to control his daughters, objecting without success to the marriage of Margaret to Samuel Wilson Warneford and then driving away the fiancé of Jane. His son became known as Pryse Pryse and was also an MP, taking advantage of the inheritance of money and lands in Wales that had been brought into the family by his mother.

== See also ==
- Buscot Lock
- Pryse baronets
