= Novés =

Coordinates: 40.048°N 4.271°W

Novés, Spain
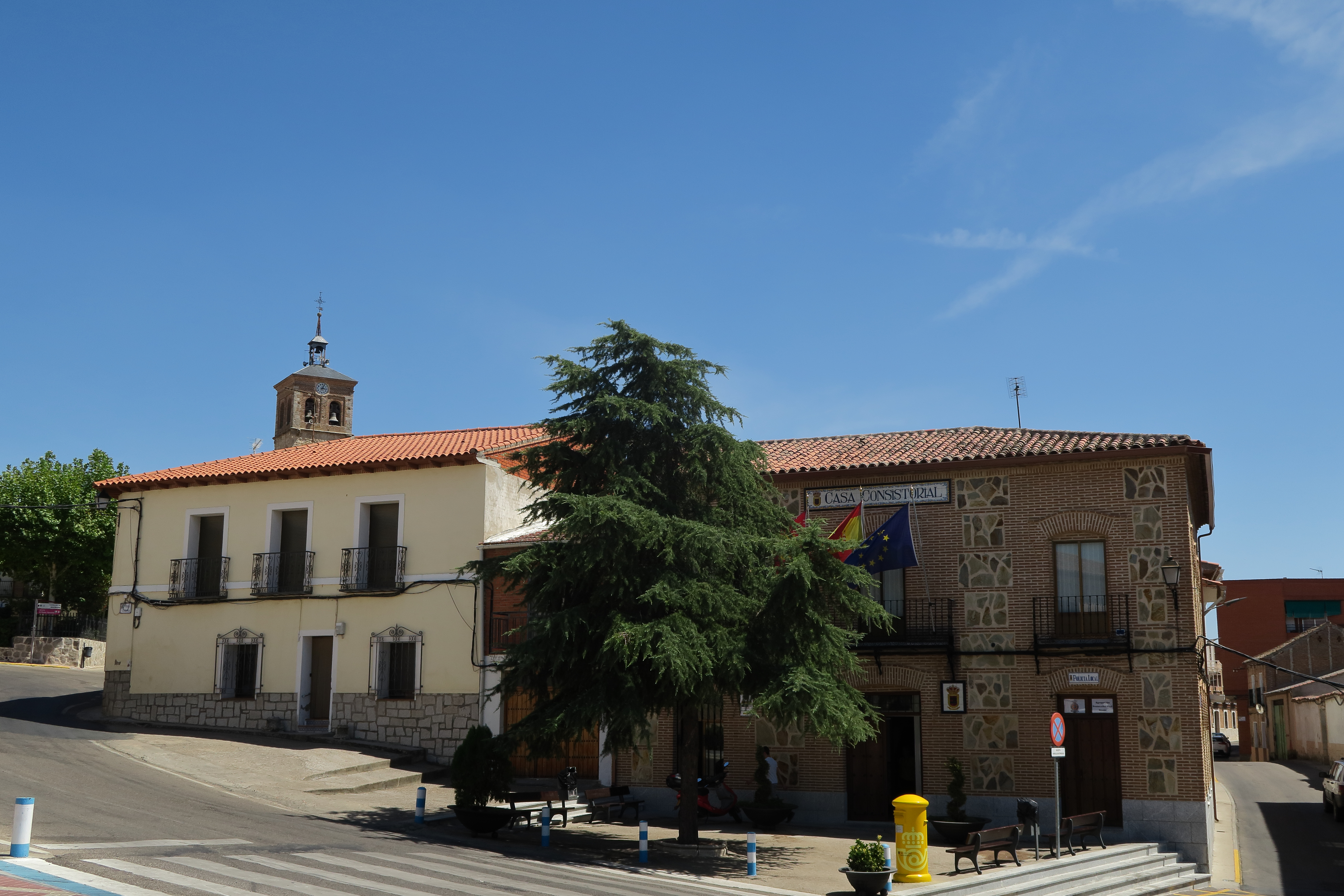
- Novés Town Hall

- Flag Coat of arms
- Interactive map of Novés, Spain
- Country: Spain
- Autonomous community: Castile-La Mancha
- Province: Toledo
- Municipality: Novés

Area
  - Total: 42 km^{2} (16 sq mi)
- Elevation: 573 m (1,880 ft)

Population (2025-01-01)
  - Total: 3,564
  - Density: 85/km^{2} (220/sq mi)
- Time zone: UTC+1 (CET)
  - Summer (DST): UTC+2 (CEST)

Novés is a municipality located in the province of Toledo, Castile-La Mancha, Spain. According to the 2006 census (INE), the municipality has a population of 1911 inhabitants.

In his autobiographical trilogy The Forging of a Rebel, the Spanish writer Arturo Barea sets one chapter "The Lost Village" in Novés, using it as a microcosm of the social and political tensions building up to the outbreak of the Spanish Civil War.

== Notable people ==
- Francisca de los Apóstoles (born between 1539 and 1541)
