= Francisca de los Apóstoles =

Personal life
- Home town: Novés, Spain
- Known for: Inquisition Trial
- Other name: Francisca de Avila

Religious life
- Religion: Catholicism

Francisca de los Apóstoles or Francisca de Avila was a devout beata, a woman who sought to lead a life defined by pious devotion to God, a Catholic visionary and religious reformer who lived in Toledo, Spain, amid the Spanish Inquisition.

During her life Francisca experienced a series of intense spiritual visions that inspired her to work against poverty and combat inequity. She specifically targeted the hypocrisy and corruption of the Toledan church leadership through her reform efforts to establish a monastery and convent.

These efforts ultimately prompted formal denunciations of mysticism (specifically the practices of the alumbrados) and diabolical possession (endemoniado). She underwent a three-year trial before the Inquisitorial tribunals. When convicted, she was sentenced one hundred lashes and was expelled from Toledo, disappearing from written history.

== Context ==
=== The Spanish Inquisition ===
The Tribunal of the Holy Office of the Inquisition was a system through which heretics, primarily conversos, who had converted to Catholicism from Islam or Judaism were observed, interrogated and often expelled.

As the threat of Protestant Reformation encroached Spain, new spiritual ideas that championed private, personal relationships with God gained prominence. The Inquisition evolved into a Counter Reformation mechanism that sought to keep all religious organizing within the confined of the well defined orders of the institution and executed invasive investigation of orthodoxy within the Spanish Catholic Church.

=== Toledo at the time ===
In 1570 Toledo was experiencing a steady economic downturn. Decades of crop failure had left Toledo's pósito unable to keep up with the rising demand of an ever-increasing population. Compounded by a sharp spike in taxes poverty gripped the area.

At this time the Toledan church was under the control the governor, Sancho Busto de Villegas, because its archbishop, Bartolomé Carranza, was arrested by the Inquisition Tribunal in 1559 on charges of heresy. A number of Francisca's letters reveal her despair over the suffering and injustices that the archbishop faced while being imprisoned and an underlying theme of her visions was a call for the release of archbishop Carranza.

The governor overseeing church ministries failed to provide adequate relief and or remedy to these mounting problems of poverty.

== Early life ==
There is very little known about Francisca other than what is revealed in her Inquisition trial testimonies. She was born in the town of Novés, between 1539 and 1541. Her father was an artist named Cerbian de Avila and her mother, Juana Diaz, died very early in Francisca's life. Although unclear, given Francisca's circumstances and her modest background, her family may have been conversos. When her father moved to Madrid to pursue greater career opportunities she took residence with a noble woman named Francisca Samienrnero.

=== Religious background ===
When she was sixteen years old she was sent to Toledo to live at the church of Santa Maria la Blanca, with a community of beatas. She remained there until she was twenty-four years old when she left to live with a few of her sisters and affiliated herself with the Church of Santo Tome in Toledo.

One of her sisters, Isabel Bautista, became extremely sick in 1570. She was completely bedridden and endured a series of grueling exorcisms that lasted over five months. As a result of the exorcists, Isabel felt a strong urge to live a life that would better please God, by dressing modestly, recusing herself and devoting more time to prayer. As a result, Francisca became more devoted to the spiritual and began practicing prayer and penance with greater intent.

== Visions ==
Over eleven months in 1574, Francisca experienced a number of spiritual visions. Through these visions she received talents and wisdom and came to understand what she believed her greater religious purpose was.

=== The Judgement ===
In January 1574 Francisca received her first vision at the Chapel of Nuestra Senora del Saragio. In this vision she saw Saint Peter deny the church officials of Toledo entry into the heavenly kingdom and Mary is seen interceding before Christ on their behalf. According to Apóstoles this reflects the dishonesty that existed within the church leadership in Toledo and the redemptive role that she is destined to play.

=== Torments by demons ===
A week later she had another rapture, in which Christ asks her to accept the torture of demons as penance for all the sins the world has committed against God. After six months of intense prayer and reflection, she accepts these torments. From June to October 1574 Francisca endured torture from demons. Francisca testifies that through the torture she was able to fully comprehend how to combat temptation and sin. She testifies that the torments ended when she vowed to commit her life to upholding virtue, and that she knew that she defeated the demons because of the relief and serene inner peace she felt after making those vows.

=== The Justice of God ===
In December 1574 Francisca became very ill. During the course of her illness she experienced dejamiento, a spiritual experience where one is transported outside of themselves during prayer. In this out of body experience she felt God's wrath, and saw Christ suffer on the cross. Her vision was witnessed by family and friends and is said to have lasted over three hours, and it took her three days to recover. From this vision Francisca testified that she came to fear the justice and condemnatory power of God.

=== The Life of Christ ===
Less than a week later Francisca once again had a powerful vision. In this one she came to realize her greater purpose and realized the parallels between Christ's life and virtues and her own. She vowed to embody those virtues and take on the same redemptive role as Christ by becoming an intercessor. She considered this a sign from God to establish a religious community that would protect women that were more susceptible to the poverty and misery that was rampant in Toledo at the time. Through her monastic reforms, she hoped that the Church would be redeemed.

== Religious reforms ==
Francisca's reforms were directly inspired by her visions and she believed that she presented a divinely ordained solution to a social, moral and economic problem that her government and church were both apathetic toward and failed to address. The reforms were also pointed criticism of the Toledan church. Toledo was the richest archdiocese in Spain, and while Church officials were wealthy and lived comfortably, the majority of the laity lived in squalor.

Francisca's main goal was to alleviate poverty and she would often plead to God to help the poor. She saw the great need there was in Toledo and at one point even gave her home to a poor woman who had no shelter. Poor unmarried women with few options, without a connection to a religious community or organization that offered them financial support or vocational training, often resorted to prostitution to make a living. Francisca's religious reforms sought to establish a beaterio, a house for beatas, to provide a space for women to live without fear of losing their virtue and also allow them to pursue more pious lives and seek forgiveness for their sins through worship.

Public scandal prevented Francisca from obtaining approval from the governor of Toledo for establishing her convent or monastery. The source or nature of the scandal is lost but is clear that the city was divided in its support for Carranza and for the provisional leadership of the church. Additionally, there were prevailing doubts about the authenticity of Apóstoles' visions and concerns about her personal charm. Despite several attempts to legitimize the reform plans through the administrative system of the Toledo archdiocese she was unable to secure either civil permission or substantial economic support for her plans.

Despite these obstacles she managed to garner support and wielded a great deal of influence. She enjoyed a public reputation as a pious and wise woman. Most notably, a Franciscan friar named Juan Bautista fiercely supported and defended Francisca's desire to establish the convent and monastery. He was moved by both Francisca's and Isabel's piety and believed it was just a matter of time before their plans would be approved. In the meantime he encouraged individuals to join the community. Their endeavors attracted public attention that would lead to the arrest of Francisca and her subsequent Inquisition trial.

== The Inquisition of Francisca de los Apóstoles ==
=== Accusations ===
On November 19, 1574, the initial accusations against Francisca were alleged by Luisa de Aguilera who was a financial supporter of the convent and Catalina de Jesus one of the beatas within the convent. The testimonies of these women consisted of accusing Francisca of being prideful and an endemoniado.

Due to a number of high-priority cases that were ongoing at the time, the allegations against Francisca were not taken seriously at first. The tribunal did not decide to move forward until Sebastián Hernández, a credible and trusted Jesuit, gave a testimony about the nature and source of Francisca's reforms, and after conducting the calificaciones, a thorough theological investigation with twenty-four witnesses. Francisca was characterized as a heretic, blasphemer, and perjurer. Overall, the reports described her as arrogant and self-righteous and her visions as clear examples of alumbrados, the phenomenon in which God speaks directly to someone in prayer, and heretical mysticism.

=== Arrest and trial ===
On September 28, 1575, Francisca was arrested and imprisoned. On October 5, 1575, she appeared before the inquisitor Juan de Llano de Valdéz. The inquisitor spent a great deal of time discussing the nature, content, matter and duration of her visionary experiences. The Inquisition viewed Fransica's revelations and visions as problematic. Her claims regarding her redemptive role were suspicious and contradicted clerical authority. According to the tribunal her justifications for her reforms had no rational basis and were lacking because there was no definitive proof that Francisca could distinguish divine communication from demonic communication.

On January 5, 1576, June de Llano de Valdez formally charged Francisca of falsifying alumbrados and heretical mysticism. It was the belief of the Inquisition that a revelation gained in private mental prayer is inherently false and could be used to deceive others.

Francisca justified her reforms on the basis of "divine edict". She said her visions occurred after having taken communion and were accompanied by a form of sweet rapture that left her soul in a peaceful state. Francisca was unable to provide definite proof that her visions were authentic and divine: subjective accounts of her spiritual revelations and her reasoning for her reforms were unacceptable.

=== Conviction and sentencing ===
On April 14, 1578, after three years on trial, Francisca was convicted of falsifying alumbrados and heretical mysticism, sentenced to one hundred lashes, and banished from Toledo for three years. She disappears from written history following her trial so there is no saying if she ever returned.

== See also ==
- Teresa of Ávila
