= La forja de un rebelde (TV series) =

Television series

- Genre: Biographical; Historical drama
- Based on: The Forging of a Rebel by Arturo Barea
- Screenplay by: Juan Antonio Porto; Mario Camus
- Directed by: Mario Camus
- Starring: Antonio Valero
- Composer: Lluís Llach
- Countries of origin: Spain; Germany
- Original language: Spanish
- No. of seasons: 1
- No. of episodes: 6

Production
- Running time: 90 min (approx.)
- Production companies: Estela Films; TVE; Beta Film

Original release
- Network: TVE1
- Release: 30 March – 4 May 1990

La forja de un rebelde (lit. 'The Forging of a Rebel') is a Spanish-German television series directed by Mario Camus adapting the autobiographical book trilogy The Forging of a Rebel by Arturo Barea. It originally aired on TVE1 in 1990.

== Premise ==
The plot is an adaptation of the autobiographical book trilogy The Forging of a Rebel (La forja, La ruta and La llama). Tracking the life of Arturo Barea (a left-wing Republican), it spans from 1907 to the Fall of Madrid to the Francoist forces in April 1939, in the last rales of the Spanish Civil War. It also accounts for the period when the leading character was destined for military conscription in the midst of the Moroccan War.

The story is the account of a man defeated in the Civil War who went on into exile, entailing a homage to the victims of Francoism.

== Cast ==
- Jorge Juan García Contreras as Arturo Barea (kid).
- Javier Morales as Arturo Barea (teenager).
- Antonio Valero as Arturo Barea (adult).
- Carmen Rossi.
- Lydia Bosch as Aurelia.
- Alejandra Grepi as Concha.
- Simón Andreu as Heliodoro.
- Rafael Alonso as Don Arsenio.
- María Barranco as Chuchi.
- Mercedes Lezcano as María.
- Magdalena Ritter as Ilsa Kulcsar.
- José Luis López Vázquez.
- Ángel de Andrés as tío José.
- Ángel de Andrés López as Padre Joaquín.
- Jorge Sanz as war disabled.
- Lola Forner as nurse.
- Manuel Alexandre.

Edith Macarthur as British lady

== Production and release ==
The production costed around 2,300 million peseta, the highest budget ever for a TVE production up to release date. Promoted by Pilar Miró and described as "the last great super-production" of the Spanish public broadcaster, the series made use of around 20,000 extras.

Filming took 20 months. Besides set-filming in Pozuelo de Alarcón and Madrid, the series was shot in multiple locations across the Spanish geography such as Brozas, Aliseda, Santiago del Campo, Talaván, Jaraicejo, Aranjuez, Alcalá de Henares, Arganda del Rey, Boadilla del Monte, Morata de Tajuña, Navalcarnero, Arenas de San Pedro, Mombeltrán, El Puente del Arzobispo, Méntrida, Alcabón, Bilbao, Santander, Sierra del Torcal (Antequera), Tarifa, Écija, San Carlos del Valle, Villanueva de los Infantes, Manzanares, Oliva and La Manga as well as in Morocco: Tetouan, Asilah, Chaouen and Mdiq.

Mario Camus directed the series. He also co-wrote the screenplay together with Juan Antonio Porto. Reyes Abades was responsible for the special effects whereas Javier Tusell served as historical advisor. The score was composed by Lluís Llach.

The series, consisting of 6 episodes with a running time of roughly 90 minutes, premiered on 30 March 1990. The weekly broadcasting run ended on 4 May 1990. It earned high viewership figures.
