= Buscot Park =

Country house, gardens and estate near Faringdon, Oxfordshire, England

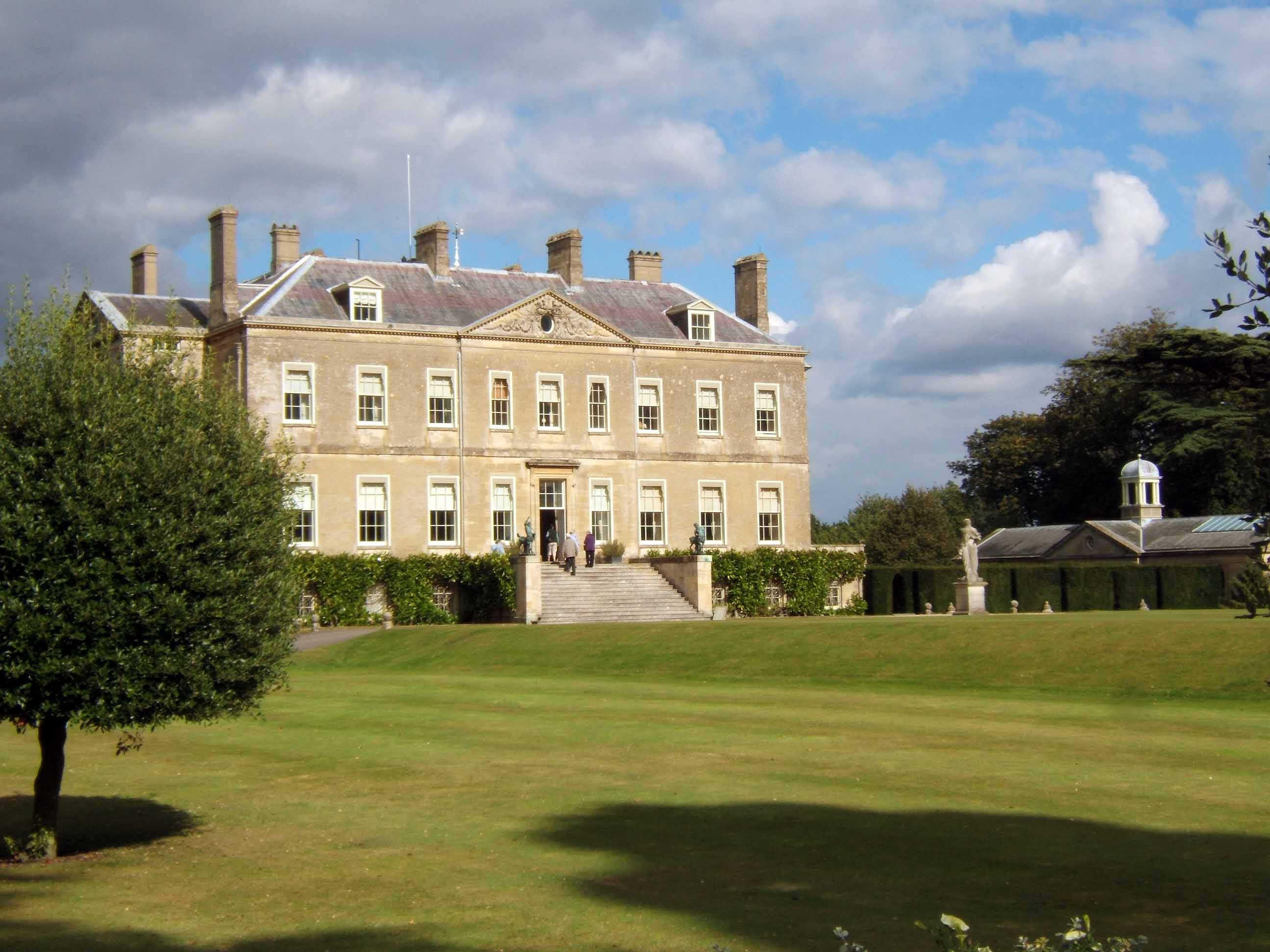
- Buscot Park, the south front.

- Location within Oxfordshire

General information
- Architectural style: Neoclassical
- Location: Faringdon, Oxfordshire, England
- Coordinates: 51.66970°N 1.64993°W
- Construction started: 1780; 246 years ago
- Client: Edward Loveden Loveden
- Owner: National Trust

Technical details
- Grounds: 100 acres (40 ha)

Listed Building – Grade II*
- Official name: Buscot Park
- Designated: 10 November 1952
- Reference no.: 1368116

National Register of Historic Parks and Gardens
- Official name: Buscot
- Designated: 1 June 1984
- Reference no.: 1001089

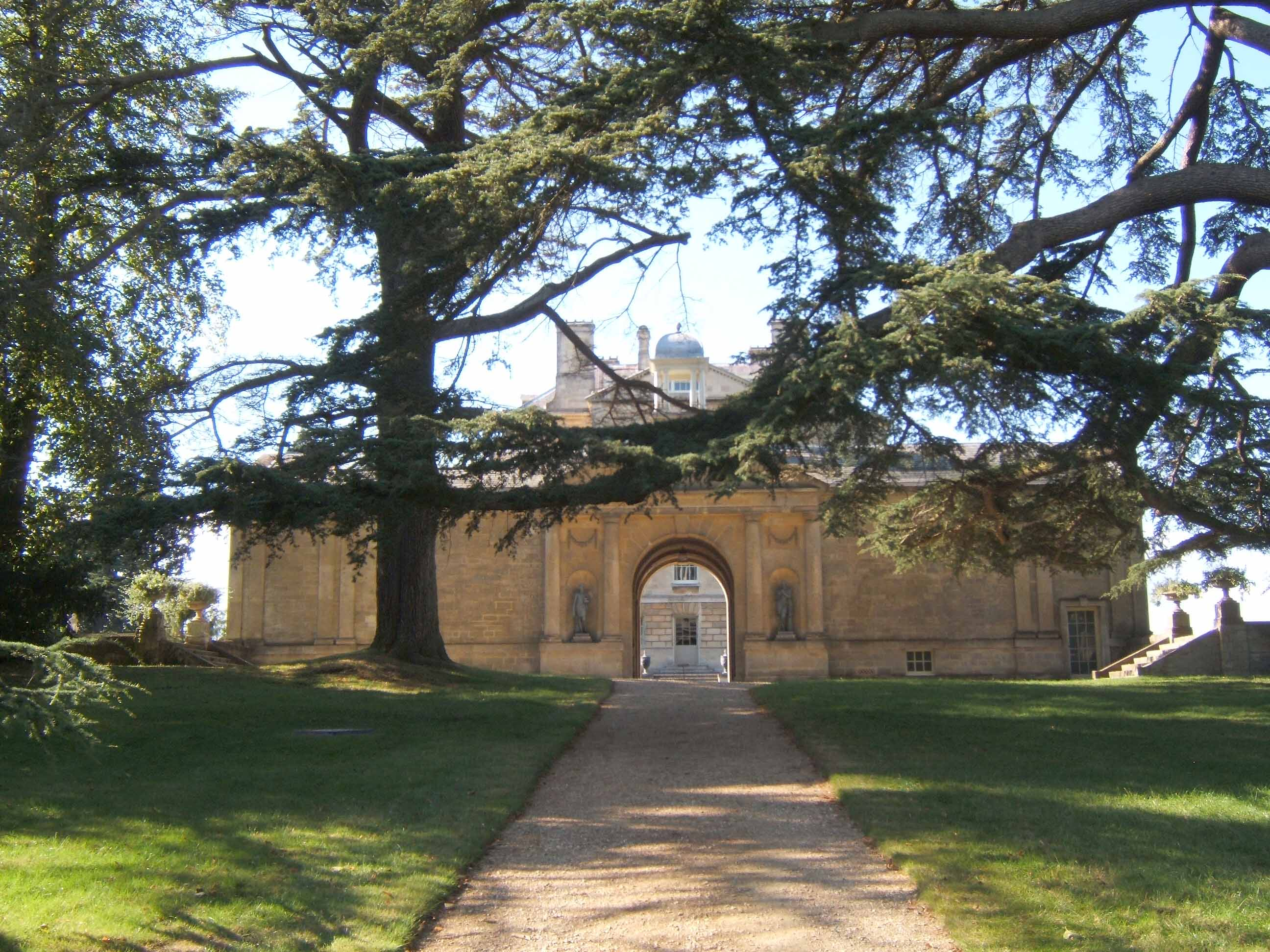
Buscot Park, one of the two flanking wings designed by Geddes Hyslop in 1934 to replace Victorian additions, considered incongruous.

Buscot Park is a country house at Buscot near the town of Faringdon in Oxfordshire within the historic boundaries of Berkshire. It is a Grade II* listed building.

It was built in an austere neoclassical style between 1780 and 1783 for Edward Loveden Loveden. It remained in the family until sold in 1859 to Robert Tertius Campbell, an Australian. Campbell's daughter Florence would later be famous as Mrs Charles Bravo, the central character in a Victorian murder case that remains unsolved to this day. On Campbell's death, in 1887, the house and its estate were sold to Alexander Henderson a financier, later to be ennobled as Baron Faringdon.

Following the death of the 1st Baron in 1934, the house was considerably altered and restored to its 18th-century form, by the architect Geddes Hyslop, for his grandson and successor, Gavin Henderson, 2nd Baron Faringdon, during this era, the art collection founded by the 1st Baron was considerably enlarged, although many of the 1st Baron's 19th-century works of art were sold immediately following his death.

The house and estate was bequeathed to the National Trust in 1956. The contents (which include works of art by Rembrandt and Burne-Jones) are owned by the Faringdon Collection Trust. The house is occupied and managed by the present Lord Faringdon. The mansion and its extensive formal and informal gardens and grounds are open to the public each summer.

== Architecture ==
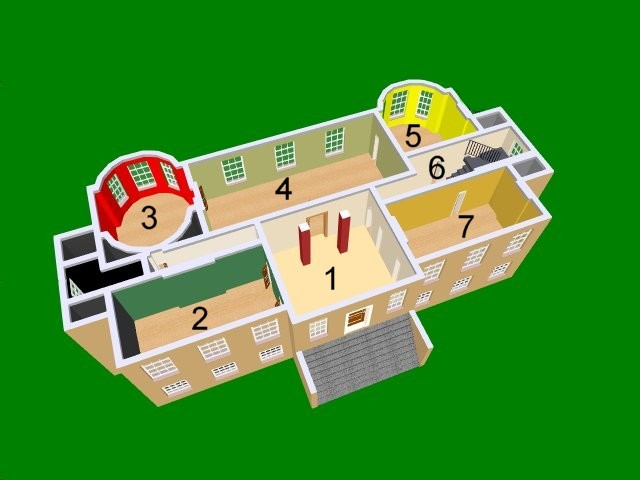
Buscot Park, the piano nobile. 1: Hall; 2: Dutch Room; 3: Dining Room; 4: Saloon; 5: Drawing Room; 6: Staircase Hall; 7: Sitting Room.

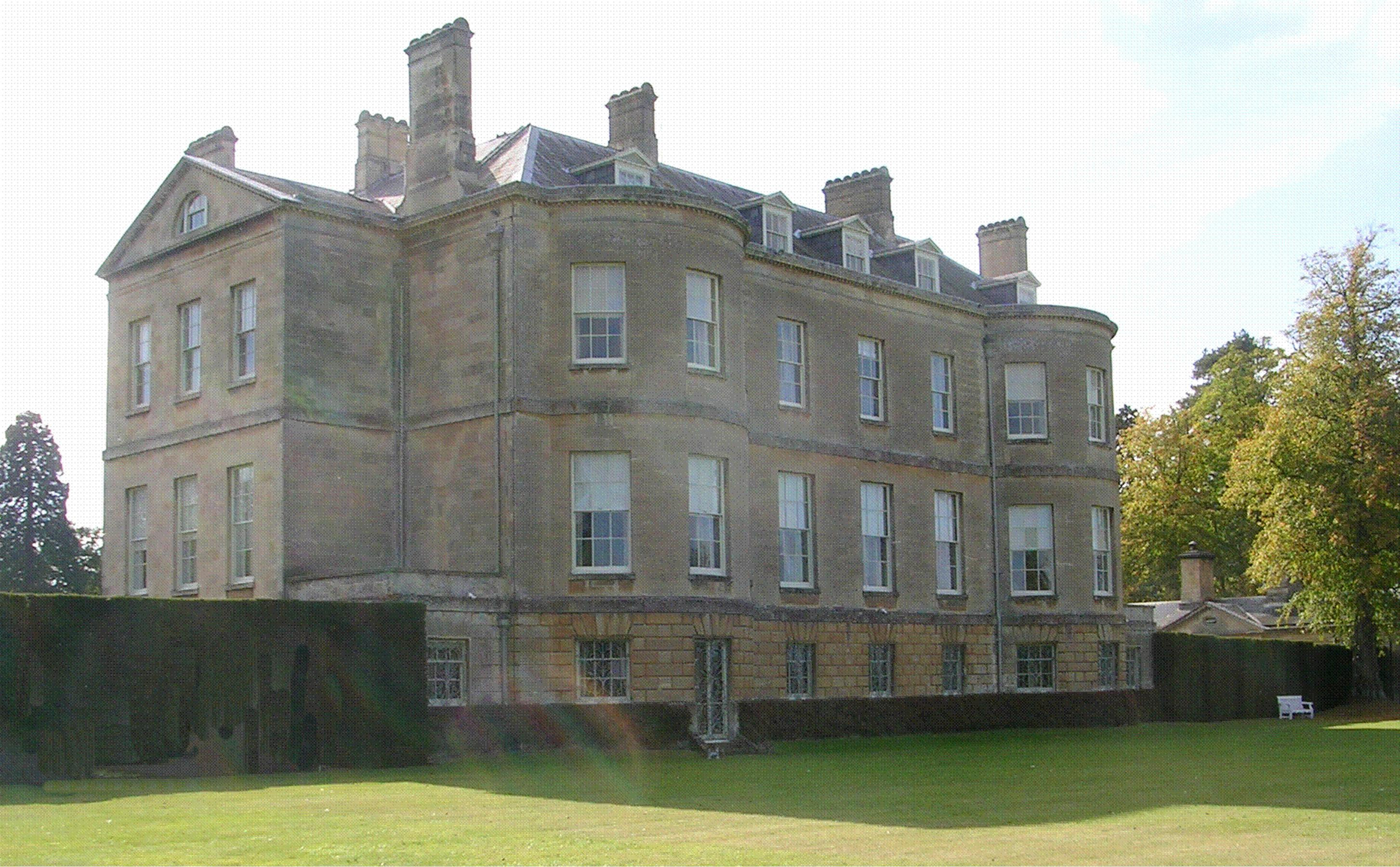
Buscot Park, the north front

The construction of Buscot Park was begun in 1780, for Edward Loveden Loveden, whose family had owned land adjacent to the site since 1557. The land upon which he chose to build the house itself was owned by the neighbouring Throckmorton estate. Loveden Loveden did not acquire ownership of the land upon which his house was built until 1788. The architect is unknown, and it is likely that Loveden himself had a hand in the design. Loveden is known to have employed James Darley at this time; a little-known architect, described by a contemporary as "able and experienced." The names of other far more eminent architects have been mentioned in connection with Buscot, including that of Robert Adam, but there is no documented evidence that any of these architects worked on the house; it therefore seems likely their involvement is apocryphal. It is known that James Paine supplied fireplaces and advised on the building costs, but the general design of the mansion is unsophisticated and not in character with Paine's work, making it unlikely that his involvement was major.

The house is constructed of local stone and materials with Portland stone adornments. The roof is of Westmorland slate. Some of the building materials were bought second-hand, following demolitions and alterations to Kempsford House, Gloucestershire, and Charlton House. Whoever the architect was, the design fails to follow the strict dictates of either the Palladian style, which was passing from fashion, or those of the neoclassical style, which had been becoming popular in England from the late 1760s. Christopher Hussey, writing in 1940, opined that "The architect owed much to Robert Adam and the pattern books of the admirable tradesmen of the day."

Unusually for a house of this period, the house has neither portico nor pilasters to break the austerity of the façade. Contemporary drawings show that the principal and central entrance originally had a segmented pediment, a motif of the Baroque, long out of fashion by the 1780s. This entrance, like the principal reception rooms, was placed in the first floor, on a piano nobile in Palladian style, leaving the ground floor free for the domestic and estate offices and service rooms. However, in neoclassical style, above the principal floor is a second floor, its windows having equal value to those below, indicating that here were principal bedrooms rather than secondary and servants' rooms, as would have been the case in a Palladian or Baroque design.

The severity of the façade, which is of nine bays, is only relieved by a band between the two major floors and the slight projection of the central three bays which are crowned by a low pediment. Following the Palladian tradition, the ground floor is rusticated. The roofline has only a very low parapet and no balustrade, thus leaving the hipped roof and chimneys completely visible. The high slate roof is pierced by two gable windows, more reminiscent of a farmhouse than a sophisticated mansion. The north front more truly follows the neoclassical style, in its English form, of the later 18th century. Two large bows project to flank the central three bays.

In 1859, the house and estate were sold by Loveden Loveden's great grandson, Sir Pryse Pryse. The new owner was an Australian gold trader, Robert "Tertius" Campbell. A keen agriculturist, Campbell extensively modernised the estate, seriously depleting his fortune in the process. During the early 1850s, Campbell considered vastly expanding the mansion, and plans were drawn up showing the house transformed to a turreted palace in a loose English renaissance style. Ultimately, Campbell decided against any grandiose schemes and contented himself by adding a porch, parapet and gabled windows to the neoclassical south front in an incongruous Neo-Renaissance style.

It was at this time that many of the estate's woodlands were planted, along with the creation of new gardens and the carriage drive which form the nucleus of the gardens today. Campbell died in 1887, his fortune spent and the estate mortgaged. Buscot was then acquired by Alexander Henderson, later to be ennobled as the first Baron Faringdon. Henderson, an eminent London stockbroker and financier, enlarged the house with a large wing.

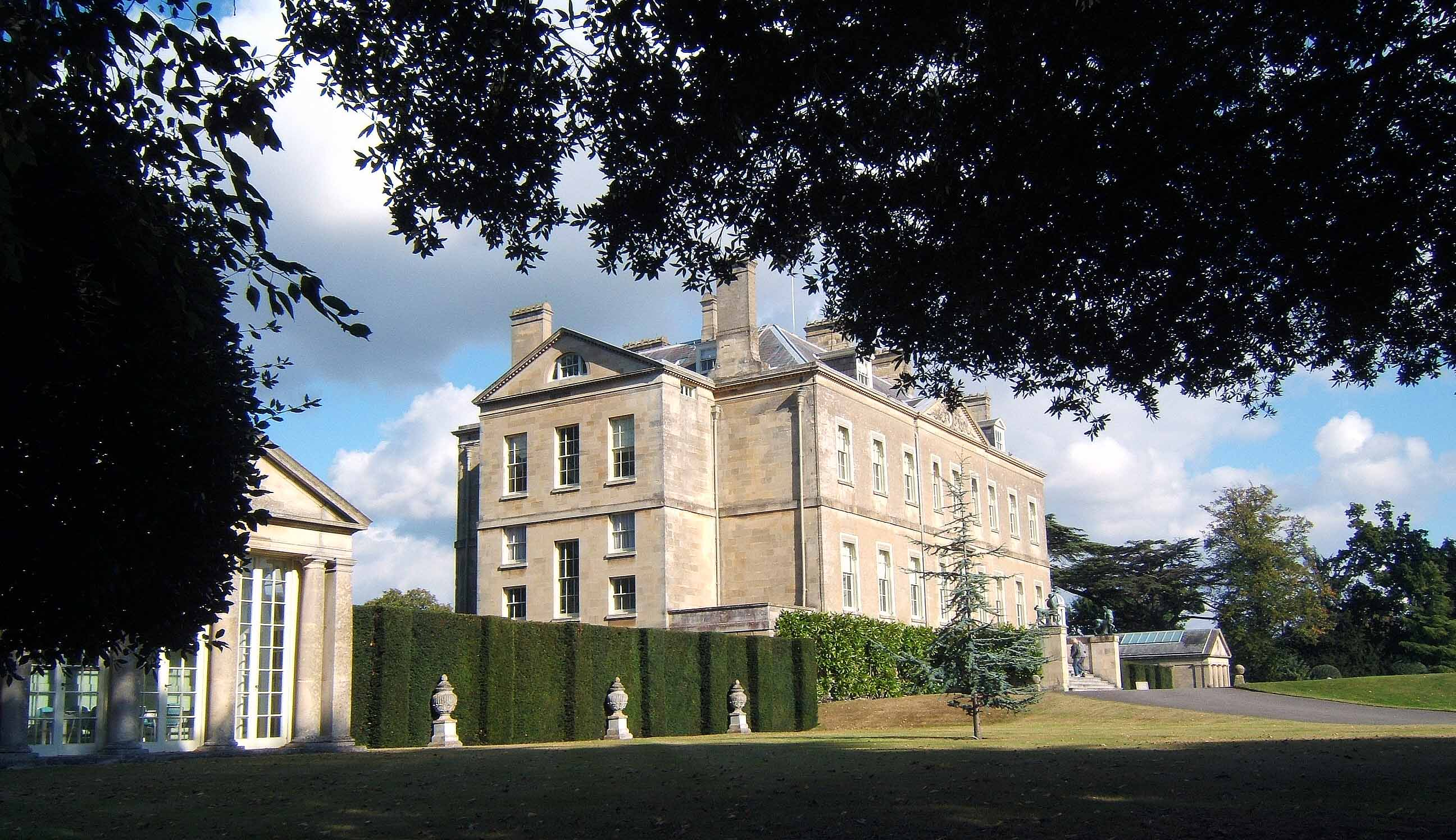
The South Front and the "walls" of yew, linking the 18th-century mansion to Geddes Hyslop's 20th century flanking pavilions.

In the 1930s, a time when many country houses were being pulled down, converted to schools or standing empty, Buscot enjoyed a renaissance. In 1934, it was inherited by Gavin Henderson, 2nd Baron Faringdon from his grandfather, the 1st Lord Faringdon, and he immediately embarked upon a major remodelling project. He swept away the 19th-century additions of his grandfather and Campbell, returning the façades to their original 18th-century simplicity.

To compensate for the space lost through the demolition, he commissioned the architect Geddes Hyslop to create two flanking pavilions in a loose Palladian style. These pavilions, in reality rectangular but detached wings, had temple fronts complementing the two principal façades, and gave the side elevations of the mansion added grandeur and interest. This was achieved by the addition of a triumphal arch to an otherwise blank curtain wall. The pavilions are given unity with the mansion by high yew hedges acting as walls, which link the buildings, accentuating the Palladianism of the design.

Hyslop's work was not all restoration. Immediately adjacent to the east façade, in a court created by newly planted yew hedging linking the mansion and East Pavilion, Hyslop created a swimming pool garden. The placing of pools was a problem to the owners of country houses in the 20th century; the pools would be treated with some "circumspection" and disguised as something else. Thus, at Buscot, the pool appears as a formal canal pond set in a renaissance garden.

=== Interior ===
The interior of the mansion has been considerably altered and restored since its completion. The rooms are arranged in a circuit, although the principal room, the saloon, is flanked by slightly smaller rooms and adjoining cabinets. It is unlikely these smaller rooms were ever principal bedchambers, as would have been the case just a few years earlier in the 18th century. In fact, the layout was probably completely modern at the time; this is suggested by the siting of the dining room (3 on plan) and the drawing room (6 on plan). Geddes Hyslop's remodelling of the house in 1934 has created a series of seemingly meaningless and similar reception rooms, designed to accommodate large house parties. In some cases (including the Dutch Room) smaller rooms were amalgamated and lost. This has hidden the original uses of the rooms. During the late 18th century, rooms came to be perceived as masculine and feminine and arranged in suites accordingly. In particular the dining and drawing rooms "reigned as king and queen over the other rooms" and were often, as at Buscot, placed symmetrically in the house with a hall or saloon dividing them. The dividing room not only served to muffle the noise of boisterous men, partaking of their post-prandial port and cigars in the "masculine" dining rooms, from the more delicate ladies in the "female" drawing room, but also provided a "little state and distance" for the formal procession from the drawing room to the dining room.

Buscot's design suggests this was the case there. The masculine dining room, library, study and possibly a billiard room were placed en suite on one side of the hall, and the feminine drawing room, music room and morning room on the other. The saloon, the grandest room in the house, containing the best furnishings, was regarded as neutral territory and would have been used only for large receptions, or entertaining the most important guests.

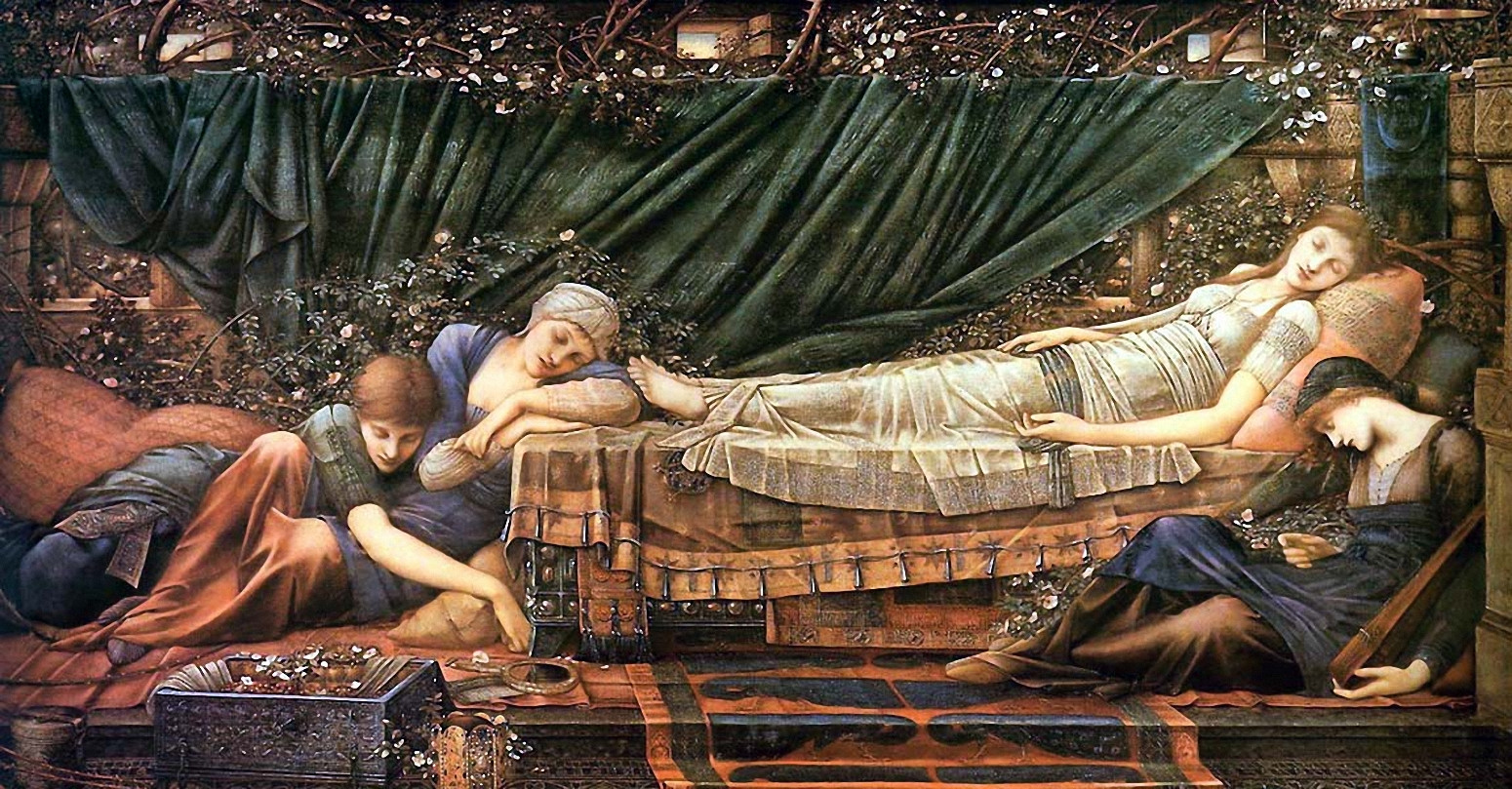
A canvas from Burne-Jones's The legend of Briar Rose

The original use of the rooms is further confirmed by the design of the second floor, where the windows are of equal size to those below, which indicates that the principal bedrooms were always placed there. The principal staircase is comparatively small and not as grand and commanding as is often the case in a neoclassical house, where the owners retired upstairs. The great Baroque houses, built just 50 years earlier, often did not have a principal internal staircase at all, as the owners never left the piano nobile.

It is for their contents, rather than their architecture, that the rooms are notable.

The six principal rooms on the piano nobile contain the cream of an art collection collected by the three Barons Faringdon, from the 1880s to the present day. The Dutch Room (2 on the plan) contains, amongst works by Anthony van Dyck, Jacob Jordaens and Gerard van Honthorst, Rembrandt's Portrait of Pieter Six.

The principal room of the house, the saloon, displays Burne-Jones' The Legend of Briar Rose. Painted over nineteen years from 1871, the series of paintings was acquired by the 1st Lord Faringdon in 1890. The room was then decorated to accommodate them. Burne-Jones, visiting Buscot, disliked the sequence, and painted a further four scenes to fill the voids between the original canvases.

Elsewhere in the house are works by Sandro Botticelli, Agostino Carracci, Giovanni Battista Cipriani, Thomas Gainsborough, Angelica Kauffman, Thomas Lawrence, Frederic Leighton, Peter Lely, Graham Sutherland and others.

== Grounds ==
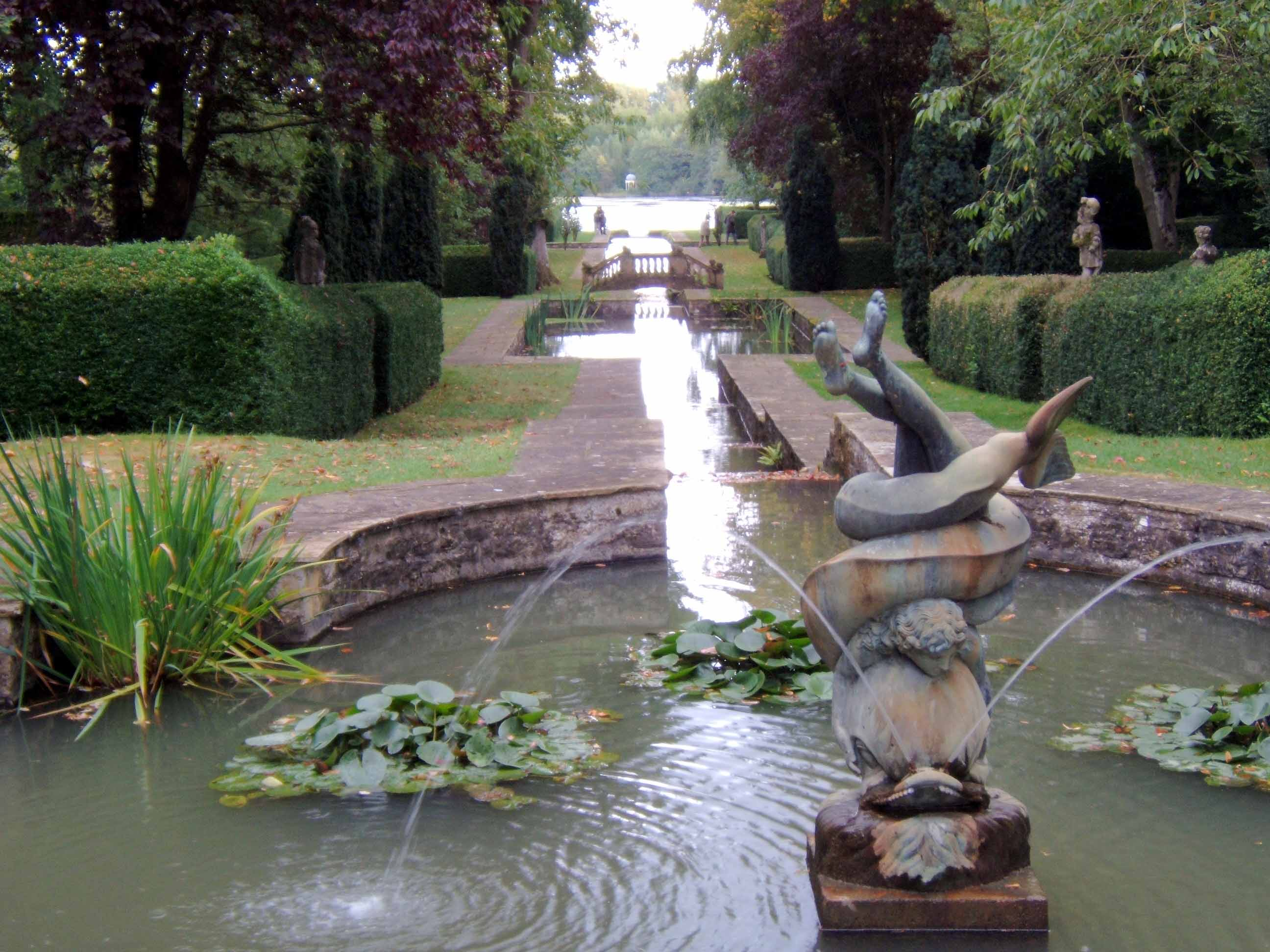
The water gardens, designed by Harold Peto, link the more formal gardens, close to the house, through the park to the distant lake.

The house is set within a large park, of over 100 acres (0.40 km^{2}), containing woodland, lakes and formal gardens. Creation of the park began in 1782. In the early 20th century, the landscape architect Harold Peto worked at Buscot. Water gardens had become popular in the late 19th century, following the introduction of exotic water-loving plants and the first illustrated gardening magazines. Thus, Peto was commissioned to design a water garden. The result was an "Alhambra-like" series of rills and fountains, linking the house to the distant 20-acre (81,000 m^{2}) lake. Despite its woodland setting leading to an informal lake, the water garden is formal in its concept, in direct contrast to the still popular picturesque movement which perhaps reached its zenith just a few years earlier at Cragside, Northumberland. This was because Peto was influenced by the architect Reginald Blomfield, a disciple of Sir Charles Barry who was responsible for many of the great Italianate houses and formal terraced gardens of the 19th century. Peto also designed a large entrance court to the mansion, with massive gate piers, intended to create an impressive approach to the house.

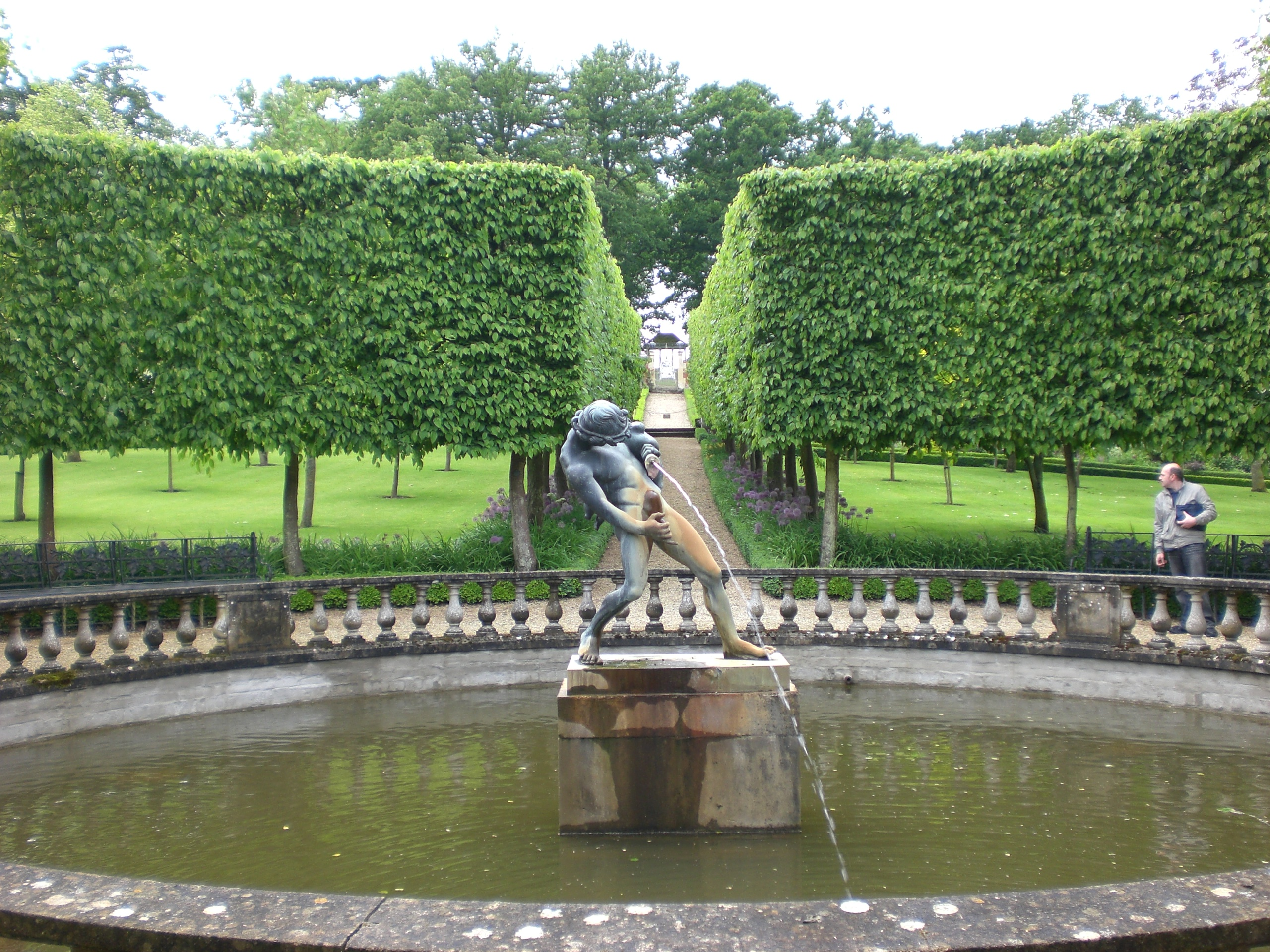
The lily pond in the Four Seasons Garden.

Before the north front of the house is a formal lawned parterre with a bronze fountain depicting Mercury. Leading from the immediate vicinity of the house are a series of woodland avenues which lead to smaller gardens; in the form of roundels these gardens include a citrus garden, a rose garden and a swinging garden. Other woodland vistas lead to various eye catching garden statues, including a monumental urn containing the relics of the 2nd Lord Faringdon.

The vast walled kitchen garden has been replanted over the last 20 years by the present Lord Faringdon, to represent the four seasons, divided into quarters by pleached hornbeams and Judas trees, each section of the garden represents a different season. A novel feature, set on a prominence above the garden is a faux waterfall, a modern sculpture which from a distance creates a convincing optical illusion of a torrential waterfall.

== Private house and public gallery ==
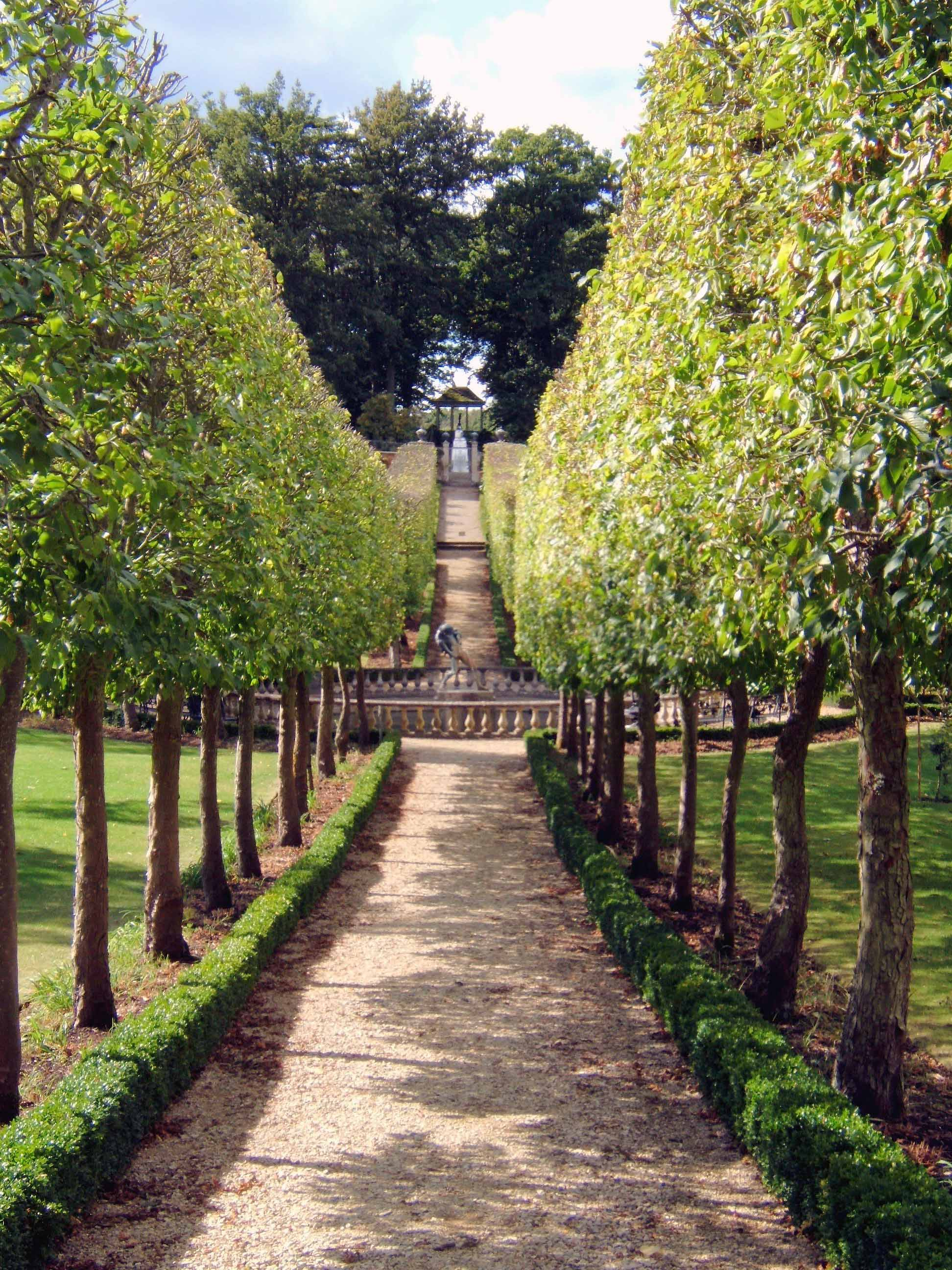
The Four seasons Garden and distant faux waterfall, the creation of the present Lord Faringdon.

During the 1940s, the 2nd Lord Faringdon formulated a plan in conjunction with Ernest Cook to present the house and its estate to the nation, under the auspices of the National Trust. A decade later, the preservation of Buscot's contents was ensured by the creation of a family trust which acquired ownership of the Henderson family's works of art and furniture which became known as the Faringdon Collection. This collection is displayed at Buscot and the family's town house in London's Brompton Square.

A stipulation in the agreement with the National Trust stated that Buscot would be leased to the Barons Faringdon, enabling them to remain in residence. This arrangement has continued to the present day. The present and 3rd Lord Faringdon, with his wife, not only lives in the house, but is responsible for the day-to-day management and decoration of the mansion. Although Lord and Lady Faringdon have built a smaller house, the Garden House, in the grounds for their personal use during the summer months when the tourist season is at its peak, the interior of the house has very much the uncontrived air of a private residence rather than that of a public art gallery.

The present Lord Faringdon has added many works of art to the collection, including contemporary paintings, ceramics, glass and silver. The house, gardens and grounds are open each year from April to September.

== Agricultural estate ==
In 1863, Robert Tertius Campbell built an irrigation scheme on the estate. His plan was to grow sugar beet and use it to produce alcohol. A distillery was opened in 1869. Campbell built a six-mile railway around the estate to collect the sugar beet and other farm produce. The railway was built to the unusual track gauge of 2 ft 8in. Three 0-4-0T locomotives were supplied by Appleby Brothers of Southwark, the first in 1871. They were named Edith, Emily and Alice, after Campbell's daughters. The estate was also provided with a telegraph system. The enterprise was profitable by 1871 but declined soon afterwards. The distillery closed in 1879 and everything saleable was sold. The railway remained in use for farm transport until about 1900 but, as the locomotives had been sold, it was worked by horses.

== Sources ==
- Bridges, Yseult (1957). How Charles Bravo Died.
- Jackson-Stops, Gervase; Pipkin, James (1988). The Country House Garden, A Grand Tour. London: Pavilion Books Ltd. ISBN 1-85145-441-1.
- Girouard, Mark (1978). Life in the English Country House. Yale University Press. ISBN 0-300-02273-5.
- Trustees of the Faringdon Collection (2004). Buscot Park & The Faringdon Collection. London: Trustees of the Faringdon Collection.
- Trustees of the Faringdon Collection (2019). Buscot Park & The Faringdon Collection. London: Trustees of the Faringdon Collection.
- Worsley, Giles (2002). England's lost Houses. London: Aurum Press. ISBN 1-85410-820-4.
- Whalley, Robin (2007). The Great Edwardian Gardens of Harold Peto. Aurum Press. ISBN 978-1845132354.
