= Baron Faringdon =

Title in the Peerage of the United Kingdom

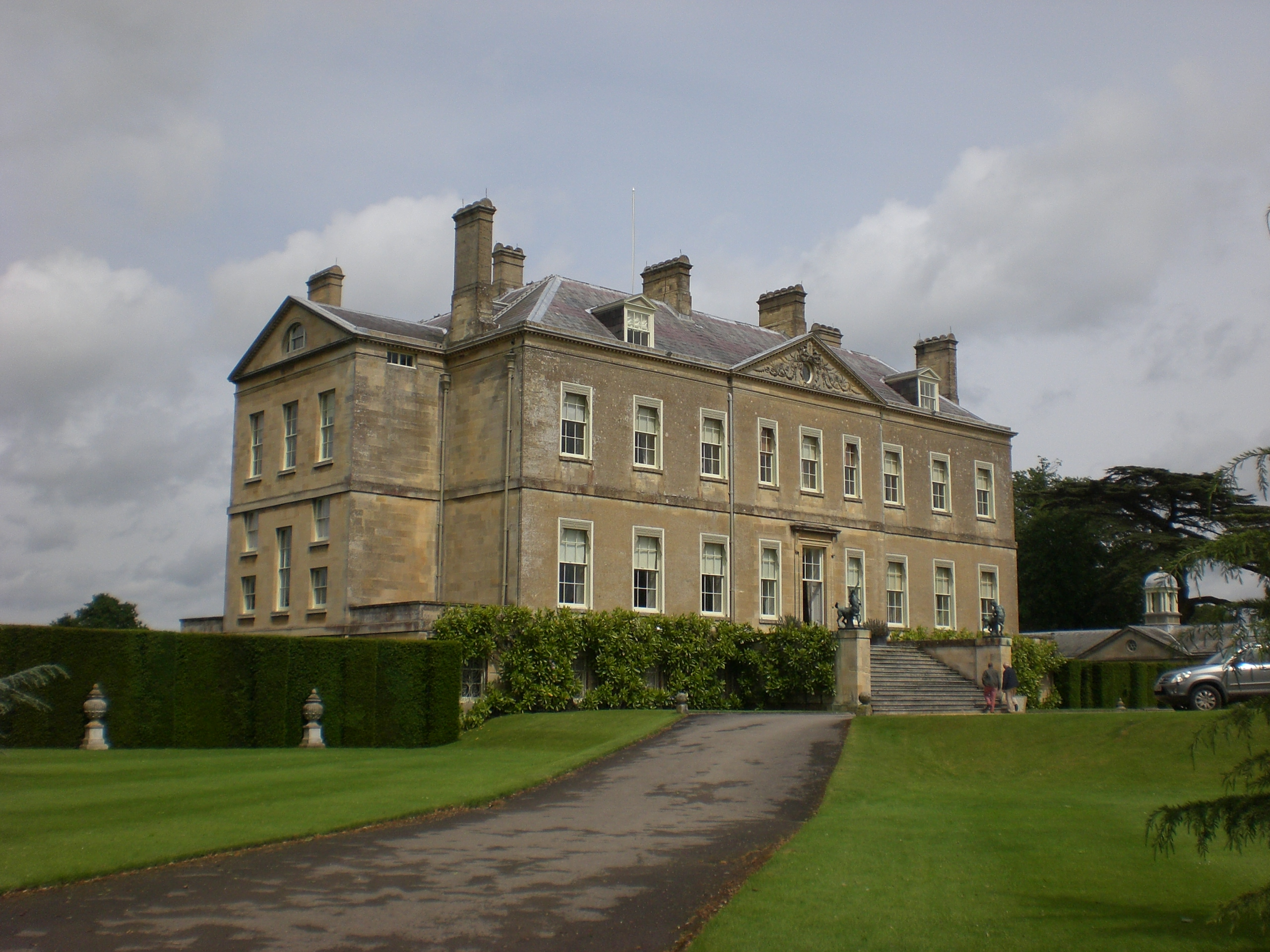
Buscot Park, the seat of the Barons Faringdon

Baron Faringdon, of Buscot Park in the County of Berkshire, is a title in the Peerage of the United Kingdom. It was created in 1916 for Sir Alexander Henderson, 1st Baronet, who had previously represented Stafford West and St George's, Hanover Square in the House of Commons as a Liberal Unionist. He had already been created a baronet in 1902. He was succeeded by his grandson, the second Baron. He was the son of the Hon. Harold Henderson, eldest son of the first Baron, who predeceased his father. Lord Faringdon was a member of the London County Council. As of 2017 the titles are held by his nephew, the third Baron, who succeeded in 1977. He is the son of the Hon. Michael Thomas Henderson, second son of the Hon. Harold Henderson.

The family seat is Buscot Park, near Faringdon, Oxfordshire.

== Barons Faringdon (1916) ==
- Alexander Henderson, 1st Baron Faringdon (1850–1934)
  - Hon. Harold Greenwood Henderson (1875–1922)
- Alexander Gavin Henderson, 2nd Baron Faringdon (1902–1977)
- Charles Michael Henderson, 3rd Baron Faringdon (b. 1937)

The heir apparent is the present holder's son, the Hon. James Harold Henderson (b. 1961).
The heir apparent's heir apparent is his son, George Alexander Henderson (b. 1992).

== Arms ==
Coat of arms of Baron Faringdon
Crest A hand holding a torteau charged with a mullet of six point Argent. Escutcheon Or three piles issuant from the sinister Vert on a chief Ermine three torteaux. Supporters Dexter a chevalier armed at all points holding in the dexter hand a lance with his lordship's pennon bearing the motto "Sursum Corda" all Proper sinister a centaur drawing his bow Proper. Motto Sola Virtus Nobilitat

Baronetage of the United Kingdom
Preceded by Evans baronets	Henderson baronets of Buscot Park; 24 July 1902	Succeeded by Hermon-Hodge baronets
