= The Forging of a Rebel =

Trilogy of Spanish books by Arturo Barea

- Author: Arturo Barea
- Language: Spanish
- Genre: Autobiography
- Publication date: 1941–1946
- English publication date: 1941–1946

The Forging of a Rebel is an autobiographical trilogy of books written by the Spanish author, broadcaster and journalist Arturo Barea. They were first published during the author's exile in the United Kingdom after the Spanish Civil War.

== Books ==
=== La Forja (The Forge) ===
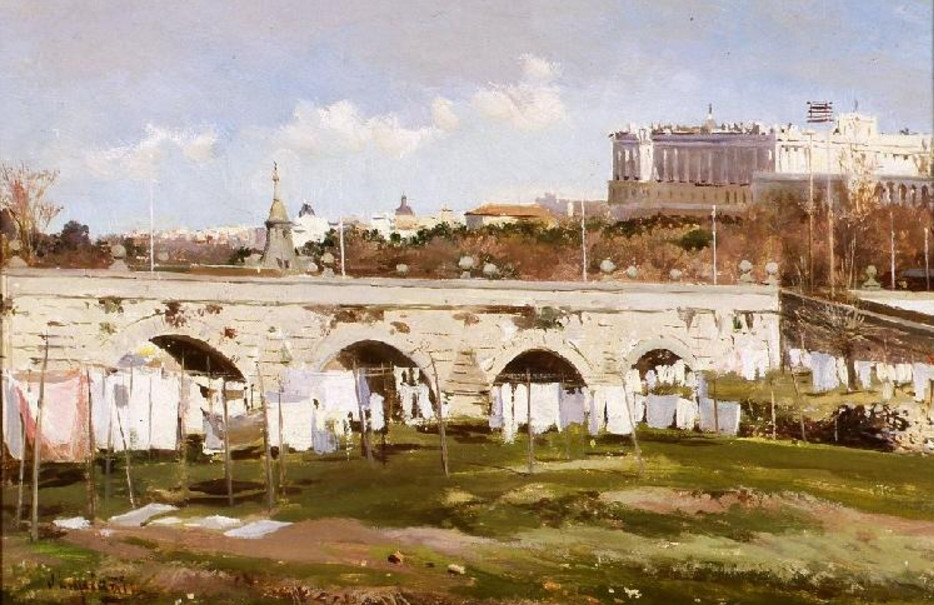
Washers next to Puente Segovia, Madrid 1900.

La Forja describes the author's childhood and youth in Madrid prior to 1914 and his early schooling in Escuelas Pías in Lavapiés. During these years his mother worked as a laundress of military clothes, by the river Manzanares. The novel describes Barea's early ambitions of becoming an engineer and his frustration with an unequal social system that forces him to terminate his education and work in various jobs such as courier, shop attendant and bank employee. He enrolls in the UGT and develops ties with fellow socialists. Much of the book's focus is on the clash of classes under the Spanish monarchy and the rigid structure of an education system dominated by religious orders. The prose records with evocative detail the nature of urban life in Madrid, as well as in the rural areas where the author's extended family lived. The book ends with the news of the outbreak of World War I.

=== La Ruta (The Track) ===
La Ruta narrates Barea's military service and his participation in the Rif War in the Spanish Protectorate of Morocco, using it as a backdrop to explain the rise of fascism. The book focuses on the events preceding and following the disaster of Annual; detailing the incompetence and corruption of the Spanish military leadership, and the lack of training and preparation of the conscripted troops who have to endure the harsh conditions of colonial warfare. Barea himself served in a regiment of military engineers, reenlisting as a regular and being promoted to the rank of sergeant. The book refers to key historic figures such as Francisco Franco or Millán Astray. "The Track" referred to in the title was a military road worked on by Barea's unit in the Moroccan hinterland. Back in Spain, emphasis is put on the coup staged by Primo de Rivera and the Army, as well as popular reaction.

=== La Llama (The Clash) ===
La Llama, the final book of the trilogy, begins with the declaration of the Second Republic and its early instabilities and quickly advances to the Civil War, paying special importance to the battle and siege of Madrid and the internal struggle of the republican government to win the war and contain the revolutionary efforts of anarchists and communists. As the war progresses, the mood of the citizens slowly declines as defeat becomes inevitable. Meanwhile, the author works as a censor and a broadcaster trying to keep morale high and avoiding news that may affect the republican cause. He resists interference by the bureaucracy and the prejudice that he and his lover Ilsa Pollak face for not being married. During the siege, the author also has met international supporters such as Ernest Hemingway. Finally, the author goes into exile with Pollak, first to France and finally the United Kingdom where he spends the rest of his life.

== Publication ==
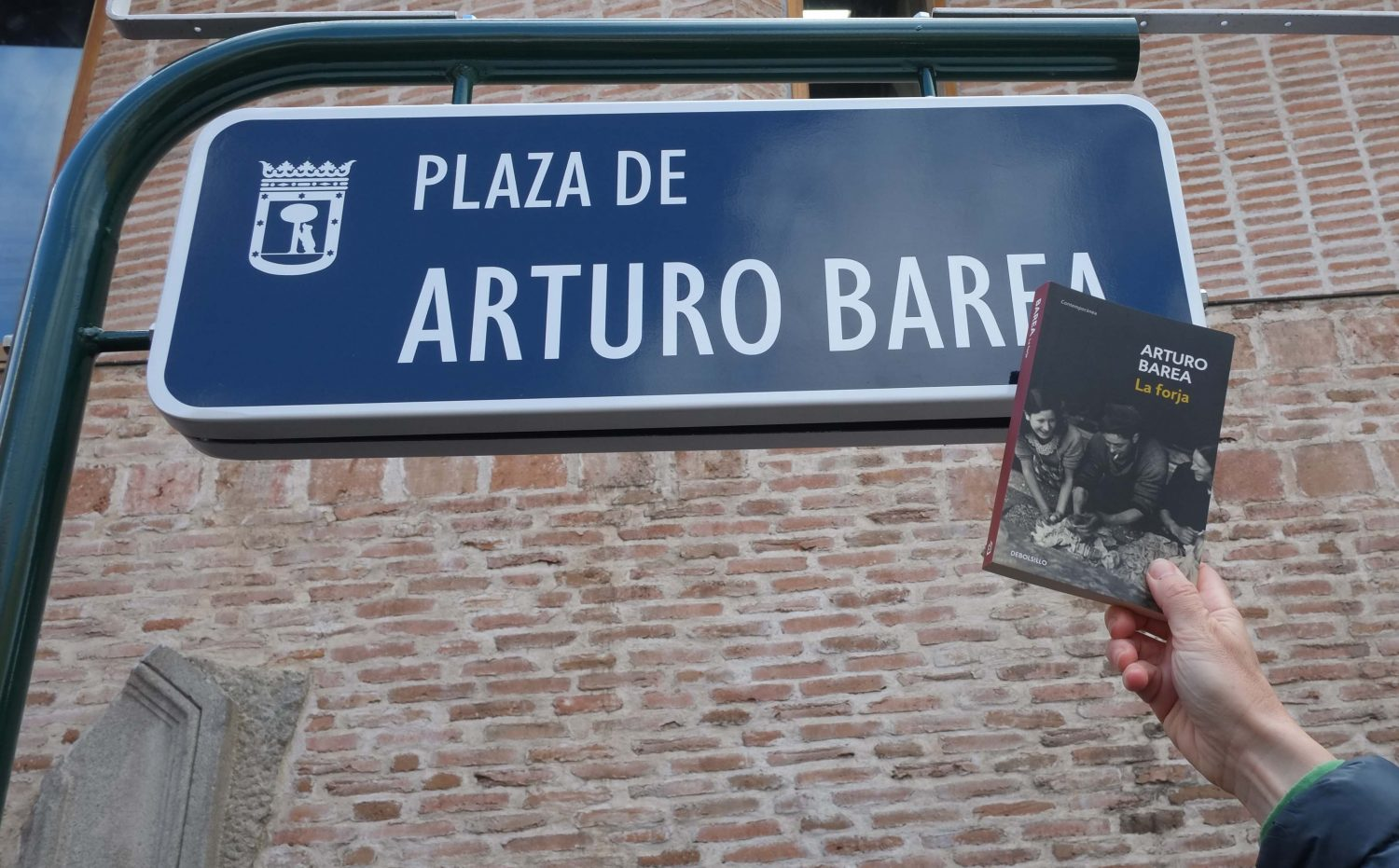
Spanish edition of the book held next to plaque signaling plaza Arturo Barea during its inauguration.

=== Origins ===
The author claimed he had always been stranded between the worlds of engineering and narration, interests that never vanished but, mainly due to circumstantial difficulties, was never able to devote his life to. It was only during the Siege of Madrid that he started seriously writing as a means of releasing the suffering and tension he experienced and saw in others. His early narrations were short stories that would later be recompiled in tomes such as "Valor y miedo" (Courage and Fear) and "El centro de la Pista" (The Center of the Path). These stories were well received among his acquaintances, especially his lover and future second wife Ilsa Pollak, whose extensive knowledge of foreign languages, being herself Austrian and speaking fluent English and French in addition to her native German, was pivotal in the translation and publication of his work.

=== First editions ===
The first edition of The Forging of a Rebel was published in English between 1941 and 1946. Written in Spanish, it was translated by Ilsa, his wife before publication. It was an instant success among critics, particularly Gabriel García Márquez and George Orwell who called The Forge: "an excellent book … Señor Barea is one of the most valuable of the literary acquisitions that England has made as a result of Fascist persecution”. Consequently, the books were soon edited in the United States and Denmark. Only in 1951 would the books be published in Spanish by the Argentinian Editorial Losada and much later, with the death of Francisco Franco and the transition to democracy, in Spain.

The prologue of the first edition includes the following comment, by Barea himself:

"Después de todo, la España que quiero enseñar al lector británico ha de ser un día parte de la paz mayor" (After all, the Spain I want to show to the British reader must be, in the future, part of the greater peace)

== Reception ==
=== Style ===
The books have been praised for their unique style and intent; trying to describe the convulsive Spanish society of the early 20th century. The author employed direct realism when describing the hardships of his own experiences and the people around him. As a matter of fact, as his social strata changed so did his world view and perception of classes and ideologies. His prose has sometimes been compared to that of Ramon Sender and Pío Baroja. He has also been praised for showing a lack of bias towards the various political factions involved and being able to perform an accurate description of his world and times.

=== TV adaptation ===
In 1990, RTVE adapted the book into a 6-episode miniseries, directed by Mario Camus, La forja de un rebelde. It became the most expensive miniseries developed by the company until then, with a total cost of 2,300 million pesetas. The series was highly regarded by critics and the public, earning a special mention in Prix Italia.

== See also ==
- Arturo Barea
