= Charles Henderson, 3rd Baron Faringdon =

British peer

Charles Michael Henderson, 3rd Baron Faringdon, KCVO (born 1937) is a British peer, stockbroker and courtier.

Henderson was born in 1937, the son of Oonagh Brassey (whose grandparents included the 5th Earl of Donoughmore) and Lt-Col. Hon. Michael Thomas Henderson (1906–1953), himself the son of Lt.-Col. Hon. Harold Greenwood Henderson, CVO (1875–1922), the MP for Abingdon (1910–16) and the younger son of the politician and financier Alexander Henderson, 1st Baron Faringdon. The first Lord Faringdon had made a fortune during the railway booms and had sold his family stock-brokerage to Cazenove & Co. in 1932.

After Eton College, Henderson was educated at Trinity College, Cambridge, graduating in 1961. In 1968, he joined Cazenove as a partner, and remained with the firm until 1996. Between 1980 and 2003, he was also chairman of Witan Investment Trust, an investment trust originally set up to manage some of the first Lord Faringdon's wealth.

Henderson succeeded his uncle as Baron Faringdon in 1977. He has held a number of public offices thereafter, serving as treasurer of the National Art Collections Fund and an English Heritage commissioner. Between 1998 and 2008, he was a Lord-in-Waiting to the Queen, and since 2014 he has been Pro-Chancellor of the University of West London.

When he retired as Lord-in-Waiting, he was appointed a Knight Commander of the Royal Victorian Order.

== Arms ==
Coat of arms of Charles Henderson, 3rd Baron Faringdon
Crest A hand holding a torteau charged with a mullet of six point Argent. Escutcheon Or three piles issuant from the sinister Vert on a chief Ermine three torteaux. Supporters Dexter a chevalier armed at all points holding in the dexter hand a lance with his lordship's pennon bearing the motto "Sursum Corda" all Proper sinister a centaur drawing his bow Proper. Motto Sola Virtus Nobilitat

Peerage of the United Kingdom
Preceded by Alexander Henderson	Baron Faringdon; 1977–present	Incumbent
