= Gavin Henderson, 2nd Baron Faringdon =

British politician (1902–1977)

The Right Honourable The Lord Faringdon
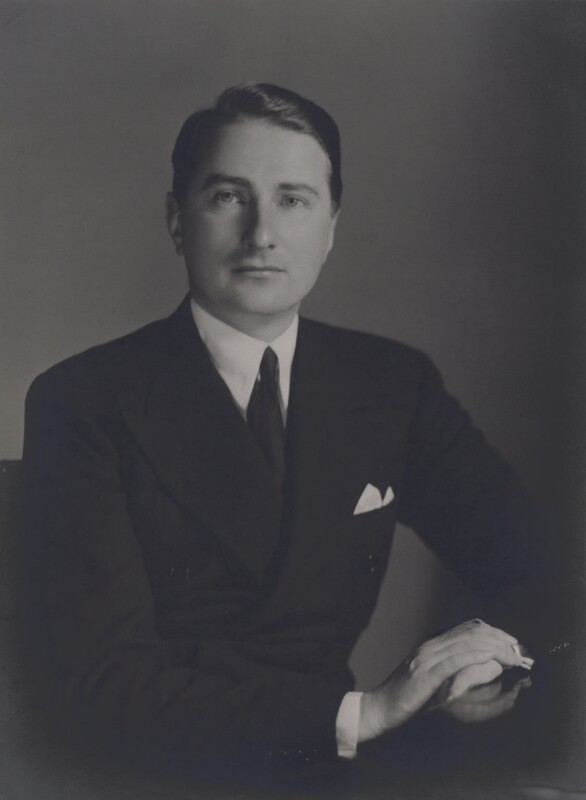
- Faringdon in 1934
- Born: 20 March 1902; London
- Died: 29 January 1977 (aged 74); London
- Resting place: Buscot Park
- Known for: Pacifism, charitable work, anti-fascism, Labour activism, Socialite, Bright Young Things
- Title: Lord, Baron,
- Political party: Labour
- Spouse: Hon. Honor Chedworth Philipps (1927–1931)
- Parent(s): Lt.-Col. Hon. Harold Greenwood Henderson & Lady Violet Charlotte Dalzell

(Alexander) Gavin Henderson, 2nd Baron Faringdon (20 March 1902 – 29 January 1977) was a British Labour politician and pacifist. He is most known for his charity work, his heavy financial support of medical aid programmes, and for housing 40 child refugees fleeing Franco's forces during the Spanish Civil War.

== Early and personal life ==
Henderson was the son of Lt-Col. the Hon. Harold Henderson and grew up in Shellingford. He was sent to Eton College, then attended McGill University in Montreal, before graduating from Christ Church, Oxford, in 1924. At Oxford he was part of the Hypocrites' Club. He is considered as one of the group designated by the tabloid press as the 'Bright Young People'.

Described by David Cargill as a "roaring pansy", Henderson was known for his effeminate demeanour, once opening a speech in the House of Lords with the words "My dears" instead of "My Lords". Historians have noted how various sources describe Henderson as a homosexual. His marriage, to the Hon. Honor Chedworth Philipps (the daughter of Owen Philipps, 1st Baron Kylsant), was childless and lasted only four years (consecrated in 1927; annulled in 1931). After his divorce, he never married again.

== Early political career ==
He succeeded to the title of 2nd Baron Faringdon, and inherited the estate of Buscot Park from his grandfather Alexander Henderson, 1st Baron Faringdon in 1934. In his early life, he had been prominent among the bright young things. In opposition to his family's strict conservative politics, Henderson joined the Labour Party in the late 1930s, and sat as a Labour peer in the House of Lords. Henderson used his position as a peer to campaign for Labour candidates on their behalf. He also joined the Parliamentary Pacifist Group.

== Experiences during the Spanish Civil War ==
Henderson was a keen supporter of the Republican cause and anti-fascist forces during the Spanish Civil War. He joined the Spanish Medical Aid Committee (SMAC) when it was first established in 1936, and later travelled to Spain to visit numerous front-line hospitals. During the war, Henderson donated his Rolls-Royce car and had it converted into a makeshift ambulance to serve republicans and anti-fascists. This ambulance saw frequent use and was in action during the Battle of Teruel where it was used to evacuate people with serious abdominal wounds. Henderson's Rolls-Royce ambulance, though heavily damaged and covered in bullet holes, survived the war and was shipped back to Britain in September 1938. The ambulance was then displayed at a conference for officials of the UK Trades Union Congress (TUC), where it was used to raise monetary funds for Spanish medical programmes.

After the collapse of the Spanish Republican forces, Henderson was involved in the evacuation of Quakers and workers from Save the Children at the British built port of Gandia. Henderson stood at the entrance of the port and laid a Union Jack at the entrance, refusing to allow entry to an army patrol of the fascist forces, claiming that the port was "British territory".

== Later career and charitable work ==
Henderson returned to the UK after the Spanish Civil War and continued to use his political position to campaign on behalf of Republican causes. Together with the help of other public figures including Peter Churchill and Sir Stafford Cripps, Henderson led a left-wing organisation known as the Friends of the Spanish People (FSP), and helped to run their newspaper, Spanish News. In March 1938, Henderson had given several cottages and his lodge on Buscot Park estate to house 40 Spanish refugee children, and later several notable Spanish exiles including Arturo Barea Ogazon.

Henderson's pacificist beliefs exempted him from fighting in WWII, instead he served in both the London Fire Brigade, and Bristol, during World War II. During his time with the London Fire Brigade, he once entered the House of Lords whilst still wearing his fireman's uniform.

Post-war he was a prominent member of the Fabian Society, and also served on the London County Council. He was elected as a councillor on 16 April 1958 for the Woolwich West division but was defeated by a Conservative at the 1961 election. Following his defeat, he was appointed an alderman, a post he held until 1965. Henderson became an authority on Georgian architecture and spent the remainder of his life working to preserve historic British buildings, most notably British country homes. He also then served on the Greater London Council's Historic Buildings Committee.

Gavin Henderson died in 1977 without issue, and was succeeded by his nephew Charles Michael Henderson as 3rd Baron Faringdon.

== Arms ==
Coat of arms of Gavin Henderson, 2nd Baron Faringdon
Crest A hand holding a torteau charged with a mullet of six point Argent. Escutcheon Or three piles issuant from the sinister Vert on a chief Ermine three torteaux. Supporters Dexter a chevalier armed at all points holding in the dexter hand a lance with his lordship's pennon bearing the motto "Sursum Corda" all Proper sinister a centaur drawing his bow Proper. Motto Sola Virtus Nobilitat

Peerage of the United Kingdom
Preceded by Alexander Henderson	Baron Faringdon; 1934–1977	Succeeded by Charles Michael Henderson
Party political offices
Preceded by Billy Hughes	Chairman of the Fabian Society; 1960–1961	Succeeded by Anthony Crosland
