= Buscot =

Village in Oxfordshire, England

Coordinates: 51.677°N 01.667°W

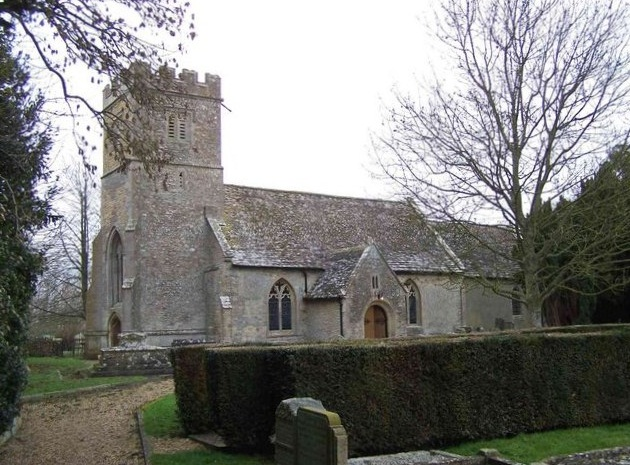
- St Mary's parish church

- Location within Oxfordshire
- Area: 11.58 km^{2} (4.47 sq mi)
- Population: 173 (2011 census)
  - Density: 15/km^{2} (39/sq mi)
- OS grid reference: SU2397
- Civil parish: Buscot
- District: Vale of White Horse
- Shire county: Oxfordshire
- Region: South East
- Country: England
- Sovereign state: United Kingdom
- Post town: Faringdon
- Postcode district: SN7
- Dialling code: 01367
- Police: Thames Valley
- Fire: Oxfordshire
- Ambulance: South Central
- UK Parliament: Witney
- Website: Buscot Parish Council

Buscot is an English village and civil parish on the River Thames, about 1.5 miles (2.4 km) south-east of Lechlade. Buscot was part of Berkshire until the 1974 boundary changes transferred it to Oxfordshire. Two houses there contain notable collections of paintings.

== Amenities and sights ==
Many of the properties are owned by the National Trust and let to long-term residents, some of whom work the farms surrounding the village. There is a village hall, tea shop and adjacent car park, and a children's playground. In the parish, Buscot Park houses the notable Faringdon Collection of paintings, an Italian water garden, and a walled vegetable garden and fruit orchards. A short walk from the end of the village leads past Buscot Weir field to Buscot Lock on the River Thames. The Old Parsonage, built in 1701, was sold by the Church Commissioners to the author Peter Francis Carew Stucley, who in turn left it in his will to the National Trust in 1964. It still contains Stucley's collection of contemporary paintings acquired in the 1950s and 1960s. The house is open by appointment.

== Parish church ==
The Church of England parish church of Saint Mary was built in about 1200. The stained glass in the east window of the chancel was made by Edward Burne-Jones in 1891. The bell tower has a ring of four bells, the oldest of which was cast at Bristol in about 1399. The treble bell was cast by Thomas Gefferies of Bristol in about 1520. A further bell was cast by William and Robert Cor of Aldbourne in Wiltshire in 1708. The ring was completed by the addition of the present tenor bell, cast by Mears & Stainbank of the Whitechapel Bell Foundry in 1891. St Mary's also has a service bell, cast by Edward Neale of Burford in 1661.

== Sources ==
- Page, W.H.; Ditchfield, P.H., eds. (1924). A History of the County of Berkshire, Volume 4. Victoria County History. pp. 512–517.
- Pevsner, Nikolaus (1966). Berkshire. The Buildings of England. Harmondsworth: Penguin Books. pp. 108–109.
