= Parliamentary constituencies in North Yorkshire =

List of Parliamentary constituencies in North Yorkshire, England

The county of North Yorkshire, together with the unitary authority of York, is divided into nine parliamentary constituencies: one borough constituency and eight county constituencies, two of which are partly in West Yorkshire.

== Constituencies ==
† Conservative ‡ Labour ¤ Liberal Democrat

Constituency (Note: BC denotes borough constituency, CC denotes county constituency.)	Electorate	Majority (Note: The majority is the number of votes the winning candidate receives more than their nearest rival.)	Member of Parliament	Nearest opposition	Map
Harrogate and Knaresborough CC	77,955	8,238	Tom Gordon¤	Andrew Jones†	
Richmond and Northallerton CC	73,886	12,185	Rishi Sunak†	Tom Wilson‡	
Scarborough and Whitby CC	74,558	5,408	Alison Hume‡	Roberto Weeden-Sanz†	
Selby CC (part)	78,043	10,195	Keir Mather‡	Charles Richardson†	
Skipton and Ripon CC	79,251	1,650	Julian Smith†	Malcolm Birks‡	
Thirsk and Malton CC	78,468	7,550	Kevin Hollinrake†	Lisa Banes‡	
Wetherby and Easingwold CC (part)	74,314	4,846	Alec Shelbrooke†	Ben Pickles‡	
York Central BC	79,557	19,154	Rachael Maskell‡	Richard Hudson†	
York Outer CC	76,228	9,391	Luke Charters‡	Julian Sturdy†	

=== 2024 ===
See 2023 review of Westminster constituencies for further details.

Former name
1. Harrogate and Knaresborough CC
2. Richmond (Yorks) CC
3. Scarborough and Whitby CC
4. Selby and Ainsty CC
5. Skipton and Ripon CC
6. Thirsk and Malton CC
7. York Central BC
8. York Outer CC
Boundaries 2010–2024

Constituencies in North Yorkshire (2010-2024)

Current name
1. Harrogate and Knaresborough CC
2. Richmond and Northallerton CC
3. Scarborough and Whitby CC
4. Selby CC
5. Skipton and Ripon CC
6. Thirsk and Malton CC
7. Wetherby and Easingwold CC
8. York Central BC
9. York Outer CC
Boundaries 2024–present

Constituencies in North Yorkshire (2024-present)

For the 2023 review of Westminster constituencies, which redrew the constituency map ahead of the 2024 United Kingdom general election, the Boundary Commission for England opted to combine North Yorkshire with West Yorkshire as a sub-region of the Yorkshire and the Humber Region, resulting in the creation of two new cross-county boundary constituencies: Selby which comprises the majority of the abolished constituency of Selby and Ainsty and includes the City of Leeds ward of Kippax and Methley; and a new constituency named Wetherby and Easingwold which includes the City of Leeds wards of Harewood and Wetherby. The commission also opted to rename Richmond (Yorks) to Richmond and Northallerton.

The following constituencies resulted from the review:

Containing electoral wards from Craven

- Skipton and Ripon (part)

Containing electoral wards from Hambleton

- Richmond and Northallerton (part)
- Thirsk and Malton (part)
- Weatherby and Easingwold (part)^{1}

Containing electoral wards from Harrogate

- Harrogate and Knaresborough
- Skipton and Ripon (part)
- Weatherby and Easingwold (part)^{1}

Containing electoral wards from Richmondshire

- Richmond and Northallerton (part)

Containing electoral wards from Ryedale

- Thirsk and Malton (part)

Containing electoral wards from Scarborough

- Scarborough and Whitby
- Thirsk and Malton CC (part)

Containing electoral wards from Selby

- Selby (part also in the City of Leeds in West Yorkshire)
- Weatherby and Easingwold (part)^{1}

Containing electoral wards from York

- York Central
- York Outer

^{1} also contains parts in the City of Leeds in West Yorkshire

=== 2010 ===
Under the fifth periodic review of Westminster constituencies, the Boundary Commission for England decided that North Yorkshire should continue to be divided into 8 constituencies for the 2010 general election, but the boundaries were extensively redrawn in the south-eastern part to accommodate exactly two seats wholly within the recently formed unitary authority of York. The Vale of York was abolished and a new constituency named York Outer created, with City of York being renamed York Central. Ryedale was succeeded by Thirsk and Malton, and Selby was renamed Selby and Ainsty.

Former name
1. City of York BC
2. Harrogate and Knaresborough BC
3. Richmond (Yorks) CC
4. Ryedale CC
5. Scarborough and Whitby CC
6. Selby CC
7. Skipton and Ripon CC
8. Vale of York CC
Boundaries 1997–2010

Parliamentary constituencies in North Yorkshire

Current name
1. Harrogate and Knaresborough CC
2. Richmond (Yorks) CC
3. Scarborough and Whitby CC
4. Selby and Ainsty CC
5. Skipton and Ripon CC
6. Thirsk and Malton CC
7. York Central BC
8. York Outer CC
Boundaries 2010–present

Proposed Revised constituencies in North Yorkshire

== Results history ==
Primary data source: House of Commons research briefing – General election results from 1918 to 2019

=== 2024 ===
The number of votes cast for each political party who fielded candidates in constituencies comprising North Yorkshire, including the two cross-county constituencies of Selby and Wetherby and Easingwold in the 2024 general election were as follows:

Party	Votes	%	Change from 2019	Seats	Change from 2019
Labour	148,199	33.4%	▲7.9%	4	▲3
Conservative	141,867	32.0%	▼24.4%	4	▼3
Liberal Democrats	53,460	12.0%	▼2.7%	1	▲1
Greens	26,381	5.9%	▲3.3%	0	Steady
Reform	67,443	15.2%	▲14.9%	0	Steady
Others	6,618	1.5%	▼1.0%	0	Steady
Total	440,946	100.0		9	▲1

=== Percentage votes ===
Election year	1979	1983	1987	1992	1997	2001	2005	2010	2015	2017	2019	2024
Labour	38.3	16.3	19.0	23.6	32.8	29.6	27.9	19.0	22.2	34.1	25.5	33.4
Conservative	46.9	56.1	53.1	52.8	40.0	43.6	43.7	46.8	48.5	54.1	54.4	32.0
Reform^{1}	–	–	–	–	–	–	–	–	–	–	0.3	15.2
Liberal Democrat^{2}	13.9	27.4	27.5	22.9	23.0	23.5	24.7	27.8	9.2	7.3	14.7	12.0
Green Party	–	–	*	*	*	*	*	1.0	5.1	1.9	2.6	5.9
UKIP	–	–	–	–	*	*	*	2.7	13.2	1.1	*	*
Other	0.9	0.2	0.4	0.7	4.2	3.4	3.7	2.7	1.9	1.5	2.5	

^{1}2019 – Brexit Party
^{2}1983 & 1987 – SDP–Liberal Alliance 1979 – Liberal
1979 – Historic county

* Included in Other

=== Seats ===
Election year	1983	1987	1992	1997	2001	2005	2010	2015	2017	2019	2024
Conservative	7	7	6	4	4	5	7	7	7	7	4
Labour	0	0	1	3	3	2	1	1	1	1	4
Liberal Democrat^{1}	0	0	0	1	1	1	0	0	0	0	1
Total	7	7	7	8	8	8	8	8	8	8	9

^{1}1983 & 1987 – SDP–Liberal Alliance

=== Maps ===
==== 1885–1910 – North Riding of Yorkshire ====
1885

1886

1892

1895

1900

1906

Jan 1910

Dec 1910

==== 1918–1945 ====
1918

1922

1923

1924

1929

1931

1935

1945

==== 1950–1979 ====
1950

1951

1955

1959

1964

1966

1970

Feb 1974

Oct 1974

1979

==== 1983–present – North Yorkshire ====
1983

1987

1992

1997

2001

2005

2010

2015

2017

2019

2024

== Historical representation by party ==
Data given here is for the North Riding of Yorkshire until 1983, and includes the city of York throughout. A cell marked → (with a different colour background to the preceding cell) indicates that the previous MP continued to sit under a new party name.

=== 1885 to 1918 ===
Conservative Independent Labour Liberal Liberal-Labour

Constituency	1885	1886	1892	93	1895	97	98	00	1900	02	05	1906	Jan 1910	Dec 1910	15
Cleveland	H. Pease					A. Pease				Samuel					
Middlesbrough	I. Wilson		J. Wilson	→					Sadler			J. Wilson	Williams		
Richmond (Yorks)	Milbank	Elliot			Hutton							Dyke Acland	Orde-Powlett		
Scarborough	Sitwell	J. Rowntree	Sitwell		Compton-Rickett							Rea			
Thirsk and Malton	Dawnay		Lawson									Duncombe			Turton
Whitby	E. Beckett										Buxton	G. Beckett			
York	A. Pease		Butcher									Greenwood	A. Rowntree		
York	Lockwood						Beresford	Faber					Butcher		

=== 1918 to 1950 ===
Conservative Independent Labour Liberal

Constituency	1918	1922	1923	1924	28	1929	31	1931	1935	37	40	41	45	1945	48	49
Cleveland	Goff		Starmer	Goff		Mansfield		Bower						Willey		
Middlesbrough East	Williams	Brown	Williams	Wilkinson				Young	Edwards						→	→
Middlesbrough West	Thomson				Griffith						Johnstone		Bennett	Cooper		
Richmond (Yorks)	Wilson					Dugdale										
Scarborough and Whitby	Beckett	Herbert					Latham					Spearman				
Thirsk and Malton	E. Turton					R. Turton										
York	Butcher		Marriott			Burgess		Lumley		Wood				Corlett		

=== 1950 to 1983 ===
Conservative Labour Social Democratic

Constituency	1950	1951	52	1955	1959	62	1964	1966	1970	Feb 1974	Oct 1974	1979	81
Cleveland / Cleveland and Whitby (1974)	Willey		Palmer		Proudfoot		Tinn			Brittan			
Middlesbrough East / Middlesbrough (1974)	Marquand					Bottomley							
Middlesbrough West / Thornaby (1974)	Cooper	Simon				Bray			Sutcliffe	Wrigglesworth			→
Redcar										Tinn			
Richmond (Yorks)	Dugdale				Kitson								
Scarborough and Whitby / Scarborough (1974)	Spearman							Shaw					
Thirsk and Malton	Turton									Spence			
York	Hylton-Foster				Longbottom			Lyon					

=== 1983 to present ===
Conservative Labour Liberal Liberal Democrats

Constituency	1983	86	1987	89	1992	1997	2001	2005	2010	2015	2017	2019	23	2024
Harrogate / H'gate & Knaresborough (1997)	Banks					Willis			Jones					Gordon
Richmond (Yorks) / R. & Northallerton (2024)	Brittan			Hague						Sunak				
Ryedale / Thirsk and Malton (2010)	Spence	Shields	Greenway						McIntosh	Hollinrake				
Scarborough / Scarboro' & Whitby (1997)	Shaw				Sykes	Quinn		Goodwill						Hume
Selby^{1} / Selby and Ainsty (2010–2024)	Alison					Grogan			Adams				Mather	
Skipton and Ripon	Watson		Curry						Smith					
Vale of York / York Outer (2010)						McIntosh			Sturdy					Charters
York / York Central (2010)	Gregory				Bayley					Maskell				
Wetherby & Easingwold^{1}														Shelbrooke

^{1}also includes some parts of West Yorkshire since 2024

== See also ==
- Parliamentary constituencies in Yorkshire and the Humber
- List of parliamentary constituencies in Cleveland for those covering Middlesbrough, Redcar and Cleveland and Stockton-on-Tees in the ceremonial county of North Yorkshire.
