= Radio 270 =

Pirate radio station broadcasting to England

Scarborough, North Yorkshire; England
- Frequency: 1115 kHz (269 metres)

Programming
- Language: English
- Format: Top 40, Light music

Ownership
- Owner: Ellambar Investments Ltd; (Radio 270)

History
- First air date: June 9, 1966
- Last air date: August 14, 1967; 57 years ago (1 year, 66 days)

Technical information
- Power: 10 kW

Radio 270 was a pirate radio station serving Yorkshire and the North East of England from 1966 to 1967. It broadcast from a converted Dutch lugger called Oceaan 7 positioned in international waters off Scarborough, North Yorkshire followed by a move to a more sheltered position off Bridlington.

== Origins ==
In 1965 a group of Yorkshire businessmen formed a consortium to establish an offshore radio station to broadcast to the North East coast from a location off Scarborough. Don Robinson, aged 28, who was an entertainments promoter, began the venture with Bill Pashby (a fishing boat skipper), Roland Hill (a poultry farmer) and Leonard Dale (owner of the Dale Electrics business at Gristhorpe). These recruited Wilf Proudfoot, owner of a chain of supermarkets and a former Conservative MP. The venture was incorporated within a public company named Ellambar Investments Ltd.

In late 1965, Proudfoot addressed a public meeting at a Scarborough hotel in which he invited the public to subscribe for shares in the business. He indicated that the venture was a high risk one and that nobody should expect a commercial return on the money they put in. Around sixty people did subscribe with the largest single shareholding being held by Proudfoot himself. Leonard Dale became Chairman of the company while Proudfoot became its managing director.

Don Robinson and Bill Pashby both initially occupied prominent roles in what soon became known as Radio 270. Robinson prepared the first programme plan for the station which adopted a mixture of light music and lifestyle material. It was intended to provide an "up-market" offering which would compete directly with the BBC's Light Programme. Pashby was the station's first "Maritime Director" and it was he that picked out a suitable vessel for use as a broadcasting platform and supervised its fitting out.

However, the business side of the operation fell increasingly under the control of Wilf Proudfoot. The station's management was run from an office in the Scalby Road, Scarborough headquarters of the Proudfoot supermarket business. The station's office manager was Maggie Lucas, a long-standing associate of Proudfoot who had acted as his secretary when he had been the Member of Parliament for Cleveland from 1959 to 1964. Proudfoot became uncomfortable with the planned programming and he engaged the services of Noel Miller as Programme Director. Miller had previous experience of commercial radio in Australia and he adopted a simple style of programming based on a Top 40 format.

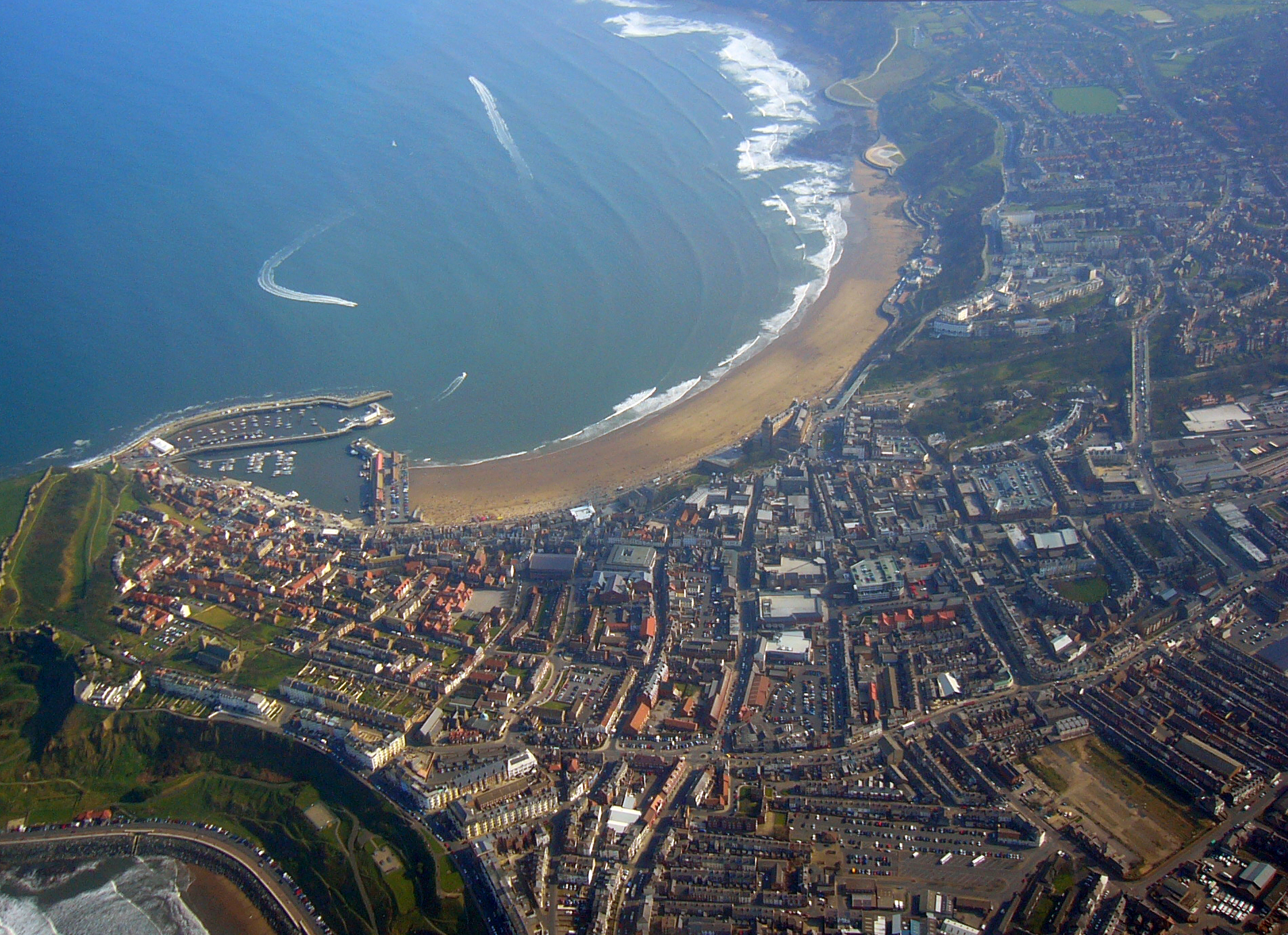
An aerial view of Scarborough: South Bay, with fishing harbour to the left

A planned opening date of 1 April 1966 had to be abandoned when the station's vessel, Oceaan 7, shed its radio mast. However, the station finally opened in 9 June, broadcasting on 1115 kilohertz, 269 metres, in the medium wave. This wavelength was used by some existing radio stations in southern and eastern Europe but these were too far away for Radio 270 to cause them any trouble. However, the frequency was close to Radio London on 1133 kHz, resulting in the potential for mutual interference on radios with less precise tuning.

The initial results were highly successful. The station's broadcasts could be received over a large tract of eastern England from Newcastle in the north to Nottingham in the south.

The station charged £30 for a 30-second advertising spot. It was very successful in attracting advertising for local businesses and events in the North Yorkshire area. The largest single paying advertiser was the Worldwide Church of God which purchased a nightly 30-minute slot for a fee of around £300 per week. This covered most of Radio 270's payroll. The nightly "god slot" contained the preaching of evangelist Garner Ted Armstrong.

The second largest advertiser was the Proudfoot supermarket business. This created a complex financial situation in which there were two-way transfer charges between Radio 270 and Proudfoot for reciprocal services rendered.

== Oceaan 7 ==
In 1965, the promoters of Radio 270 identified a Dutch built fishing lugger named Oceaan VII as being suitable for their purposes. This was acquired for £2,500.

The Oceaan VII was built in the Netherlands in 1939 and had spent most of its life operating out of the Belgian port of Antwerp. During World War II it had been commandeered by the German occupation authorities. It was approximately 118 feet long and 160 tonnes in displacement. The vessel was refitted in the east coast port of Grimsby before being brought to Scarborough where it was renamed Oceaan 7. The refit involved the addition of 20 tonnes of permanent ballast in the hull in order to give extra stability. The vessel was fitted with a 150 feet high radio mast and a 10 kW RCA BTA 10J1 transmitter.

Oceaan 7 off Scarborough in 1966

There were two studios on board, one for presenting programmes and one for news. Accommodation for crew and broadcasting staff was both confined and spartan. Living quarters consisted of a bunk room with a dining table in the middle. Food was provided from a communal galley. The entire cost of acquiring and fitting out the vessel was £75,000. The crewing was initially planned to be on a one-month rotation basis. The ship's entire eight-man crew including the captain were switched every month. Broadcasting staff, including disc jockeys, initially worked on a two-week rotation basis.

The Oceaan 7 was among the smallest of the pirate radio ships at that time. By way of comparison, Radio London broadcast from the 650 tonne MV Galaxy positioned in the Thames estuary. Oceaan 7's initial location off Scarborough allowed its signal to be widely received over the North of England but left the vessel totally exposed to storms in the North Sea.

Oceaan 7 was registered in Honduras in the name of Radio 270's Programme Director Noel Miller (an Australian national). This effectively placed the vessel beyond the reach of the British authorities. Most pirate radio ships were kept supplied from shore by tender. However Oceaan 7's small size allowed it to periodically enter Bridlington and Scarborough harbours for re-supply purposes. The visits to harbour were usually carried out in the early hours of the morning in order to avoid disruption to broadcasting and to minimise the chances of intervention by the authorities.

== Operations, 1966 to 1967 ==
Radio 270 car window sticker from 1967

Although Radio 270 quickly established itself as a successful local radio station, its affairs soon became complicated. Various factors contributed to this.

Oceaan 7 was very small for the purpose to which it was being put. The cramped living accommodation and lack of privacy on board soon caused tensions among the personnel. It proved difficult to maintain the vessel in position off Scarborough as the winter storms came. On 28 October 1966 a bomb hoax was received, by post with no stamps. All unstamped mail was refused by 270 so the Post Office received the letter and handed it to the police. Contact was made with the ship but a full search found nothing. In November 1966 one storm was so severe that waves were breaking over the vessel's deck and water entered the living quarters and studio.

The set-up was undeniably dismal. The memories consist largely of trying to sleep in a curtained-off bunk actually in the messroom and trying to broadcast! Despite having cut my teeth on Radio Essex beforehand, I was for some strange reason feeling like a fish-out-of-water in this more ego-driven environment

— Roger Scott, briefly a disc jockey on Radio 270, from the history of Radio 270

Conditions of employment and rates of pay were not generous. Consequently, there were a series of disputes with personnel and staff turnover rates became high. Matters came to a head after the November storm when Proudfoot was approached by three disc jockeys (including the 19 year old Andy Kirk) with a demand that Oceaan 7 should move its station to a more sheltered location in Bridlington Bay or put into harbour whenever bad weather threatened. Kirk had previously conveyed his concerns about safety to the local press. Proudfoot summarily dismissed all three of the DJs.

A number of the shareholders now became restless and two attempts were made to oust Proudfoot from his post of managing director. Both of these attempts failed. Bill Pashby resigned as Maritime Director "...fed up with the continuous sackings of the crew". Proudfoot eventually responded to these concerns by moving Oceaan 7's position to Bridlington Bay while moving to a one-week staff rotation for most on-board personnel. The move to Bridlington Bay gave more settled conditions but it worsened reception of Radio 270's signal across large parts of its audience catchment area.

The living conditions on the Radio 270 ship were not pleasant. It was extremely cramped. To add to their discomfort, some of the DJs were prone to sea-sickness. Paul Burnett even endured the ultimate indignity of throwing up live on air (while reading a commercial for Proudfoot bacon). There was a high turnover of disc-jockeys and a certain amount of technical trouble, both of which upset the investors. On a couple of occasions Wilf Proudfoot had to contend with stormy shareholders meetings. However he survived their attempts to oust him.

— from the history of Radio 270

By early 1967, Radio 270's affairs seemed to be stabilising and it was reported that the station was breaking-even financially.

== Close down ==
The pirate radio stations attracted opposition from within the British political establishment. It was claimed that their broadcasts interfered with emergency service communications, and this led to enactment of the Marine, &c., Broadcasting (Offences) Act 1967, which took effect at midnight on 14 August of that year. This act prohibited the management, funding, support or supply of pirate radio ships from the British mainland.

The pirate stations campaigned against the Act during the early months of 1967. Radio 270 was prominent in this campaign and its contributions to the campaign took on an overtly political dimension. A group of Conservative MPs and activists became involved with Radio 270. These included the MP for Beverley, Patrick Wall. The station gave airtime to a number of political causes including a broadcast by Wall in which he advocated British recognition of the white minority UDI regime in Rhodesia. Radio 270 broadcast advertisements supporting Conservative party candidates in the Scarborough municipal elections of 1967. Harvey Proctor, then Chairman of the University of York Conservative Society, made regular half-hour current affairs broadcasts. Proctor went on to have a controversial career as a Conservative MP and prominent member of the Conservative Monday Club.

This appeared to harden the Labour government's resolve to deal with the pirates. Postmaster-General Edward Short stated about Radio 270 that "It is the first time in peacetime that this country has been subjected to a stream of misleading propaganda from outside our territorial waters and I do not think this is a matter for joking".

As 14 August approached, it was initially suggested that Radio 270 could continue broadcasting but with Oceaan 7 being supplied from the Netherlands and the station's management being shifted to that country. However, it was soon realised that this was not a viable option. DJ Vince "Rusty" Allen closed the station at one minute to midnight on 14 August 1967 with the playing of the national anthem.

== Aftermath ==
On 15 August Oceaan 7 sailed up the coast to Whitby. It was laid up there whilst a buyer was sought. Various enquiries were received from prospective buyers including one from the operators of Radio Caroline, whose own ships had been seized by creditors. However, none of these enquiries resulted in a sale. The transmitter and other broadcasting equipment from Radio 270 were placed in storage and in 1970 found their way to the Dutch-based pirate Capital Radio (which had no connection to the later British radio station of the same name). Oceaan 7 was scrapped in 1969.

The proceeds from the disposal of the vessel and its equipment raised a total of around £12,500. By the time creditors had been paid off there was no cash available to allow a significant return of capital to the Radio 270 shareholders.

Wilf Proudfoot stood as the Conservative candidate in the marginal West Yorkshire constituency of Brighouse and Spenborough, where he ousted the sitting Labour MP Colin Jackson by a majority of only 59 votes. The closure of the pirate radio stations is believed to have been a key issue in a number of marginal seats. Proudfoot himself lost his seat in the February 1974 general election. Thereafter he spent some time in the USA where he trained as a hypnotist in Los Angeles. He later established the Proudfoot School of Clinical Hypnotism and Psychotherapy based in Scarborough.

Don Robinson continued his career as an events promoter and entrepreneur. He is credited with having saved Hull City football club from extinction in 1982 when he bought the club out of receivership. As club chairman from 1982 to 1989 he presided over a revival in the club's financial and football fortunes that saw it enjoy a series of league promotions.

Many former Radio 270 staff, such as Roger Gale, Paul Burnett and Philip Hayton subsequently worked in mainstream broadcasting. The station's office manager, Maggie Lucas, went on to become secretary to the Chairman of the Australian Broadcasting Corporation. Roger Gale became a long serving Conservative MP and in 2021 was the first MP to confirm he had submitted a letter of no confidence in British Prime Minister Boris Johnson.
