= 1950 Brighouse and Spenborough by-election =

UK parliamentary by-election

The 1950 Brighouse and Spenborough by-election was a parliamentary by-election held in the United Kingdom on 4 May 1950 for the House of Commons in the marginal constituency of Brighouse and Spenborough. The seat became vacant on the death of Frederick Cobb, who had been the local Member of Parliament (MP) for only 3 months, since the general election in February 1950. He had previously been the MP for Elland from 1945.

The result was a narrow hold for the Labour Party. The winning candidate was John Edwards, former Parliamentary Secretary to the Board of Trade, who had lost his seat in the general election. He went on to hold Brighouse and Spenborough until his death in 1959, when the resulting by-election in 1960 was narrowly won by the Conservative and National Liberal candidate Michael Shaw.

Brighouse and Spenborough by-election, 1950
Party	Candidate	Votes	%	±%
Labour	John Edwards	24,004	50.5	−1.71
National Liberal	William Woolley	23,567	49.5	+1.71
Majority		437	0.91	−3.43
Turnout		47,571	85.4	−2.6
Labour hold		Swing	−1.71	

== See also ==
- 1960 Brighouse and Spenborough by-election
- List of United Kingdom by-elections
