= Lord Shaw =

Lord Shaw may refer to:

- Thomas Shaw, 1st Baron Craigmyle (1850–1937), Scottish Liberal Party politician and judge
- Michael Shaw, Baron Shaw of Northstead (1920–2021), British National Liberal and Conservative Party politician
