= 1960 Brighouse and Spenborough by-election =

UK parliamentary by-election

A 1960 by-election was held for the British House of Commons constituency of Brighouse and Spenborough on 17 March 1960. The seat became vacant following the death on 23 November 1959 of the Labour Party Member of Parliament Lewis John Edwards, who had held the seat since a by-election in 1950, but whose majority had been cut to only 47 votes at the 1959 general election.

The result was a narrow gain for the Conservative and National Liberal candidate; in 1950, the National Liberal Party, once strong in the constituency, had merged with the Conservatives. Michael Shaw, who won the election, had been the defeated candidate in 1959. However, Colin Jackson (the Labour candidate at the by-election) would go on to regain the seat for his party at the 1964 general election. Shaw went on to represent Scarborough from 1966 to February 1974, as a Conservative, and the seat of Scarborough and Whitby from then until 1992, when he stood down.

This was the first seat gained by an incumbent government at a by-election since the 1953 Sunderland South by-election. Other than the special circumstances of the 1961 Bristol South-East by-election, awarded to the Conservatives by an Election Court, this feat was not repeated until the 1982 Mitcham and Morden by-election. The only other examples of a government by-election gain in the post-war period have been the 2017 Copeland by-election and the 2021 Hartlepool by-election.

Brighouse and Spenborough by-election, 1960
| Party | Candidate | Votes | % | ±% |
|---|---|---|---|---|
| National Liberal | Michael Shaw | 22,472 | 50.8 | +0.9 |
| Labour | Colin Jackson | 21,806 | 49.2 | −0.9 |
| Majority | | 666 | 1.6 | N/A |
| Turnout | | 44,278 | | |
| National Liberal gain from Labour | | Swing | +0.8 | |

== See also ==
- 1950 Brighouse and Spenborough by-election
- Brighouse and Spenborough
- Lists of United Kingdom by-elections
