= John Edwards (Labour politician) =

British university lecturer, trade union leader and Labour politician (1904–1959)

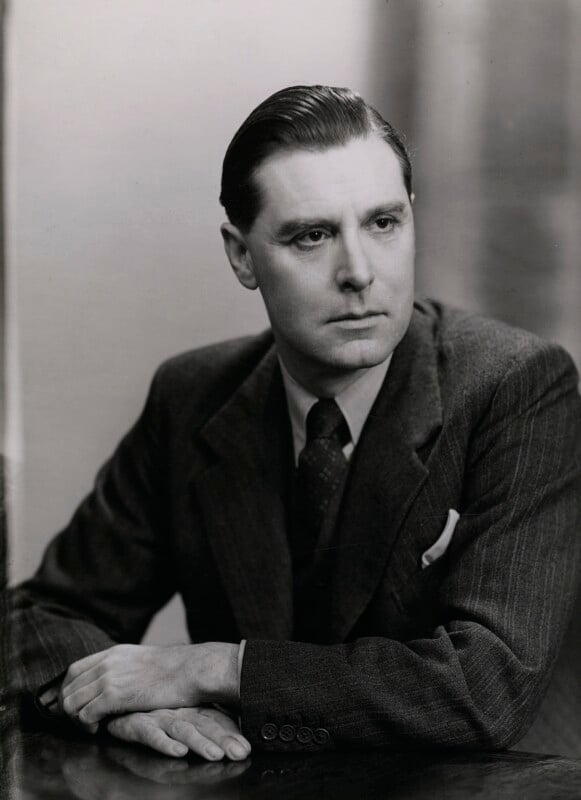
Edwards in 1949

Lewis John Edwards OBE (27 May 1904 – 23 November 1959) was a British university lecturer, trade union leader and Labour Party politician who sat in the House of Commons of the United Kingdom and was President of the Parliamentary Assembly of the Council of Europe.

== Life and career ==
Edwards was born in Aylesbury, the son of a railwayman, and educated at the Aylesbury Grammar School. After working for a bank, he studied for the priesthood at the College of the Resurrection, Mirfield, but decided his vocation lay outside the church. He then completed a degree in Economics at Leeds University.

He became a staff tutor at the University of Leeds and lectured in economics for the Workers Educational Association. He was elected to Leeds City Council, and after working in a university appointment in Birmingham, he became secretary for adult education at Liverpool University.

While at Liverpool, he was elected general secretary of the Post Office Engineering Union. He was elected as Member of Parliament for Blackburn in the United Kingdom general election of 1945. He became Parliamentary Private Secretary to Stafford Cripps at the Board of Trade, and then in 1947 he was made Parliamentary Secretary to the Ministry of Health. He carried through Parliament the National Assistance Act 1948, which abolished the remaining parts of the Poor Law, an achievement of which he was particularly proud.

In 1949 he returned to the Board of Trade as Parliamentary Secretary, supporting the President, Harold Wilson. In the election of 1950 he lost his Blackburn seat, but shortly after was elected in a by-election to the Yorkshire seat of Brighouse and Spenborough. In the reshuffle caused by the resignation of Sir Stafford Cripps as Chancellor of the Exchequer, he was appointed Economic Secretary to the Treasury, and held the post until the government lost the election of 1951.

In opposition he became Chairman of the Public Accounts Committee, and a member of the British parliamentary delegation to the Council of Europe from 1955, where he was elected in 1957 as vice-president and in April 1959 as President of the Consultative Assembly.

== Personal life ==
He married Dorothy May Watson in 1931 and had two daughters: Valerie Hope Edwards, who married Baron Roper, the Labour MP John Roper; and Margaret Elaine Edwards, who married Sir Christopher Jenkins, First Parliamentary Counsel 1994–1997.

Edwards sat for photographic portraits by Walter Stoneman; the negatives are held by the National Portrait Gallery, London.

== Death ==
In November 1959, in Strasbourg on Council of Europe business, he died suddenly of heart disease, aged 55. Then Labour leader, Hugh Gaitskell, was quoted as saying that "his notable administrative gifts would have ensured him an important post in any future Labour government".

Parliament of the United Kingdom
Preceded by Sir George Elliston and Sir W. D. Smiles	Member of Parliament for Blackburn; 1945–1950; With: Barbara Castle	Constituency abolished (split into east and west divisions)
Preceded by Frederick Cobb	Member of Parliament for Brighouse and Spenborough; 1950–1959	Succeeded by Michael Shaw
Trade union offices
Preceded by Charles Howard Smith	General Secretary of the Post Office Engineering Union; 1938–1947	Succeeded by Douglas Coward
Political offices
Preceded by Fernand Dehousse	President of the Parliamentary Assembly of the Council of Europe; 1959	Succeeded by Per Federspiel
