= 1952 Cleveland by-election =

UK Parliamentary by-election

The 1952 Cleveland by-election was held on 23 October 1952. It was held due to the death of the incumbent Labour MP, George Willey. It was retained by the Labour candidate, Arthur Palmer.

Cleveland by-election, 1952
Party	Candidate	Votes	%	±%
Labour	Arthur Palmer	25,985	54.09	−0.72
Conservative	Patrick Wall	22,064	45.92	+0.72
Majority		3,921	8.17	−1.45
Turnout		48,049		
Labour hold		Swing		
