= 1915 Cleveland by-election =

UK Parliamentary by-election

The 1915 Cleveland by-election was held on 9 December 1915. The by-election was held due to the incumbent Liberal MP, Herbert Samuel, becoming Chancellor of the Duchy of Lancaster. It was retained by Samuel.

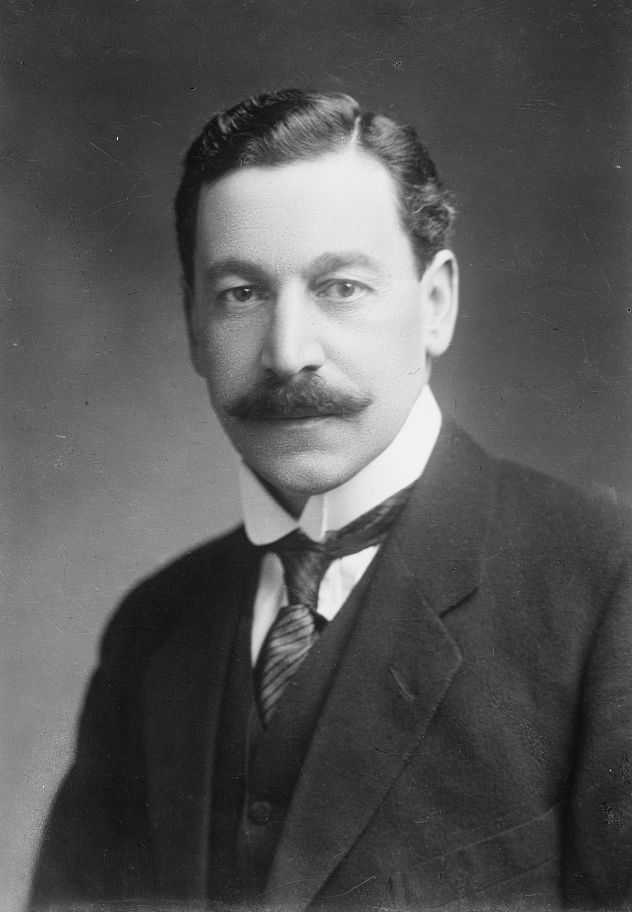
Herbert Samuel

Cleveland by-election, 1915
Party	Candidate	Votes	%	±%
Liberal	Herbert Samuel	7,312	83.4	+27.1
Independent	R Knight	1,453	16.6	New
Majority		5,859	66.8	+54.2
Turnout		8,765	53.4	−29.1
Liberal hold		Swing		
