= 1902 Cleveland by-election =

UK parliamentary by-election

- 5 November 1902

Candidate	Samuel	Drage
Party	Liberal	Conservative
Popular vote	5,834	3,798
Percentage	60.6%	39.4%
MP before election
Alfred Pease
Liberal
Subsequent MP
Herbert Samuel
Liberal

The 1902 Cleveland by-election was a parliamentary by-election held for the British House of Commons constituency of Cleveland in the North Riding of Yorkshire on 5 November 1902.

== Vacancy ==
The by-election was caused by the resignation on the grounds of ill-health of the sitting Liberal MP, Alfred Pease. Pease had held the seat since winning it at a by-election in 1897. He had previously served as MP for York from 1885 until 1892. Pease had apparently indicated that he was in declining health before the general election of 1900 but was pressed by his local Liberal Association to contest that election. He did so on condition that if his condition made it impossible for him to sit for the whole Parliament he would be allowed to resign and he now felt he had to step down. Despite this plea of poor health, Pease actually lived for another 37 years and spent much of the rest of his life in British East Africa hunting game and entertaining travellers who came for the safaris.

== Electoral history ==
The seat had been Liberal since creation in 1885. Pease held the seat at the last election, unopposed. At the previous election, he had won comfortably;

1897 Cleveland by-election
Party	Candidate	Votes	%	±%
Liberal	Alfred Pease	5,508	57.4	+4.1
Conservative	Robert Ropner	4,080	42.6	−4.1
Majority		1,428	14.8	+8.2
Turnout		9,588	83.7	+2.4
Liberal hold		Swing	+4.1	

== Candidates ==
=== Liberal Party ===
Philip Stanhope

The Liberals had a large number of potential candidates to choose from, including officials from the local Miners' Association. The miners had always supported the Liberal candidates in the Cleveland Division and the Liberals wished to ascertain the attitude of the Miners before selecting a candidate. The local Association resolved to wait for the outcome of a conference called by the miners on 11 October before deciding on their candidate. In the event, the miners were unable to make a decision in time. The delay meant that the Liberals had to press ahead with the selection of a candidate. At a meeting at Guisborough on 18 October 1902, two possible candidates were put forward, the Hon. Philip Stanhope who had been Liberal MP for Wednesbury and Burnley and Herbert Samuel. Stanhope was said by his proposer, Joseph Walton MP to be acceptable to Labour leaders, including Keir Hardie. Samuel, who had been left a fortune by his father, a partner in the banking firm of Samuel and Montagu, had taken more or less full-time interest in Liberal politics since before going to Balliol College, Oxford. He had tried unsuccessfully to enter the House of Commons twice before at South Oxfordshire. Samuel was supported at the meeting by the retiring Liberal MP, Alfred Pease and emerged the victor by a majority of about three-to-one.

=== Independent Labour Party ===
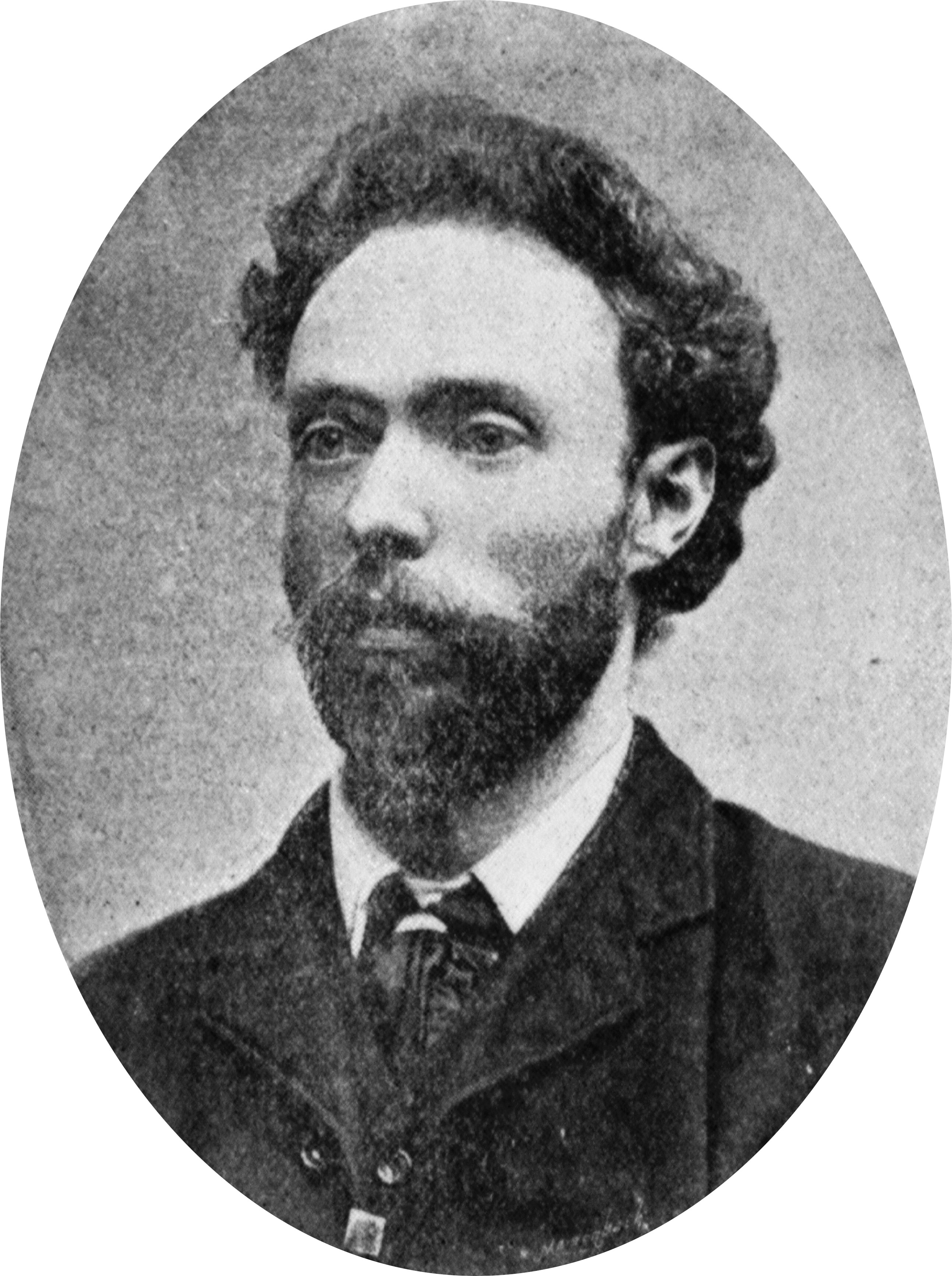
J. Bruce Glasier

It was reported that the ironstone miners in the Cleveland Division were minded to bring forward an Independent Labour Party candidate. A visit to the constituency by John Bruce Glasier, the chairman of the Independent Labour Party took place on 17 September 1902. Glasier said that if the miners wanted a labour candidate the ILP would assist but that if they decided to combine with the Liberals in support of a progressive representative, (as had traditionally been the case) the ILP would oppose that, raising the prospect of a split in the anti-Tory vote. The Cleveland Miners held a meeting at Middlesbrough on 29 September to discuss their approach. While they were not opposed in principle to supporting a Liberal if a candidate sympathetic to the cause of labour could be found, probably to stand as a Lib-Lab, the officials felt the time had come for labour to be more directly represented. On 23 September, ILP Leader Keir Hardie made a speech at Marske-by-the-Sea and urged the miners and other trade unionists to bring forward their own candidate. Rather hectoringly, he said that if they failed in their obvious duty, the ILP would stand a candidate. The miners resolved to stand their own man and called on the Labour Representation Committee to hold a conference on 11 October to discuss the matter. Despite Keir Hardie's presence, and the moving of a resolution welcoming the prospect of a labour candidate, reservations were expressed about the timing and cost of standing such a candidate and the conference outcome was inconclusive. There was a call for the Cleveland Miners to take their own vote and a meeting was to be held at Saltburn on 23 October. In the end however no labour candidate of any description was put forward at the by-election. The decision not to put forward a distinctively labour candidate and, in effect to maintain the traditional collaboration with the Liberals upset Keir Hardie and other ILP leaders. Philip Snowden of the Independent Labour Party is said to have dismissed Samuel as 'a plutocratic Jew.'

=== Conservative Party ===
The Unionists held a meeting on 22 October and chose Geoffrey Drage, formerly MP for Derby from 1895 to 1900. Drage had qualified as a barrister and was a member of Lincoln's Inn and the Middle Temple but never practised. Like Herbert Samuel, he seems to have dedicated himself full-time to political and public affairs.

== Issues ==
=== Education ===
Samuel raised the question of education in his election address. He called the Conservative government Education Bill reactionary and mischievous. He claimed it would make the system of education more complicated, weaken the control of the people over the Board Schools, deprive women of their right of election to the educational authorities and throw the whole of the cost of the Church and other denominational schools onto the rates and taxes while leaving the local control including the appointment of teachers in the hands of sectarian managers.

Drage also referred to the Education Bill in his address. He said that its passing was vital to every branch of industry in the country. He claimed it was designed to create a ladder up which the poorest child could climb to the top of the tree. It also provided systematically for technical education, without which British workers could not hope to compete with foreign rivals.

=== Social reform ===
Drage took up the language of social reform in his election address. He argued for legislation for the protection of infant life and for wage-earning and vagrant children. He claimed that labour and welfare reforms were more likely under a Unionist than a Liberal government. He wanted the law on all labour questions to be codified and administered by a separate department of state. This was daring given his opponent's well known advanced position on the need for social and welfare reforms. Samuel was a prominent member of the Rainbow Circle, a grouping of Liberals, Fabians and Socialists in favour of working together for the cause of political, industrial and social reform.

Samuel took his message on social reform to the mining and industrial districts. He supported the extension of the compensation a worker could recover from an employer in case of accident and the introduction a Bill which would limit the time a miner could be forced to work to eight hours a day. Samuel made it a priority to meet the miners and their leaders to try remove their disappointment at not having a candidate of their own and persuade them that the Liberal Party remained the party of progress and labour. At one point he announced he would stand as a 'Liberal and Labour' candidate but this backfired as he was attacked by Glasier of the ILP who denounced it a 'vulgar piece of electioneering which ought to be strongly resented by all respectable working men.' Samuel found it hard to gain endorsements from labour leaders in the country at large but local officials like Joseph Toyn worked hard to keep the Cleveland miners on the Liberal side. In the end even Glasier had to acknowledge that a Liberal MP, even one like Samuel of whom he disapproved, was better than another Tory. While he denounced Samuel's candidacy as 'discreditable' he nevertheless wanted him to win saying, “I don't want to see the working class vote Tory – there is no hope in such folly.” Glasier himself was obliged to vote Liberal in the High Peak by-election in 1909 to support the People's Budget and for traditional Radical causes such as Free Trade and anti-militarism.

== Result ==
The result was a win for Samuel; (The change in vote and swing relates to 1897)

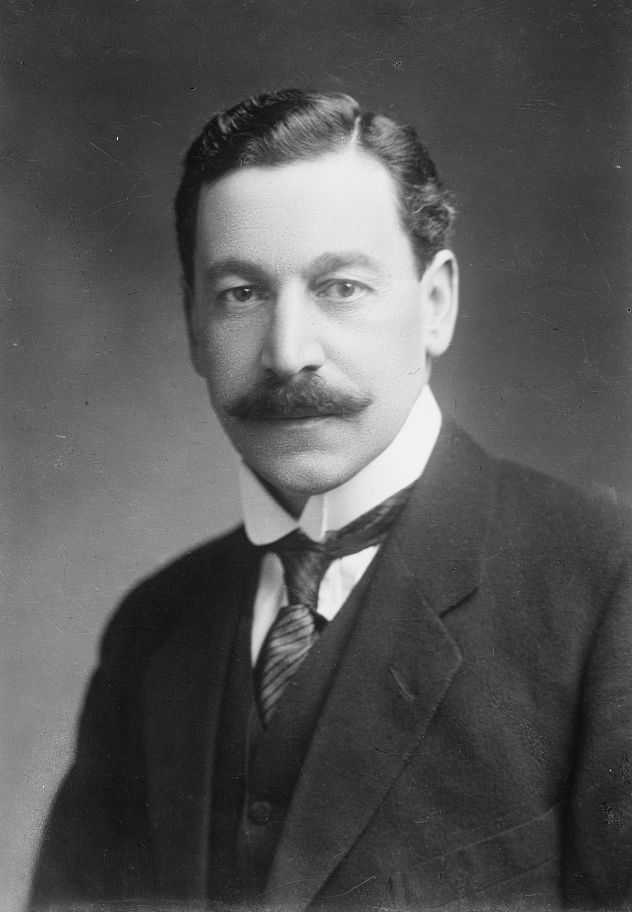
Herbert Samuel

1902 Cleveland by-election
Party	Candidate	Votes	%	±%
Liberal	Herbert Samuel	5,834	60.6	+3.2
Conservative	Geoffrey Drage	3,798	39.4	−3.2
Majority		2,036	21.2	+6.4
Turnout		9,632	77.9	−5.8
Liberal hold		Swing	+3.2	

It was reported that the result was a surprise to both the Liberals and Conservatives. The Unionists had high and realistic hopes of gaining the seat, albeit narrowly, based on their canvass returns. The Liberals were said to have expected to hold on but by a reduced majority and Samuel himself recorded that there was considerable local nervousness about the result given that the former member had been well-established and he was an outsider. In the event, the Liberals increased their vote and the Tory vote went down. The deciding factor was thought to be the Education Bill and the opposition from nonconformist voters to the idea of Church and Roman Catholic schools financed by the rates.

== Aftermath ==
The seat had become so safe now for the Liberals that in 1906, not only was there no socialist candidate, but there was no unionist candidate either and Samuel was returned unopposed.

== See also ==
- List of United Kingdom by-elections
- United Kingdom by-election records
