= Frederick Cobb =

British politician

Frederick Arthur Cobb (11 February 1901 – 27 March 1950) was a radio engineer and Labour Party politician in the United Kingdom.

He was the son of a farmer and joined the merchant navy as a radio operator while still a youth, during the First World War. He later became a maintenance engineer in the 2LO station which later became the BBC. In 1926 he became chief engineer of the Indian Broadcasting Company in Calcutta, where he remained for three years before becoming the general manager of a firm in High Wycombe producing radio and television equipment.

In the landslide election of 1945 he won the Elland constituency from the Conservatives. When this seat was abolished for the 1950 general election he transferred to the new constituency of Brighouse and Spenborough which covered much of the same area. He died just over a month later, aged 49, making the government's slender majority even more precarious until the party held the seat a by-election in May 1950.

Parliament of the United Kingdom
Preceded by Thomas Levy	Member of Parliament for Elland; 1945–1950	Constituency abolished
New constituency	Member of Parliament for Brighouse & Spenborough; 1950–1950	Succeeded by John Edwards
