= 1909 Cleveland by-election =

UK Parliamentary by-election

The 1909 Cleveland by-election was held on 9 July 1909. The by-election was held due to the incumbent Liberal MP, Herbert Samuel, being appointed Chancellor of the Duchy of Lancaster. It was retained by Samuel.

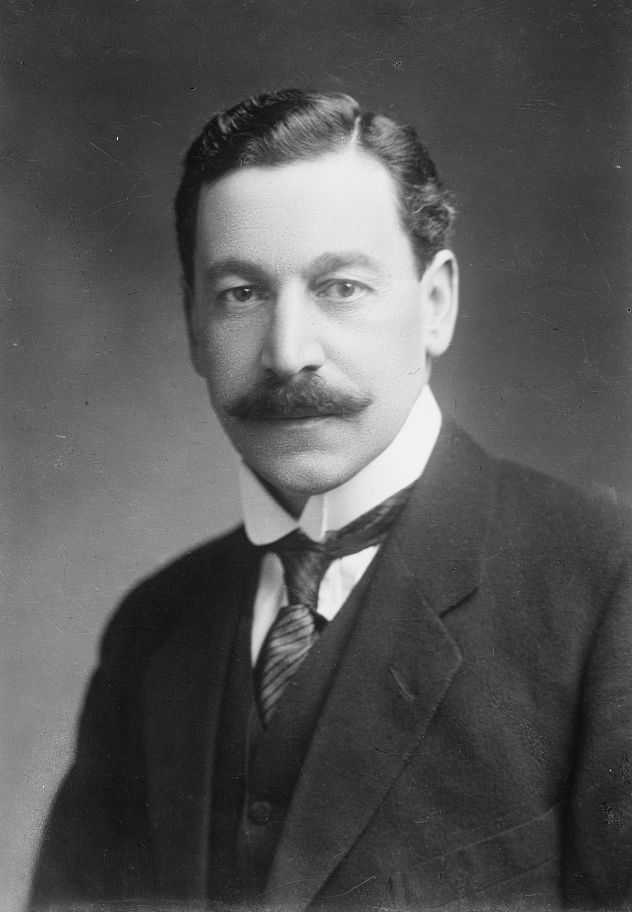
Herbert Samuel

Cleveland by-election, 1909
Party	Candidate	Votes	%	±%
Liberal	Herbert Samuel	6,296	54.2	N/A
Conservative	James Windsor Lewis	5,325	45.8	New
Majority		971	8.4	N/A
Turnout		11,621	83.5	N/A
Liberal hold		Swing	N/A	
