= James Tinn =

British politician

James Tinn (23 August 1922 – 18 November 1999) was a British Labour Party politician. Tinn was educated at Ruskin College and Jesus College, Oxford and became a teacher. He was a branch secretary of the National Union of Blastfurnacemen and a committee member of the North Cleveland association of the National Union of Teachers.

At the 1964 general election, he was returned to the House of Commons as Member of Parliament for Cleveland, and held the seat until its abolition for the February 1974 election. He was then elected in the new Redcar constituency, holding the seat until his retirement at the 1987 election. During this time Arthur Taylor, a local Labour Party councillor and later leader of Langbaurgh Borough Council, acted as Tinn's agent in three successful General Elections.

Tinn never attained ministerial office, but was a parliamentary private secretary from 1965.

Parliament of the United Kingdom
Preceded by Wilfred Proudfoot	Member of Parliament for Cleveland; 1964–Feb 1974	Succeeded by Leon Brittan (for Cleveland and Whitby)
New constituency	Member of Parliament for Redcar; Feb 1974–1987	Succeeded by Mo Mowlam
