= Harry Dack =

British trade unionist and politician

Harry Dack (1877–1954) was a British trade unionist and politician.

Born in Loftus-by-Cleveland, Dack received a basic education at Skinningrove Council School but, while still a child, began working in the local ironstone mines.

In 1902, Dack was elected as a checkweighman, and the following year, he was elected to the executive committee of the Cleveland Miners' and Quarrymen's Association. In 1911, he became the president and full-time agent of the union. He represented the union on various bodies, including serving on the executive of the Miners' Federation of Great Britain, attending the Trades Union Congress and Labour Party conferences, and three international conferences of miners: in Brussels in 1910, Carlsbad in 1913, and Prague in 1925.

At the 1918 United Kingdom general election, Dack stood as the Labour Party candidate for Cleveland, taking a close second place, with 35.3% of the vote. He stood again in 1922, but dropped back to third, with 29.5% of the votes cast. He continued political activity at a more local level, serving on both North Riding County Council and the Guisborough Board of Guardians from 1924. From 1930, he instead served on the county council as an alderman, and during the 1930s chaired the council's Agricultural Wages Committee and Public Assistance Committee.

The miners' association became part of the National Union of General and Municipal Workers in 1932, but retained significant autonomy even after the merger, with Dack continuing as a full-time agent until his retirement in 1936.

In 1934, Dack was made an Officer of the Order of the British Empire, while in the early 1950s, the Harry Dack Infants School in Loftus was named after him.

Trade union offices
Preceded by Joseph Toyn	President of the Cleveland Miners' and Quarrymen's Association; 1911–1932	Succeeded by Position abolished
