= Ann Cryer =

British politician (born 1939)

Ann Cryer JP

Member of Parliament for Keighley
- In office 1 May 1997 – 12 April 2010
- Preceded by: Gary Waller
- Succeeded by: Kris Hopkins

Personal details
- Born: Constance Ann Place; 14 December 1939 (age 86) Lytham St Annes, Lancashire, England
- Party: Labour
- Spouse(s): Bob Cryer (m. 1963; died 1994) John Hammersley (m. 2003; died 2004)
- Children: 4 (inc. John Cryer; two stepchildren)
- Education: Bolton Institute of Technology

Constance Ann Cryer JP (née Place; born 14 December 1939) is a British former politician who was the Labour Party Member of Parliament (MP) for Keighley from the 1997 general election up until she stood down at the 2010 general election.

== Early life ==
Born Constance Ann Place in Lytham St Annes, Lancashire, she comes from a political family. Her father, Allen Place, was an activist in the Independent Labour Party, as was his mother, Dinah Place, a suffragette. Ann Cryer was educated at St John's Primary School in Darwen and Spring Bank Secondary Modern School in the same town, before attending the Bolton Institute of Technology.

She began her career as a clerk for Imperial Chemical Industries in 1955, moving to the General Post Office as a telephonist 1960 to 1964.

== Politics ==
Cryer joined the Campaign for Nuclear Disarmament when she was 18 and in 1961 became the youngest serving councillor in the country.

She was selected as the prospective Labour candidate for the Keighley constituency, the seat her husband had held, from an all-women shortlist. She was elected to the House of Commons at the 1997 general election, defeating the sitting Conservative MP Gary Waller by 7,132 votes. She made her maiden speech on 16 May 1997.

When she entered parliament in 1997 she was joined by her son John who had been elected for Hornchurch; they were the only mother and son partnership in the Commons at that time, although John Cryer was out of parliament during the 2005–10 parliament.

Cryer was re-elected in the 2001 and 2005 general elections. After the 2005 general election, she was a member of the Home Affairs Select committee. She voted against the government on many occasions and was a member of the left-wing Socialist Campaign Group during her time in parliament. Cryer voted with the government to increase detention without trial to 42 days for terror suspects. She favours nuclear disarmament.

Cryer attracted media attention, and death threats, for speaking out against forced marriages, honour killings, calling on immigrants to learn to speak English before entering the country, and for being amongst the first people to address the issue of gangs of Asian men sexually abusing children in Yorkshire.

On 21 August 2008, Cryer announced she would not contest the next general election, due to her health, energy levels and age.

In May 2012, Cryer unsuccessfully stood as a candidate for the Ilkley ward of City of Bradford Metropolitan District Council.

She was interviewed in 2014 as part of The History of Parliament's oral history project.

== Personal life ==
Ann Place married Bob Cryer in 1963. She became a researcher in social history at the University of Essex in 1969 before becoming a full-time personal assistant to her husband when he entered parliament in 1974 until his death in a car accident on 12 April 1994. She was in the car with him at the time.

Cryer has a son and a daughter, and two stepchildren from her second marriage in 2003 to the Rev John Hammersley, who died a year later.

Ann Cryer is president of the Keighley and Worth Valley Railway Society, having been a member with her first husband from its early days. She became a Justice of the Peace in 1996 and a member of the Bradford Cathedral Council from 1999.

== Awards ==
In December 2009, Ann Cryer was awarded an honorary doctorate by the University of Bradford for services to the community from 1991, before and after becoming Keighley's MP.

== Works ==
- Boldness be My Friend: Remembering Bob Cryer by Ann Cryer and John Cryer, 1997, Bradford Arts, Museums and Libraries Service, ISBN 0-907734-48-0

Parliament of the United Kingdom
Preceded by Gary Waller	Member of Parliament for Keighley; 1997–2010	Succeeded by Kris Hopkins
