= Joseph Toyn =

Joseph Toyn (28 September 1838 – 27 January 1924) was a British trade unionist.

Born in Tattershall in Lincolnshire, Toyn worked as a bird-scarer on a farm from the age of six. After a variety of other farm work, when he was fourteen, he began working on a canal barge, then three years later became an ironstone miner in Cleveland. After some time, he was promoted to become an overman, but soon resigned to work underground again.

In 1872, Toyn was a founder of the Cleveland Miners' Association, serving as a delegate from his mine, then in 1875 he became the union's president. The following year, the union appointed him as its full-time agent. As agent, he was the leading figure in setting up a conciliation board to resolve disputes in the industry, which he credited with preventing any strikes during his time in office.

Through his work for the union, Toyn regularly attended the Trades Union Congress, and also served on the board of the Miners' National Union (MNU). However, in 1892, he persuaded the union to leave the MNU and instead affiliated to the rival Miners' Federation of Great Britain (MFGB). This federation was campaigning for an eight-hour maximum working day, an issue which Toyn strongly supported.

Toyn was elected to the executive of the MFGB in 1896, but served only a single year. He also became active in the Labour Electoral Association, which proposed him as a Liberal-Labour candidate in the Cleveland by-election, 1902. However, by this time, the Cleveland Miners were affiliated to the Labour Representation Committee, forerunner of the Labour Party, and were hoping to sponsor a rival candidate. Ultimately, Toyn decided not to run.

Toyn was appointed as a magistrate in 1906, and was also prominent in the local co-operative movement and as a Primitive Methodist lay preacher. He retired from his trade union posts in 1911.

Trade union offices
Preceded by ?	President of the Cleveland Miners' and Quarrymen's Association; 1875–1911	Succeeded by Harry Dack
