= Gary Waller =

British politician

Member of Parliament for Keighley
- In office 9 June 1983 – 8 April 1997
- Preceded by: Bob Cryer
- Succeeded by: Ann Cryer

Member of Parliament for Brighouse and Spenborough
- In office 3 May 1979 – 13 May 1983
- Preceded by: George Jackson
- Succeeded by: Constituency abolished

Personal details
- Born: Gary Peter Anthony Waller; 24 June 1945 Bradford, West Yorkshire, England
- Died: 21 July 2017 (aged 72)
- Party: Conservative
- Education: Lancaster University
- Occupation: Politician

Gary Peter Anthony Waller (24 June 1945 – 21 July 2017) was a British Conservative politician.

== Schooling ==
Waller was educated at Rugby School, where he excelled at cross country running, and graduated from Lancaster University in 1967.

== Political career ==
=== Election ===
Waller was the Conservative candidate for the Labour safe seat of Rother Valley in the February and October 1974 elections, but Peter Hardy retained the seat on both occasions. Waller was originally elected as the MP for Brighouse and Spenborough, taking the seat from Labour, at the 1979 general election, until 1983, when boundary changes meant the constituency was abolished. Instead, he was elected for nearby Keighley, defeating the Labour incumbent Bob Cryer.

During his time in Parliament, Waller served as Vice Chairman of the Parliamentary Information Technology Committee. From 1992 to 1997, he served as Chairman of the House of Commons Information Committee, which oversaw the work of the House of Commons Library and parliamentary IT.

At the 1997 general election, he lost his Keighley seat to Labour's Ann Cryer, widow of Bob Cryer.

=== 1994 revelation ===
In January 1994, The People newspaper published claims Waller was the father of an illegitimate son. The newspaper claimed he was the biological father of the son of Fay Stockwell, who was Sir Marcus Fox's secretary. Waller later admitted the claims were true.

=== Local Government ===
Waller was elected a District Councillor on 5 May 2011 to represent the Lower Sheering Ward on Epping Forest District Council. He was the cabinet member for the Safer, Greener and Transport portfolio and a member of many committees and panels, including the Essex Police and Crime Panel. He was President of Harlow Conservative Association, and lived near his ward. He also served on Hatfield Broad Oak parish council.

== Sources ==
- "Times Guide to the House of Commons", Times Newspapers Limited, 1983 and 1997 editions.

Parliament of the United Kingdom
Preceded by Colin Jackson	Member of Parliament for Brighouse & Spenborough; 1979–1983	constituency abolished
Preceded by Bob Cryer	Member of Parliament for Keighley; 1983–1997	Succeeded by Ann Cryer
