= Cleveland Miners' and Quarrymen's Association =

Former trade union of the United Kingdom

- Merged into: National Union of General and Municipal Workers
- Founded: 13 January 1872
- Dissolved: 1932
- Headquarters: 17 Ruby Street, Saltburn-by-the-Sea
- Location: England
- Members: 10,000 (1910)
- Parent organization: Miners' National Union (until 1892); Miners' Federation of Great Britain (from 1892)

The Cleveland Miners' and Quarrymen's Association was a trade union representing ironstone miners in the Cleveland area of England.

The union was founded in 1872 as the North Yorkshire and Cleveland Miners and Quarrymen's Association by Joseph Shepherd. It grew rapidly, with thirty-three lodges existing one year later, and also proved industrially successful, claiming to have increased miners' wages by 45%, and to have established a standard eight-hour working day. However, Shepherd fell out with his colleagues due to persistent drunkenness and was removed from his position in 1876 after leaving court documents on a train.

From the start, the union campaigned to reduce miners' hours of work and increase their pay, and also to help educate miners, and provide healthcare in case of injury or sickness. Long affiliated with the Miners' National Union, in 1892 it transferred to the Miners Federation of Great Britain, becoming its only affiliate not to principally represent coal miners.

By 1900, the union had a membership of 7,550, and around this time it shortened its name to the "Cleveland Miners and Quarrymen's Association". Membership rose further, peaking at just under 10,000 in 1910. In 1932, the union merged into the National Union of General and Municipal Workers.

== General secretaries ==
1872: Joseph Shepherd
1876: Thomas Dunn
1880s: Robert Rowland
1889: George Bernal Hobbs
1909:
1920: William Thomas Mansfield

== Presidents ==
1875: Joseph Toyn
1911: Harry Dack

== See also ==
- Ironstone mining in Cleveland and North Yorkshire
