= Cleveland (UK Parliament constituency) =

Parliamentary constituency in the United Kingdom, 1885–1974

- Former county constituency for the House of Commons
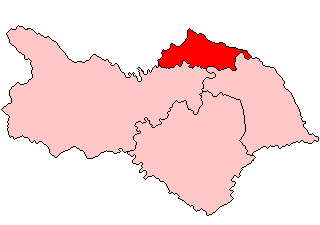
- Cleveland 1918–1950

1885–February 1974
- Seats: 1
- Created from: North Riding of Yorkshire
- Replaced by: Cleveland and Whitby and Redcar

Cleveland was a county constituency in the Langbaurgh Wapentake (also known as Cleveland), North Riding of Yorkshire, England.

== Electorate ==
It returned one Member of Parliament (MP) to the British House of Commons, using the first past the post voting system. All elections were conducted with a secret ballot, which had been introduced under the Ballot Act 1872.

The franchise was initially restricted, and extended on several occasions:

- The Representation of the People Act 1884 gave a vote to adult males who met a property qualification; women, and about 40% of men, had no vote
- The Representation of the People Act 1918 extended the vote to all adult males and to women over the age of 30 who met certain property qualifications
- The Representation of the People Act 1928 allowed women to vote from age 21, on the same terms as men
- The Representation of the People Act 1948 abolished the plural votes previously granted to electors who met a property qualification because of their business or shop premises
- The Representation of the People Act 1969 lowered the voting age to 18

== History ==
The Cleveland constituency was created when the North Riding of Yorkshire constituency was divided by the Redistribution of Seats Act 1885, and Cleveland then covered the northern tip of the North Riding.

In 1918 it was redefined in terms of local government areas, and covered part of Guisborough Rural District and the Middlesbrough Rural District, along with the urban districts of Eston, Guisborough, Hinderwell, Loftus, Redcar, Saltburn by the Sea and Skelton and Brotton. In 1948 it was redefined again to cover Eston, Guisborough, Loftus, Redcar, Saltburn and Marske by the Sea and Skelton and Brotton; the new boundaries were first used for the 1950 general election. As such it was a socially mixed constituency throughout its existence, containing working class Middlesbrough suburbs and ironstone mining villages as well as middle class resorts and agricultural communities.

It returned its last Member of Parliament in 1970, by which time Cleveland district of Yorkshire's North Riding had been abolished in 1967, to the House of Commons of the Parliament of the United Kingdom until it was abolished leading up to the February 1974 general election.

It was replaced by the Redcar constituency and Cleveland & Whitby constituency.

== Members of Parliament ==
Election	Member	Party
1885	constituency created	
1885	Henry Fell Pease	Liberal
1897 by-election	Alfred Pease	Liberal
1902 by-election	Herbert Samuel	Liberal
1918	Sir Park Goff	Coalition Conservative
1923	Sir Charles Starmer	Liberal
1924	Sir Park Goff	Unionist
1929	William Mansfield	Labour
1931	Robert Tatton Bower	Conservative
1945	George Willey	Labour
1952 by-election	Arthur Palmer	Labour
1959	Wilfred Proudfoot	Conservative
1964	James Tinn	Labour
Feb 1974	constituency abolished: see Cleveland & Whitby	

== Elections ==
=== Elections in the 1880s ===
Henry Pease

General election 1885: Cleveland
Party	Candidate	Votes	%	±%
Liberal	Henry Fell Pease	6,948	70.9	
Conservative	Guy Dawnay	2,845	29.1	
Majority		4,103	41.8	
Turnout		9,793	83.1	
Registered electors		11,788		
Liberal win (new seat)				

General election 1886: Cleveland
Party	Candidate	Votes	%	±%
Liberal	Henry Fell Pease	Unopposed		
Liberal hold				

=== Elections in the 1890s ===
General election 1892: Cleveland
Party	Candidate	Votes	%	±%
Liberal	Henry Fell Pease	4,397	52.1	N/A
Conservative	Arthur Dorman	4,049	47.9	New
Majority		348	4.2	N/A
Turnout		8,446	76.3	N/A
Registered electors		11,076		
Liberal hold		Swing	N/A	

General election 1895: Cleveland
Party	Candidate	Votes	%	±%
Liberal	Henry Fell Pease	4,762	53.3	+1.2
Conservative	Robert Ropner	4,175	46.7	−1.2
Majority		587	6.6	+2.4
Turnout		8,937	81.3	+5.0
Registered electors		10,989		
Liberal hold		Swing	+1.2	

Pease's death causes a by-election.

1897 Cleveland by-election
Party	Candidate	Votes	%	±%
Liberal	Alfred Pease	5,508	57.4	+4.1
Conservative	Robert Ropner	4,080	42.6	−4.1
Majority		1,428	14.8	+8.2
Turnout		9,588	83.7	+2.4
Registered electors		11,454		
Liberal hold		Swing	+4.1	

=== Elections in the 1900s ===
General election 1900: Cleveland
Party	Candidate	Votes	%	±%
Liberal	Alfred Pease	Unopposed		
Liberal hold				

Geoffrey Drage

1902 Cleveland by-election
Party	Candidate	Votes	%	±%
Liberal	Herbert Samuel	5,834	60.6	N/A
Conservative	Geoffrey Drage	3,798	39.4	New
Majority		2,036	21.2	N/A
Turnout		9,632	77.9	N/A
Registered electors		12,360		
Liberal hold		Swing	N/A	

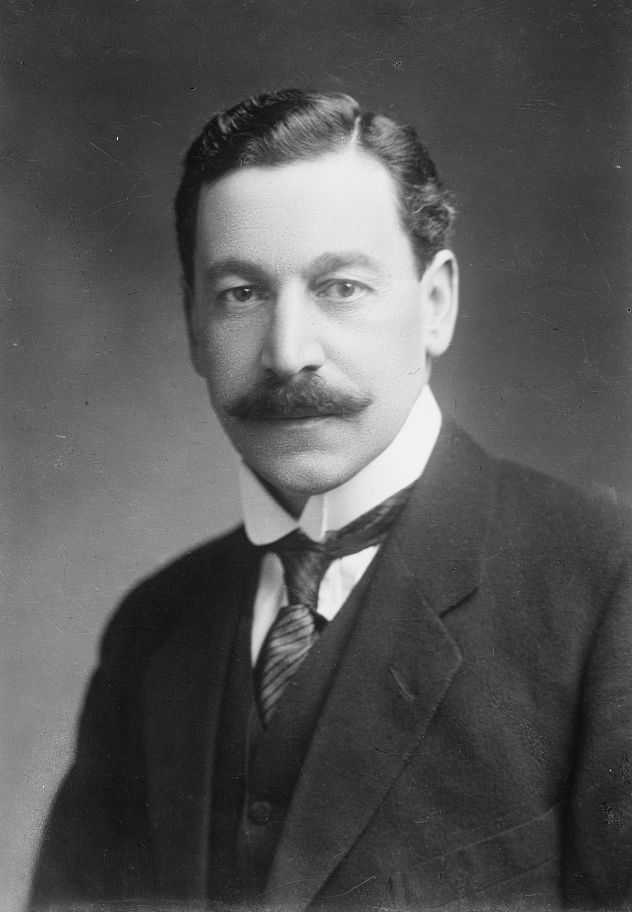
Herbert Samuel

General election 1906: Cleveland
Party	Candidate	Votes	%	±%
Liberal	Herbert Samuel	Unopposed		
Liberal hold				

1909 Cleveland by-election
Party	Candidate	Votes	%	±%
Liberal	Herbert Samuel	6,296	54.2	N/A
Conservative	James Windsor Lewis	5,325	45.8	New
Majority		971	8.4	N/A
Turnout		11,621	83.5	N/A
Registered electors		13,922		
Liberal hold		Swing	N/A	

=== Elections in the 1910s ===
General election January 1910: Cleveland
Party	Candidate	Votes	%	±%
Liberal	Herbert Samuel	7,484	57.7	N/A
Conservative	James Windsor Lewis	5,491	42.3	N/A
Majority		1,993	15.4	N/A
Turnout		12,975	87.6	N/A
Registered electors		14,811		
Liberal hold		Swing	N/A	

General election December 1910: Cleveland
Party	Candidate	Votes	%	±%
Liberal	Herbert Samuel	6,870	56.3	−1.4
Conservative	James Windsor Lewis	5,343	43.7	+1.4
Majority		1,527	12.6	−2.8
Turnout		12,213	82.5	−5.1
Registered electors		14,811		
Liberal hold		Swing	-1.4	

General Election 1914–15:

Another General Election was required to take place before the end of 1915. The political parties had been making preparations for an election to take place and by July 1914, the following candidates had been selected;

- Liberal: Herbert Samuel
- Unionist: Park Goff
- Labour: Harry Dack

1915 Cleveland by-election
Party	Candidate	Votes	%	±%
Liberal	Herbert Samuel	7,312	83.4	+27.1
John Bull League	R Knight	1,453	16.6	New
Majority		5,859	66.8	+54.2
Turnout		8,765	53.4	−29.1
Registered electors		16,424		
Liberal hold		Swing	N/A	

General election 1918: Cleveland
Party		Candidate	Votes	%	±%
C	Unionist	Park Goff	8,701	35.6	−8.1
	Labour	Harry Dack	8,610	35.3	New
	Liberal	Herbert Samuel	7,089	29.1	−27.2
Majority			91	0.3	N/A
Turnout			24,400	66.2	−16.3
Registered electors			36,843		
	Unionist gain from Liberal		Swing	+4.1	
C indicates candidate endorsed by the coalition government.

=== Elections in the 1920s ===
General election 1922: Cleveland
Party	Candidate	Votes	%	±%
Unionist	Park Goff	13,369	37.7	+2.1
Liberal	Charles Starmer	11,668	32.8	+3.7
Labour	Harry Dack	10,843	29.5	−5.8
Majority		1,701	4.9	+4.6
Turnout		35,880	83.2	+17.0
Registered electors		43,105		
Unionist hold		Swing	−0.8	

Starmer

General election 1923: Cleveland
Party	Candidate	Votes	%	±%
Liberal	Charles Starmer	13,326	38.2	+5.4
Unionist	Park Goff	11,855	34.0	−3.7
Labour	Robert Dennison	9,683	27.8	−1.7
Majority		1,471	4.2	N/A
Turnout		34,864	80.4	−2.0
Registered electors		43,339		
Liberal gain from Unionist		Swing	+4.6	

General election 1924: Cleveland
Party	Candidate	Votes	%	±%
Unionist	Park Goff	16,578	43.6	+9.6
Labour	William Mansfield	11,153	29.4	+1.6
Liberal	Charles Starmer	10,260	27.0	−11.2
Majority		5,425	14.2	N/A
Turnout		37,991	86.3	+5.9
Registered electors		44,040		
Unionist gain from Liberal		Swing	+10.4	

General election 1929: Cleveland
Party	Candidate	Votes	%	±%
Labour	William Mansfield	16,938	36.3	+6.9
Unionist	Park Goff	15,255	32.6	−11.0
Liberal	Charles Starmer	14,535	31.1	+4.1
Majority		1,683	3.7	N/A
Turnout		47,131	84.4	−1.9
Registered electors		55,463		
Labour gain from Unionist		Swing	+9.0	

=== Elections in the 1930s ===
General election 1931: Cleveland
Party	Candidate	Votes	%	±%
Conservative	Robert Tatton Bower	30,608	60.41	
Labour	William Mansfield	20,060	39.59	
Majority		10,548	20.82	N/A
Turnout		50,668	85.92	
Conservative gain from Labour		Swing		

General election 1935: Cleveland
Party	Candidate	Votes	%	±%
Conservative	Robert Tatton Bower	26,508	52.72	
Labour	William Mansfield	23,776	47.28	
Majority		2,732	5.44	
Turnout		50,284	81.15	
Conservative hold		Swing		

=== Elections in the 1940s ===
General Election 1939–40:

Another General Election was required to take place before the end of 1940. The political parties had been making preparations for an election to take place from 1939 and by the end of this year, the following candidates had been selected;

- Conservative: Robert Tatton Bower
- Labour: William Mansfield
- Liberal: Matthew Robinson Shawcross

General election 1945: Cleveland
Party	Candidate	Votes	%	±%
Labour	George Willey	27,660	48.95	
Conservative	Robert Tatton Bower	19,739	34.93	
Liberal	Matthew Robinson Shawcross	9,108	16.12	New
Majority		7,921	14.02	N/A
Turnout		56,507	76.05	
Labour gain from Conservative		Swing		

=== Elections in the 1950s ===
General election 1950: Cleveland
Party	Candidate	Votes	%	±%
Labour	George Willey	28,940	51.43	
Conservative	Edward Charles Peake	21,332	37.91	
Liberal	Arthur Laurence Braithwaite Childe	5,996	10.66	
Majority		7,608	13.52	
Turnout		56,268	85.79	
Labour hold		Swing		

General election 1951: Cleveland
Party	Candidate	Votes	%	±%
Labour	George Willey	31,237	54.81	
Conservative	Patrick Wall	25,756	45.19	
Majority		5,481	9.62	
Turnout		56,993	85.11	
Labour hold		Swing		

1952 Cleveland by-election
Party	Candidate	Votes	%	±%
Labour Co-op	Arthur Palmer	25,985	54.09	−0.72
Conservative	Patrick Wall	22,064	45.92	+0.72
Majority		3,921	8.16	−1.46
Turnout		48.049		
Labour Co-op hold		Swing		

General election 1955: Cleveland
Party	Candidate	Votes	%	±%
Labour Co-op	Arthur Palmer	27,649	50.15	
Conservative	Wilf Proudfoot	27,468	49.84	
Majority		181	0.32	
Turnout		55,117	80.81	
Labour Co-op hold		Swing		

General election 1959: Cleveland
Party	Candidate	Votes	%	±%
Conservative	Wilf Proudfoot	30,445	51.40	
Labour Co-op	Arthur Palmer	28,790	48.60	
Majority		1,655	2.80	N/A
Turnout		59,235	83.10	
Conservative gain from Labour Co-op		Swing		

=== Elections in the 1960s ===
General election 1964: Cleveland
Party	Candidate	Votes	%	±%
Labour	James Tinn	28,596	44.61	
Conservative	Wilf Proudfoot	24,124	37.63	
Liberal	John William Stevens	11,387	17.76	New
Majority		4,472	6.98	
Turnout		64,107	83.59	
Labour gain from Conservative		Swing		

General election 1966: Cleveland
Party	Candidate	Votes	%	±%
Labour	James Tinn	34,303	53.64	
Conservative	Wilf Proudfoot	22,423	35.06	
Liberal	Michael Ford Pitts	7,229	11.30	
Majority		11,880	18.58	
Turnout		63,955	81.13	
Labour hold		Swing		

=== Elections in the 1970s ===
General election 1970: Cleveland
Party	Candidate	Votes	%	±%
Labour	James Tinn	36,213	53.77	
Conservative	Peter Coles Price	31,130	46.23	
Majority		5,083	7.54	
Turnout		67,343	72.94	
Labour hold		Swing		
