= Robert Bower (Conservative politician) =

Royal Navy officer and politician (1894–1975)

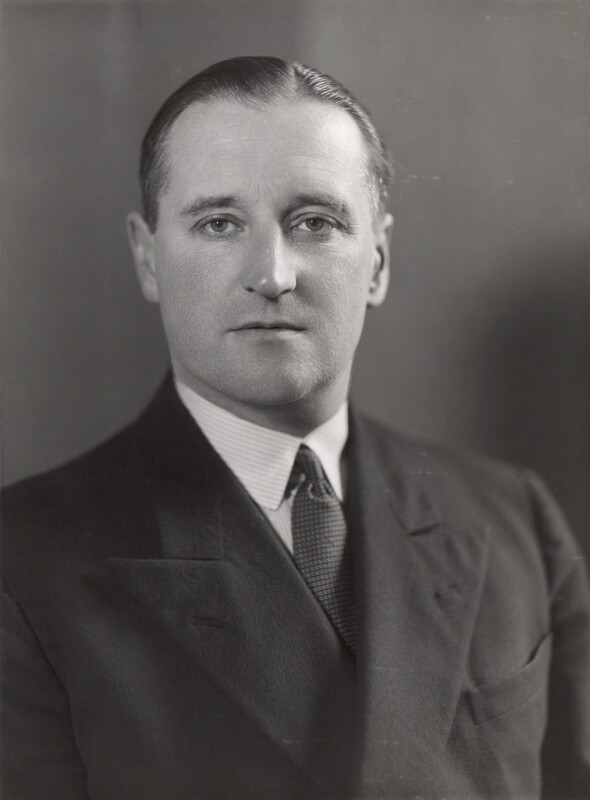
- Bower in 1936

Member of Parliament for Cleveland
- In office 27 October 1931 – 15 June 1945
- Preceded by: William Mansfield
- Succeeded by: George Willey

Personal details
- Born: 9 June 1894
- Died: 5 July 1975 (aged 81)
- Party: Conservative

Commander Robert Tatton Bower (9 June 1894 – 5 July 1975) was a Royal Navy officer and a Conservative politician.

== Early life ==
Bower was the only son- with two sisters- of Major Sir Robert Lister Bower, KBE, CMG, of The West House, Thirsk, Yorkshire, Chief Constable of the North Riding of Yorkshire, late of the 60th Rifles, and sometime of the 7th Battalion, King's Royal Rifle Corps, and Annette Norah, daughter of Henry Haswell Head, MD, of Thornhill, Bray, County Wicklow, Ireland. The Bower family were minor landed gentry, of Welham Hall, Malton, North Yorkshire.

== Political career ==
At the 1931 general election he was elected as Member of Parliament (MP) for Cleveland. He was re-elected in 1935, and held the seat until his defeat at the 1945 general election by the Labour Party candidate George Willey.

On 4 April 1938, Bower was involved in a House of Commons incident when he interrupted Jewish Labour MP Manny Shinwell, telling him to "go back to Poland". Shinwell walked across the floor of the House, and struck Bower a punch to the face, before turning to the speaker, apologising and walking out of the chamber to calls from MPs of "Get out! Get Out!" Bower, who on being struck had merely "folded his arms and stared" Shinwell down, did not make any counter attack, and then also apologised to the speaker. No disciplinary action was taken against either MP.

Although the open-handed blow from Shinwell was initially viewed as a "slap in the face", it struck Bower on the ear, resulting in internal bleeding between the layers of the left eardrum which was discovered four days later; a blood clot formed, causing the eardrum to burst. According to a report in Time magazine, Bower was described to be in "serious condition". He is reported to have said from his hospital bed: "This is an example of what may happen if the socialists get in."

The context of this violent confrontation was a series of questions being put by Labour MPs to the Foreign Office minister R.A. Butler, challenging the government's apparent recognition of the Duke of Alba as a diplomatic representative of General Franco's nationalist forces, who were then in the midst of a civil war against Spain's Republican government. Shinwell had described Butler's answers as "humbug" and "hypocrisy" and was being reprimanded by the Speaker for unparliamentary language at the moment Bower made his own intervention. The Speaker, Capt. Edward Fitzroy, took the view that: "Both were so thoroughly disorderly, that I propose to ignore them if the hon. Members will apologise."

Decades later, when reflecting on the altercation in a House of Commons speech, Shinwell remarked that he had not known Bower had been a boxing heavyweight champion in the Royal Navy, and if he had known he would not have gone near him.

== Personal life ==
On 24 September 1922, Bower married Hon. Henrietta May Caribbea (1903–1975), daughter of Gerald Strickland, 1st Baron Strickland, and Lady Edeline, daughter of Reginald Sackville, 7th Earl De La Warr and maternal granddaughter of the politician Alexander Baillie-Cochrane, 1st Baron Lamington.

The couple had four children together:

- Anne Cecilia Maud, Mrs Doyne-Ditmas (1923–2012)
- Robert Paul Bower (c. 1925–2011)
- Marianna Laetitia, Viscountess Monckton of Brenchley (1929–2022)
- Elizabeth Mary Lois de Mauny Wainwright (1933–2018)

Robert Tatton Bower also had a daughter, Monica Juanita Bower, later Mrs Fane de Salis.

Parliament of the United Kingdom
Preceded by William Mansfield	Member of Parliament for Cleveland; 1931 – 1945	Succeeded by George Willey
