= Leon Brittan =

British politician (1939–2015)

The Right Honourable The Lord Brittan of Spennithorne PC QC DL
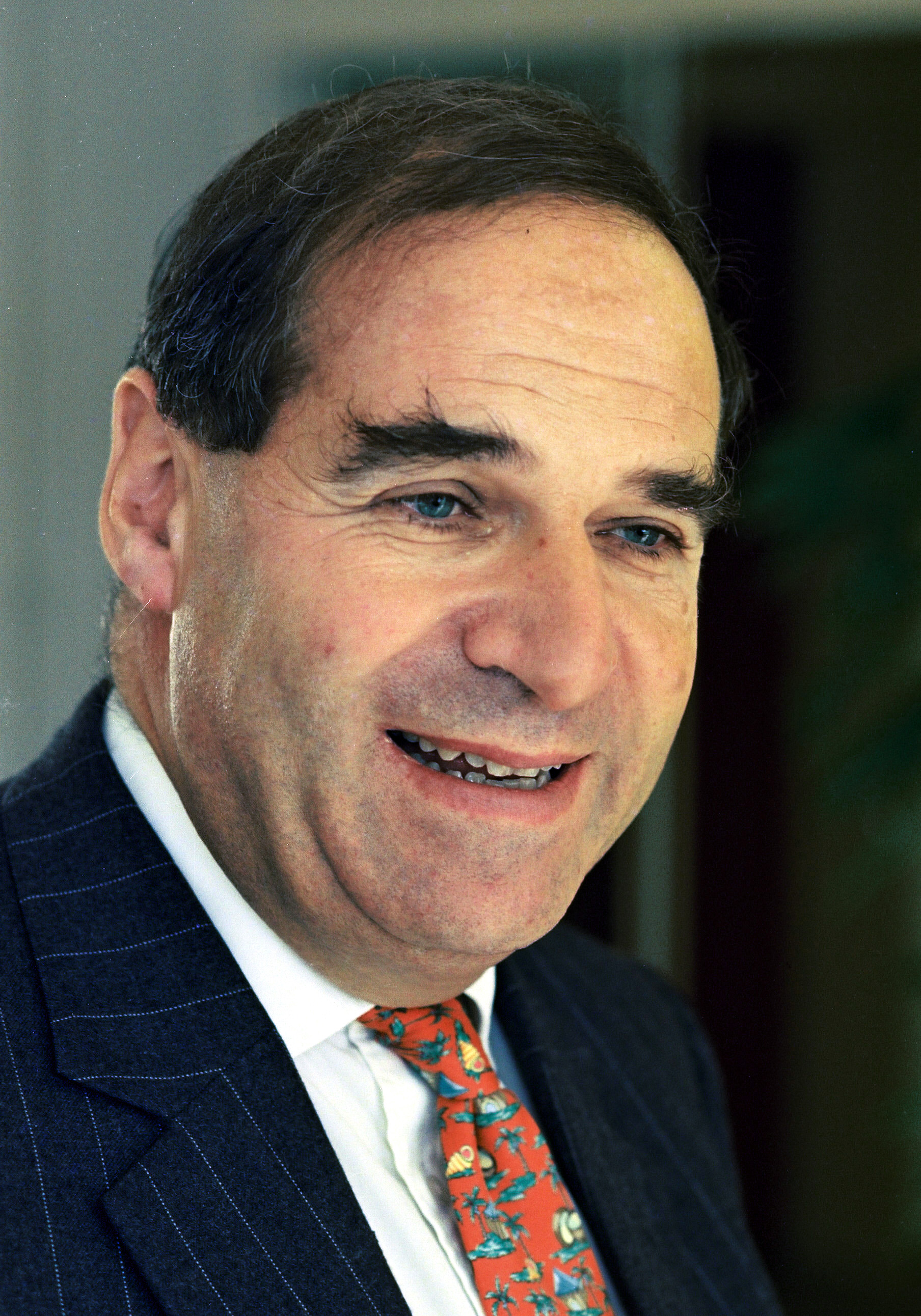
- Brittan in 1996

Vice-President of the European Commission
- In office 16 March 1999 – 15 September 1999
- President: Manuel Marín (acting)
- Preceded by: Manuel Marín
- Succeeded by: Neil Kinnock
European Commission 1989–1999
European Commissioner for External Relations
In office 23 January 1995 – 15 September 1999
President	Jacques Santer; Manuel Marín (acting)
Preceded by	Frans Andriessen
Succeeded by	Chris Patten
European Commissioner for Trade
In office 6 January 1993 – 15 September 1999
President	Jacques Delors; Jacques Santer; Manuel Marín (acting)
Preceded by	Frans Andriessen
Succeeded by	Pascal Lamy
European Commissioner for Competition
In office 6 January 1989 – 6 January 1993
President	Jacques Delors
Preceded by	Peter Sutherland
Succeeded by	Karel Van Miert

Secretary of State for Trade and Industry
- In office 2 September 1985 – 24 January 1986
- Prime Minister: Margaret Thatcher
- Preceded by: Norman Tebbit
- Succeeded by: Paul Channon

Home Secretary
- In office 11 June 1983 – 2 September 1985
- Prime Minister: Margaret Thatcher
- Preceded by: William Whitelaw
- Succeeded by: Douglas Hurd

Chief Secretary to the Treasury
- In office 5 January 1981 – 11 June 1983
- Prime Minister: Margaret Thatcher
- Chancellor: Geoffrey Howe
- Preceded by: John Biffen
- Succeeded by: Peter Rees

Minister of State for Home Affairs
- In office 4 May 1979 – 5 January 1981
- Prime Minister: Margaret Thatcher
- Preceded by: The Lord Boston of Faversham
- Succeeded by: Patrick Mayhew

Member of the House of Lords
- Lord Temporal
- Life peerage 9 February 2000 – 21 January 2015

Member of Parliament for Richmond (Yorks)
- In office 9 June 1983 – 31 December 1988
- Preceded by: Timothy Kitson
- Succeeded by: William Hague

Member of Parliament for Cleveland and Whitby
- In office 28 February 1974 – 13 May 1983
- Preceded by: James Tinn
- Succeeded by: Constituency abolished

Personal details
- Born: Leon Brittan; 25 September 1939 London, England
- Died: 21 January 2015 (aged 75) London, England
- Party: Conservative
- Spouse: Diana Peterson (m. 1980) (née Clemetson)
- Children: 2
- Relatives: Samuel Brittan (brother)
- Education: Haberdashers' Aske's Boys' School
- Alma mater: Trinity College, Cambridge; Yale University
- Profession: Barrister
- Awards: Knight Bachelor (1989)

Leon Brittan, Baron Brittan of Spennithorne, PC, QC, DL (25 September 1939 – 21 January 2015) was a British Conservative politician and barrister who served as a European Commissioner from 1989 to 1999. As a member of Parliament from 1974 to 1988, he served several ministerial roles in Margaret Thatcher's government, including Home Secretary from 1983 to 1985.

== Early life ==
Leon Brittan was born in London, the son of Rebecca (née Lipetz) and Joseph Brittan, a doctor. His parents were Lithuanian Jews who had migrated to Britain before the Second World War.

Brittan was educated at the Haberdashers' Aske's Boys' School and Trinity College, Cambridge, where he was President of the Cambridge Union Society and Chairman of the Cambridge University Conservative Association. Brittan then studied at Yale University on a Henry Fellowship. Sir Samuel Brittan, the economics journalist, was his brother. The former Conservative MP Malcolm Rifkind and the music producer Mark Ronson were cousins.

== Political career ==
=== MP and minister ===
After unsuccessfully contesting the constituency of Kensington North in 1966 and 1970, he was elected to Parliament in the general election of February 1974 for Cleveland and Whitby, and became an opposition spokesman in 1976. He was made a Queen's Counsel in 1978. Between 1979 and 1981, he was Minister of State at the Home Office. He was then promoted to become Chief Secretary to the Treasury, becoming the youngest member of the Cabinet. He warned cabinet colleagues that spending on social security, health and education would have to be cut "whether they like it or not".

At the 1983 election, Brittan was elected MP for Richmond. Following the election, he was promoted to Home Secretary, becoming the youngest since Churchill. During the 1984–85 miners' strike, Brittan was a strong critic of the leadership of the National Union of Mineworkers. He accused them of organising violence by flying pickets, whom he described as "thugs". One factor in the defeat of the strike was central control of local police forces. As soon as the strike began, Brittan set up a National Reporting Centre in New Scotland Yard to coordinate intelligence and the supply of police officers between forces as necessary. Margaret Thatcher's government had carefully planned for a miners' strike, and a Whitehall committee had been meeting in secret since 1981 to prepare for a protracted dispute.

In 1984, following the murder of Yvonne Fletcher, a police officer, during a protest outside the Libyan embassy in London, Brittan headed the government's crisis committee as both Thatcher and the Foreign Secretary, Sir Geoffrey Howe, were away at the time. In January 2014, secret government documents released by the National Archives disclosed that Libya twice warned British officials that the Libyan embassy protest would become violent – hours before WPC Fletcher was killed.

In September 1986, Brittan was cleared by a High Court Judge of acting unlawfully when, as Home Secretary, he gave MI5 permission to tap the telephone of a leader of the Campaign for Nuclear Disarmament.

In September 1985, Brittan was moved to Secretary of State for Trade and Industry. The reason for his demotion, according to Jonathan Aitken, was that the prime minister Margaret Thatcher felt that Brittan was "not getting the message across on television". In her memoirs, Thatcher wrote of Brittan: "Everybody complained about his manner on television, which seemed aloof and uncomfortable."

Brittan had been criticised as a poor communicator and for his role in the suppression of a BBC television programme in the Real Lives series on The Troubles in Northern Ireland, At the Edge of the Union. Brittan stated that transmission of the programme would be against the national interest and in August 1985 he wrote to the BBC chairman, Stuart Young, asking for the broadcast to be cancelled. The BBC's Board of Governors called an emergency meeting and ruled that the documentary could not be shown. The controversy led to a rift between the BBC's boards of management and governors. It also led to a day of strike action by hundreds of television and radio workers who protested against what they perceived as government censorship.

=== Resignation over the Westland affair ===
Brittan resigned as Trade and Industry Secretary in January 1986 over the Westland affair. Brittan had authorised the leaking of a letter from the Solicitor General that had accused Michael Heseltine of inaccuracies in his campaign for Westland to be rescued by a consortium of European investors. The rest of the government, led by Margaret Thatcher, supported a deal with the American business Sikorsky Fiat.

Jonathan Aitken wrote of Brittan's resignation: "Soon after a poisonous meeting of Tory backbenchers at the 1922 Committee, he fell on his sword. It was a combination of a witch hunt and a search for a scapegoat – tainted by an undercurrent of anti-Semitism. […] I believed what should have been obvious to anyone else, that he was being used as a lightning conductor to deflect the fire that the Prime Minister had started and inflamed". It was later revealed that Brittan had attempted to persuade British Aerospace and General Electric Company (GEC) to withdraw from the European consortium.

In October 1986, in a House of Commons debate, Brittan made a bitter attack on Michael Heseltine, accusing him of "thwarting the Government at every turn" in its handling of the Westland affair. Brittan said that Government decisions "should have the support of all its members and should not be undermined from within".

In 1989, Brittan revealed in a Channel 4 programme that two senior Downing Street officials, Bernard Ingham and Charles Powell, had approved the leaking of the letter from the Solicitor General. Brittan's claim led to calls from some Labour MPs for a new inquiry into the Westland affair.

=== European Commission ===
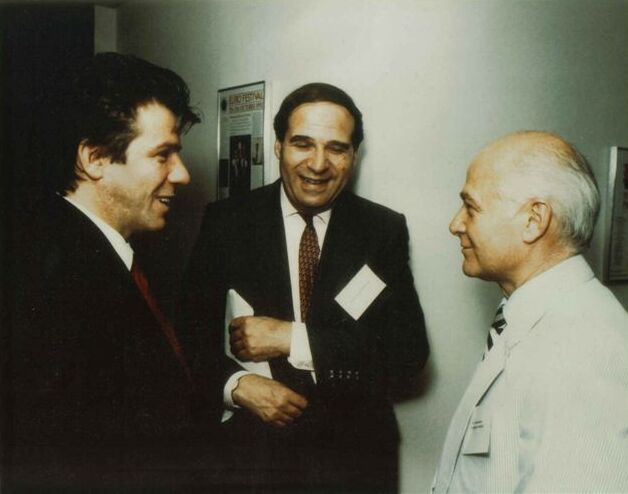
Sir Leon Brittan (centre) as a European Commissioner in 1994

Brittan was knighted in the 1989 New Years Honours List. He was made European Commissioner for Competition at the European Commission early in 1989, resigning as an MP to take the position. He accepted the post reluctantly, as it meant giving up his British parliamentary ambitions. Margaret Thatcher appointed Brittan to the Commission as a replacement for Lord Cockfield, whose pro-European enthusiasm she disapproved of; however, in doing so she had overlooked Brittan's own record as a supporter of the European Union and subsequently found his views and policies at odds with those she had expected from him. Brittan passed the merger regulation in 1989, which enabled him to ban the ATR/De Havilland planned merger in 1991.

In 1993 he became European Commissioner for Trade and in 1995 European Commissioner for External Affairs, also serving as a Vice-President of the European Commission. Brittan resigned with the rest of the Santer Commission in 1999 amid accusations of fraud against Jacques Santer and Édith Cresson. During his time as a Vice-President of the European Commission, one subsequently prominent member of his official office was Nick Clegg, who became leader of the Liberal Democrats in December 2007 and deputy prime minister in May 2010.

== Peerage ==
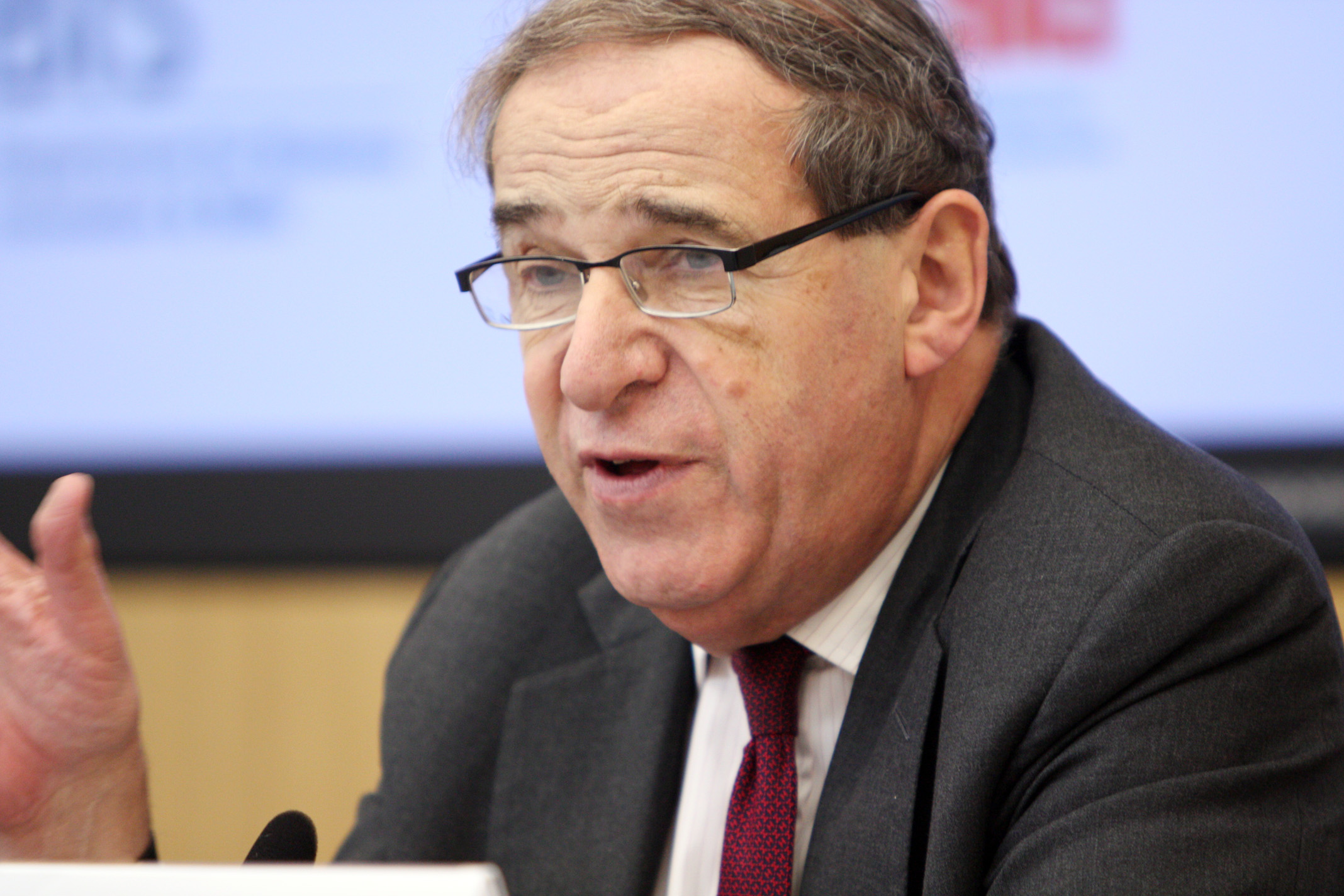
Lord Brittan as the Prime Minister's Representative for Trade in 2011

Brittan was created a life peer, as Baron Brittan of Spennithorne in North Yorkshire, on 9 February 2000. He was vice-chairman of UBS AG Investment Bank, non-executive director of Unilever and member of the international advisory committee for Total. In August 2010, Brittan was appointed a trade adviser to the UK government. Prime Minister David Cameron said that Brittan had "unrivalled experience" for the job, which was scheduled to last for six months.

Brittan's wife, Diana (née Clemetson, formerly Peterson; born 1940), Lady Brittan of Spennithorne, was named a Dame Commander of the Order of the British Empire (DBE) in the 2004 Birthday Honours "for public service and charity".

== Death ==
Brittan died at his London home in Pimlico on 21 January 2015, aged 75; he had been ill with cancer for some time. He had two stepdaughters.

== Allegations ==
=== Paedophile dossier ===
In 1984, in his capacity as Home Secretary, Brittan was handed a 40-page dossier by Geoffrey Dickens MP which detailed alleged paedophile activity in the 1980s, including, according to Dickens, allegations concerning "people in positions of power, influence and responsibility". The whereabouts of the dossier is currently unknown. Brittan denied any knowledge of the matter in an e-mail to a Channel 4 News reporter in 2013, and later replied that he had no recollection of it to a query from The Independent newspaper.

Brittan later declared in 2014 that Dickens had met him at the Home Office and that he had written to Dickens on 20 March 1984, explaining what had been done about the files. In an article for The Times, journalist James Gillespie quoted a letter from Dickens dated 7 January 1984 in which he thanked Brittan for his "splendid support". He also gave examples of the allegations in the dossier, including a woman protesting that her 16-year-old son had become homosexual after working in Buckingham Palace kitchens and a civil servant advocating persons caught by Customs and Excise importing child pornography should be referred to the police.

An initial review by Home Office civil servant Mark Sedwill in 2013 concluded that copies of Dickens's material had "not been retained" but that Brittan had acted appropriately in dealing with the allegations. In November 2014, a review by Peter Wanless followed. Wanless said there was no evidence to suggest that files had been removed to cover up abuse.

=== Allegations pursued by Labour MP ===
In June 2014, Brittan was interviewed under caution by police in connection with the alleged rape of a 19-year-old student in his central London flat in 1967 before he became an MP. They had not pursued the allegation when it was first made because of insufficient evidence. The police reopened the investigation after Alison Saunders, the Director of Public Prosecutions, had been lobbied by Labour MP Tom Watson to investigate further. In a statement on 7 July 2014, Brittan denied the claims. At the time of his death, Brittan had not been told by the police that there was insufficient evidence to prosecute him for the alleged rape of the woman. The deputy assistant commissioner of the Met, Steve Rodhouse, wrote a letter of apology to the solicitors of Brittan's widow.

In October 2014, the Labour MP Jimmy Hood used parliamentary privilege to refer to claims that Brittan had been linked to child abuse. After Brittan died in January 2015, Watson accused him of "multiple child rape"; he said he had spoken to two people who claimed they were abused by Brittan. Convicted fraudster Chris Fay alleged that he had seen a photograph of Brittan with a child at Elm Guest House in mid-1982. In March 2015, it was reported that detectives from Operation Midland, set up by the Metropolitan Police to investigate claims of child sex abuse, had visited and searched two homes in London and Yorkshire formerly owned by Brittan. One of Brittan's accusers subsequently told BBC's Panorama that he originally named Brittan as a joke and told the Metropolitan Police that two well-known campaigners may have led him into making false claims. On 21 March 2016, the Metropolitan Police confirmed that Operation Midland had been closed without any charges being brought.

On 1 September 2017, it was reported that the Metropolitan Police had paid substantial compensation to Brittan's widow for having raided the Brittans' home "after accepting that the searches had been unjustified and should never have taken place." Carl Beech, whose claims spurred Operation Midland, was convicted of perverting the course of justice in July 2019.

== Honours ==
Brittan was created a life peer by the Queen. He took the title Baron Brittan of Spennithorne, of Spennithorne in the County of North Yorkshire on 9 February 2000. He sat with the Conservative Party benches in the House of Lords.

=== Commonwealth honours ===
Country	Date	Appointment	Post-nominal letters
United Kingdom	1978 – 21 January 2015	Queen's Counsel	QC
United Kingdom	1981 – 21 January 2015	Member of Her Majesty's Most Honourable Privy Council	PC
United Kingdom	31 December 1988 – 21 January 2015	Knight Bachelor	Kt
United Kingdom	1 August 2001 – 25 September 2014	Deputy Lieutenant of North Yorkshire	DL

=== Foreign honours ===
Country	Date	Appointment	Post-nominal letters
Estonia		Order of the Cross of Terra Mariana (2nd Class)	

=== Scholastic ===
Chancellor, visitor, governor, rector and fellowships
Location	Date	School	Position
England	1993–2005	Teesside University	Chancellor

Honorary degrees
Location	Date	School	Degree	Gave Commencement Address
England	1990	Newcastle University	Doctor of Civil Law (DCL)	
England	1990	University of Hull	Doctor of Laws (LL.D)	
Scotland	1991	University of Edinburgh	Doctorate	
England	1992	University of Bradford	Doctor of Laws (LL.D)	
England	1992	University of Durham	Doctor of Civil Law (DCL)	
England	1995	University of Bath	Doctor of Laws (LL.D)	
England		Teesside University	Doctor of Laws (LL.D)	

=== Memberships and fellowships ===
Country	Date	Organisation	Position
United Kingdom	1960	Cambridge Union	President
United Kingdom	1983 – 21 January 2015	Inner Temple	Bencher

== Arms ==
Coat of arms of Leon Brittan
Crest A Wensleydale sheep guardant Argent unguled Or and supporting with the dexter forefoot a quiver Vert banded Or the arrows Gules. Escutcheon Or two bars engrailed Vert between three curlews' heads erased in pale Gules. Supporters Dexter a lion guardant Argent gorged with a plain collar attached thereto a chain reflexed over the back Or, sinister a bull guardant Argent unguled armed and gorged with a plain collar attached thereto a chain reflexed over the back Or. Motto Ne Umquam Desistas

Parliament of the United Kingdom
New constituency	Member of Parliament for Cleveland and Whitby; 1974–1983	Constituency abolished
Preceded by Sir Tim Kitson	Member of Parliament for Richmond (Yorks); 1983–1988	Succeeded by William Hague
Political offices
Preceded by John Biffen	Chief Secretary to the Treasury; 1981–1983	Succeeded by Peter Rees
Preceded by William Whitelaw	Home Secretary; 1983–1985	Succeeded by Douglas Hurd
Preceded by Norman Tebbit	Secretary of State for Trade and Industry; 1985–1986	Succeeded by Paul Channon
Preceded by The Lord Cockfield	European Commissioner from the United Kingdom; 1989–1999; Served alongside: Bruce Millan; Neil Kinnock	Succeeded by Chris Patten
Preceded by Stanley Clinton-Davis	European Commissioner from the United Kingdom; 1989–1999; Served alongside: Bruce Millan; Neil Kinnock	Succeeded by Neil Kinnock
Preceded by Peter Sutherland	European Commissioner for Competition; 1989–1993	Succeeded by Karel Van Miert
Preceded by Frans Andriessen	European Commissioner for Trade; 1994–1999	Succeeded by Pascal Lamy
Preceded by Frans Andriessen	European Commissioner for External Relations; 1995–1999	Succeeded by Chris Patten
Preceded by Manuel Marín	First Vice-President of the European Commission; 1999	Succeeded by Neil Kinnock
Academic offices
New office	Chancellor of the University of Teesside; 1993–2005	Succeeded by The Lord Sawyer
