= Park Goff =

British politician

Sir Park Goff, 1st Baronet, KC (12 February 1871 – 14 April 1939) was a barrister and Conservative Party politician in England.

Goff was knighted on 26 June 1918, and at the 1918 general election he was elected as member of parliament (MP) for Cleveland. He had stood as a Coalition Conservative, and like others holding the "coalition coupon", he defeated the sitting Liberal Party MP Herbert Samuel.

Goff was re-elected in 1922, but the constituency remained a 3-way marginal seat, with Liberal, Conservative and Labour Party candidates all polling over 27% of the votes throughout the 1920s, and he lost in 1923 to the Liberal candidate Sir Charles Walter Starmer. Goff regained the seat at the 1924 general election, but was defeated again at the 1929 election, this time by the Labour candidate William Thomas Mansfield.

Goff did not stand again in Cleveland, but at the 1931 election he was elected as MP for Chatham in Kent. He stood down from Parliament at the 1935 general election.

He was appointed as a King's Counsel in 1925, and made a baronet on 3 March 1936, 'of Goffs Oak, in the County of Hertford'. The title became extinct on his death in 1939, aged 68.

Parliament of the United Kingdom
Preceded by Herbert Samuel	Member of Parliament for Cleveland; 1918 – 1923	Succeeded by Sir Charles Starmer
Preceded by Sir Charles Starmer	Member of Parliament for Cleveland; 1924 – 1929	Succeeded by William Mansfield
Preceded by Frank Markham	Member of Parliament for Chatham; 1931 – 1935	Succeeded by Leonard Plugge
Baronetage of the United Kingdom
New creation	Baronet (of Goffs Oak, Herts); 1936–1939	Title extinct
Court offices
Preceded by Sir Harry North	Registrar of the Imperial Society of Knights Bachelor; 1908–1911	Succeeded by Sir Malcolm Fraser, 1st Baronet
