= Brighouse and Spenborough =

Parliamentary constituency in the United Kingdom, 1950–1983

- Former borough constituency for the House of Commons

1950–1983
- Seats: one
- Created from: Elland; Spen Valley
- Replaced by: Batley and Spen; Calder Valley

Brighouse and Spenborough was a parliamentary constituency in the West Riding of Yorkshire, comprising the two municipal boroughs of Brighouse and Spenborough and neighbouring areas. It returned one Member of Parliament (MP) to the House of Commons of the Parliament of the United Kingdom.

== Boundaries ==
1950–1955: The Borough of Brighouse, and the Urban Districts of Queensberry and Shelf, and Spenborough.

1955–1983: The Borough of Brighouse, the Urban District of Heckmondwike, and the Urban District of Spenborough (a borough from 29 July 1955).

== History ==
The constituency was created for the 1950 general election. The boundaries were redrawn for the 1955 general election: Queensbury and Shelf Urban District was transferred to Bradford South while Heckmondwike Urban District was added to this seat from the pre-1955 Dewsbury. These boundaries were used until the constituency's abolition for the 1983 general election.

In 1983 parliamentary seats were reorganised to reflect the changes in local government introduced in 1974. The area had become part of the Metropolitan County of West Yorkshire and was divided between two new constituencies: Batley and Spen (including Heckmondwike and Spenborough) and Calder Valley (including Brighouse). This seat's last MP, the Conservative Gary Waller, moved to the redrawn Keighley constituency, which he held until 1997.

== Members of Parliament ==
Election	Member	Party	Notes
1950	Frederick Cobb	Labour	Previously MP for Elland from 1945. Died March 1950
1950 by-election	John Edwards	Labour	Died November 1959
1960 by-election	Michael Shaw	National Liberal	
1964	Colin Jackson	Labour	
1970	Wilfred Proudfoot	Conservative	
Feb 1974	Colin Jackson	Labour	
1979	Gary Waller	Conservative	
1983	constituency abolished: see Batley and Spen & Calder Valley		

== Elections ==
=== Elections in the 1950s ===
General election 1950: Brighouse and Spenborough
Party	Candidate	Votes	%	±%
Labour	Frederick Cobb	25,588	52.17	
National Liberal	William Woolley	23,456	47.83	
Majority		2,132	4.34	
Turnout		49,044	88.04	
Labour win (new seat)				

1950 Brighouse and Spenborough by-election
Party	Candidate	Votes	%	±%
Labour	John Edwards	24,004	50.5	−1.71
National Liberal	William Woolley	23,567	49.5	+1.71
Majority		437	0.91	−3.43
Turnout		47,571	85.4	−2.6
Labour hold		Swing	−1.71	

General election 1951: Brighouse and Spenborough
Party	Candidate	Votes	%	±%
Labour	John Edwards	26,105	52.28	+0.11
National Liberal	William Woolley	23,828	47.72	−0.11
Majority		2,277	4.56	+0.21
Turnout		49,933	88.69	+0.65
Labour hold		Swing	+0.11	

General election 1955: Brighouse and Spenborough
Party	Candidate	Votes	%	±%
Labour	John Edwards	23,674	51.78	−0.50
National Liberal	Frederick William Howard Cook	22,048	48.22	+0.50
Majority		1,626	3.56	−1.00
Turnout		45,722	83.72	−4.97
Labour hold		Swing	-0.50	

General election 1959: Brighouse and Spenborough
Party	Candidate	Votes	%	±%
Labour	John Edwards	23,290	50.05	−1.73
National Liberal	Michael Shaw	23,243	49.95	+1.73
Majority		47	0.10	−3.46
Turnout		46,533	85.50	+1.78
Labour hold		Swing	-1.73	

=== Elections in the 1960s ===
1960 Brighouse and Spenborough by-election
Party	Candidate	Votes	%	±%
National Liberal	Michael Shaw	22,472	50.8	+0.9
Labour	Colin Jackson	21,806	49.2	−0.9
Majority		666	1.6	N/A
Turnout		44,278		
National Liberal gain from Labour		Swing	+0.8	

General election 1964: Brighouse and Spenborough
Party	Candidate	Votes	%	±%
Labour	Colin Jackson	20,734	44.16	−7.62
National Liberal	Michael Shaw	19,812	42.19	−6.03
Liberal	James Pickles	6,411	13.65	New
Majority		922	1.97	+3.47
Turnout		46,957	85.28	−0.22
Labour hold		Swing	-0.8	

General election 1966: Brighouse and Spenborough
Party	Candidate	Votes	%	±%
Labour	Colin Jackson	25,740	54.82	+10.66
Conservative	Cyril Donald Chapman	21,216	45.18	+2.99
Majority		4,524	9.64	+7.68
Turnout		46,956	83.96	−1.32
Labour hold		Swing	+3.80	

=== Elections in the 1970s ===
General election 1970: Brighouse and Spenborough
Party	Candidate	Votes	%	±%
Conservative	Wilf Proudfoot	22,953	46.3	+1.1
Labour	Colin Jackson	22,894	46.1	−8.7
Liberal	George Henry Manley	3,781	7.62	New
Majority		59	0.2	N/A
Turnout		49,628	80.54	−3.42
Conservative gain from Labour		Swing	+4.86	

General election February 1974: Brighouse and Spenborough
Party	Candidate	Votes	%	±%
Labour	Colin Jackson	22,107	41.04	−5.09
Conservative	Wilf Proudfoot	20,561	38.17	−8.08
Liberal	Patrick G Robertshaw	11,029	20.47	+12.85
Independent Democratic Alliance	Shirley Milner	169	0.31	New
Majority		1,546	2.87	N/A
Turnout		53,866	85.31	+4.77
Labour gain from Conservative		Swing	-1.99	

General election October 1974: Brighouse and Spenborough
Party	Candidate	Votes	%	±%
Labour	Colin Jackson	21,964	43.91	+2.87
Conservative	Wilf Proudfoot	19,787	39.56	+1.39
Liberal	John Smithson	8,265	16.52	−3.95
Majority		2,177	4.35	+1.48
Turnout		49,976	78.59	−6.72
Labour hold		Swing	+0.74	

General election 1979: Brighouse and Spenborough
Party	Candidate	Votes	%	±%
Conservative	Gary Waller	23,448	44.71	+5.15
Labour	Michael McGowan	21,714	41.41	−2.50
Liberal	R Thomas	7,278	13.88	−2.70
Majority		1,734	3.30	N/A
Turnout		52,440	80.17	+1.58
Conservative gain from Labour		Swing	+3.83	
