= Wilf Proudfoot =

British politician (1921–2013)

Member of Parliament for Brighouse and Spenborough
- In office 18 June 1970 – 8 February 1974
- Preceded by: Colin Jackson
- Succeeded by: Colin Jackson

Member of Parliament for Cleveland
- In office 8 October 1959 – 25 September 1964
- Preceded by: Arthur Palmer
- Succeeded by: James Tinn

Personal details
- Born: George Wilfred Proudfoot; 19 December 1921 Crook, County Durham, England
- Died: 19 July 2013 (aged 91) Scarborough, North Yorkshire, England
- Party: Conservative
- Spouse: Margaret "Peggy" Mary Jackson (m. 1950)
- Children: Mark, Lyn and Ian, Grandchildren - Marcus Proudfoot, Oliver Proudfoot, Luke Proudfoot, James-Ian Harvey, Victoria Harvey
- Occupation: Grocer, businessman, hypnotist

Military service
- Allegiance: United Kingdom
- Branch/service: Royal Air Force
- Years of service: 1940-1946
- Battles/wars: Second World War

George Wilfred Proudfoot (19 December 1921 – 19 July 2013) was a British Conservative Party politician and former Member of Parliament (MP). He was also a prominent North Yorkshire businessman, well known for his ownership of the Proudfoot supermarket chain and Radio 270. In later life he embarked on a new career as a hypnotist, hypnotherapist and NLP (Neuro Linguistic Practitioner) and Instructor. He died in July 2013.

== Early life ==
Proudfoot was born in Crook, County Durham where his father was manager of the local Broughs grocery shop. Broughs was a family-owned grocery chain serving Northern England. It was a British pioneer of the self-service model whereby customers took goods from open shelves and paid for them at a check-out desk rather than being served at a counter. Frank Proudfoot held a temporary commission of Second Lieutenant. He was awarded the Military Cross on 27 September 1918 during fighting near Ribécourt during the assault on Cambrai while serving in the York and Lancaster Regiment of the British army during the First World War. Frank Proudfoot had political ambitions but these were restrained by Broughs who refused to allow him to stand as a Conservative candidate in local council elections.

In his early years, Proudfoot helped his father in the shop by performing tasks such as filling blue bags with sugar. During the 1930s unemployment in Crook approached 40% and Proudfoot became familiar with the problems of retailing in a poor community. He was educated at a local council primary school but failed the 11-plus examination in spite of sitting it one year late after being "held back" a year. Subsequently, at age 14, he was sent to stay with three maiden aunts, Elsie, Beatty and Kitty, who ran the Sunningdale Guest House, Peasholm Park in Scarborough, where he attended Scarborough College, an independent school. After gaining the school certificate Proudfoot joined a Durham accounting practice as a trainee.

In 1940 Proudfoot was conscripted into the Royal Air Force (RAF) where he served two years at the RAF air base in Allahabad, Uttar Pradesh, North India. As an air mechanic fitter Proudfoot trained RAF personnel to maintain RAF aircraft on their way to the Burma front. He returned to India twice on Parliamentary delegations (once accompanied by his wife Peg) and with his sons separately on two other occasions. His last visit was in 2001 when he visited Kumbh Mela in Allahabad with his eldest son Mark. At age 79 he took a rowing boat on to the meeting place of the holy rivers Ganges (Ganga), Yamuna and Saraswati.

After a mixed career in the RAF, Proudfoot became an NCO and served in the education branch where he was responsible for providing basic instruction in English, mathematics and technical skills to new recruits, many of whom came from an educationally disadvantaged background. As a Training Instructor he "… taught hundreds of conscripts stuff they weren't really bothered about. He took it as a challenge to interest them and keep them entertained – an achievement he still remembers with pride".

Proudfoot married Margaret "Peg" Mary Jackson (1922–2019) in 1950 and the couple had three children (two sons Mark and Ian, and a daughter Lyn). Jackson had served in the Second World War as an army sergeant and later developed a career in marketing and ink sketch advertising. She undertook work for many high profile clients including Vogue magazine, Harrods, Jenners department store in Edinburgh and New York department stores; where her clothing artwork was published in national advertising campaigns. She was supportive of Proudfoot's business ventures and played a significant role in all of them.

== Proudfoot Supermarkets ==
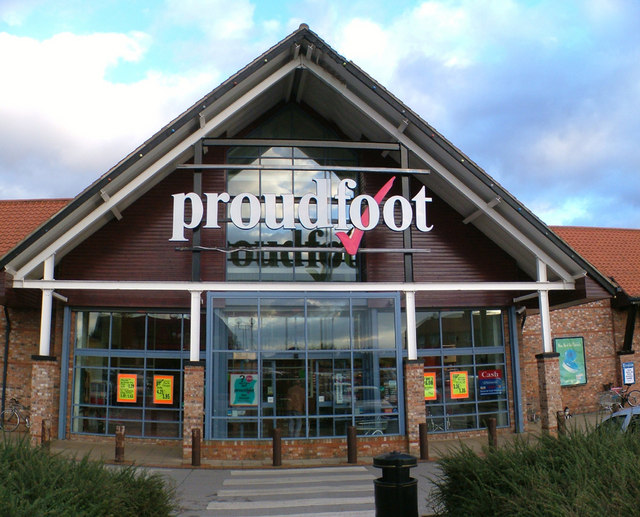
Proudfoot Supermarket, Barton-upon-Humber

After leaving the RAF in 1946, Proudfoot invested £300 from his RAF gratuity together with funds borrowed from family sources in buying a former blacksmiths in the village of Seamer, near Scarborough and fitting it out as a supermarket. He developed the business using the self-service and high volume/low price model that he had observed at Broughs in the 1930s and on an extended working trip to the USA in the mid-to-late 1950s. In 1954 he was able to open a second branch at Eastfield and by the mid 1970s the business had grown into a chain of 20 shops around North Yorkshire, the East Riding of Yorkshire and Northern Lincolnshire. Although, many of these were small convenience stores. Proudfoot acquired a large family house in Scalby Road, Scarborough and established his business headquarters in an annex of it. In 1981 the Proudfoots bought a villa in Spain for use as a holiday home.

Control of the Proudfoot Supermarkets business (G. W. Proudfoot Limited) eventually passed to Proudfoot's sons with Mark and Ian Proudfoot acting as managing directors until they both retired in March 2017. By 2008 some shops in the chain had been sold off strategically leaving the four at Seamer, Eastfield, Manham Hill and Scalby still in Proudfoot ownership. The company has a number of other commercial property and retail interests. In 2018 it employed 175 full and part-time staff, down from an earlier peak of 400 staff. The company has a headquarters and central distribution depot on the Eastfield Industrial Estate, outside Scarborough. In the year to 22 March 2018 the company achieved a net profit of £345,000 on a turnover of £16 million. The company remains under the control of the Proudfoot family, its core supplier is Nisa, the Co-operative Group owned distributor.

In July 2026, Proudfoot Supermarkets announced that three of their four shops, the ones at Seamer, Manham Hill and Newby, had been sold to Tesco. The shops formally ceased operating under the Proudfoot name on 4 October 2026. The Eastfield location was retained and became the sole remaining Proudfoot Supermarkets store.

== Political career ==
In 1950 Proudfoot became the youngest member of Scarborough Borough Council when he was elected as a councillor for the Conservative Party. He soon became a prominent local politician although his informal personal style did not always endear him to some people. He was once asked to leave the Scarborough Conservative Club when he entered it wearing jeans and a cardigan.

Proudfoot stood unsuccessfully for Parliament in Hemsworth at the 1951 general election and in Cleveland at the 1955 election.

He was successful on his third attempt, winning the Cleveland seat from the Labour MP Arthur Palmer at the 1959 general election. However, at the 1964 election, he was defeated by the Labour candidate James Tinn. Proudfoot contested the seat again at the 1966 general election, but lost by a much wider margin.

At the 1970 general election, he stood in the marginal West Yorkshire constituency of Brighouse and Spenborough, where he ousted the sitting Labour MP Colin Jackson by a majority of only 59 votes. However, at the February 1974 general election, Jackson won back the seat. Proudfoot stood again at the October 1974 election, but lost again.

Throughout his two terms in Parliament, Proudfoot was particularly vocal on matters relating to the retail sector. During his first term (1959 to 1964) he was an early advocate of decimal coinage and opposed the use of trading stamps. He supported capital punishment whenever that was debated. Proudfoot never held ministerial office although he served as Parliamentary Private Secretary to Sir Keith Joseph (minister of housing and local government) between 1961 and 1963. During his second term (1970 to 1974) he was very vocal on the subject of commercial radio while legislation to allow it was being enacted. Fellow MPs gave him the nickname "Radio Proudfoot". The main thrust of his interventions was an attempt to promote the local character of independent radio stations along the lines of the former offshore stations like Radio 270 (see below). In 1970 he engaged as his secretary one Christine Holman, who was later to marry the politician Neil Hamilton and become famous under her married name.

Proudfoot's attempts to find himself another seat in Parliament after 1974 were unsuccessful. However, he held a number of senior offices in Conservative Party bodies in the Yorkshire area.

== Radio 270 ==
In 1965 a group of local businessmen formed a consortium to promote a new pirate radio station to serve the North East coast from a ship to be anchored off Scarborough. After reading about this venture in a local newspaper, Proudfoot joined it and soon became its managing director. He was credited with putting the venture on a sound business footing.

He established the business as a limited company (Ellambar Investments Ltd) and attracted a large number of investors after addressing a public meeting at a Scarborough hotel. He warned investors that the venture was a high risk one and they should not expect a commercial return. Proudfoot's immediate influence on programming was to drop a plan to broadcast a mixture of light music and lifestyle material in favour of a simple Top 40 format. A 30-year-old, 150 tonne fishing vessel named Oceaan 7 was acquired and fitted out with a 10 kW radio transmitter for a total cost of £75,000. The radio station was named Radio 270 and it was run from Proudfoot's business headquarters in Scalby Road, Scarborough. Oceaan 7 was registered in Honduras in the name of Radio 270's programme director Noel Miller (an Australian national).

The station broadcast from June 1966 until August 1967. Although it attracted a large body of regular listeners (up to 4 million was claimed) its affairs were controversial. One issue was that Oceaan 7 was too small to operate comfortably off the exposed North East coast. By way of comparison with Radio 270's operation, Radio London ("the Big L") broadcast from the 650 tonne MV Galaxy in the sheltered Thames estuary. After Oceaan 7 nearly sank in a winter storm, several of the ship's crew and disc jockeys threatened to mutiny. There were ongoing arguments concerning the safety of the ship, terms of employment and financial policy. Proudfoot resolved disputes with company officers, staff and fellow investors by dismissing those concerned. He also gave airtime to political causes, such as support for the white minority regimes in Rhodesia and South Africa being voiced by Conservative MP Patrick Wall.

"The story of the station reads like a soap opera with staff mutinies, beleaguered DJs, technical nightmares, and power struggles" – BBC history of Radio 270

Although the Marine Broadcasting Offences Act 1967 brought about an early end to Radio 270, its brief life served to raise Proudfoot's public profile considerably and this may have contributed to his return to Parliament in 1970. Some of its employees such as Roger Gale, Paul Burnett and Philip Hayton went on to have distinguished careers in mainstream broadcasting. Maggie Lucas, the station's office manager later became secretary to the Chairman of the Australian Broadcasting Commission. It has been claimed that Radio 270 formed the factual basis for the 2009 film "The Boat That Rocked".

== Hypnotist ==
After leaving Parliament in 1974, Proudfoot became a regular visitor to the US where he developed an interest in hypnotism.

"Starting in 1977 he spent many months in America acquiring his Hypnosis and Therapeutic skills at the Hypnotism Training Institute of Los Angeles with Gil Boyne" – from the Proudfoot School website

In a 2008 newspaper interview Proudfoot also stated that he had been given a facelift operation in Beverly Hills in 1977. He lectured on hypnotism and hypnotherapy at venues around the world including ones in Spain, the US and the UK. He established the Proudfoot School of Clinical Hypnosis and Psychotherapy based in Scarborough where training courses in various aspects of hypnotism were delivered.

Parliament of the United Kingdom
Preceded by Arthur Palmer	Member of Parliament for Cleveland; 1959–1964	Succeeded by James Tinn
Preceded by Colin Jackson	Member of Parliament for Brighouse and Spenborough; 1970 – Feb 1974	Succeeded by Colin Jackson
