= William Mansfield (Labour MP) =

Former Labour MP from England

William Thomas Mansfield (1884 – 19 March 1939) was a British politician and trade unionist.

Born in Staithes in the North Riding of Yorkshire, Mansfield began working at the Grinkle Mines when he was thirteen years old. In 1908, he was elected as the mines' checkweighman and became active in the Labour Party. In 1911, he was elected to Hinderwell Urban District Council, then in 1919, to the North Riding County Council, in time becoming an alderman. Also in 1920, he was elected as general secretary of the Cleveland Miners' and Quarrymen's Association, then part of the Miners' Federation of Great Britain (MFGB).

At the 1924 general election, Mansfield stood in Cleveland for Labour, but was not elected. He stood again in 1929 and won the seat, but lost it at the 1931 general election, and failed to win it back in 1935.

In 1934, Mansfield took the Cleveland Miners and Quarrymen's Association out of the MFGB, instead merging into the National Union of General and Municipal Workers (NUGMW). It remained a distinct section of the NUGMW for two years, with Mansfield continuing as general secretary, after which he became an organiser for the union until his death in 1939.

Parliament of the United Kingdom
Preceded by Park Goff	Member of Parliament for Cleveland; 1929 – 1931	Succeeded by Robert Tatton Bower
