= Arthur Palmer (politician) =

British politician

Member of Parliament for Bristol North East (Bristol Central 1964–1974)
- In office 15 October 1964 – 13 May 1983
- Preceded by: Stan Awbery
- Succeeded by: Constituency abolished

Member of Parliament for Cleveland
- In office 23 October 1952 – 18 September 1959
- Preceded by: George Willey
- Succeeded by: Wilf Proudfoot

Member of Parliament for Wimbledon
- In office 5 July 1945 – 3 February 1950
- Preceded by: John Power
- Succeeded by: Cyril Black

Personal details
- Born: Arthur Montague Frank Palmer; 4 August 1912 Northam, Devon, England
- Died: 14 August 1994 (aged 82)
- Party: Labour Co-operative
- Spouse: Marion Woollaston
- Children: 2
- Education: Ashford County Grammar School
- Alma mater: Acton Technical College

Arthur Montague Frank Palmer (4 August 1912 – 14 August 1994) was a British Labour Co-operative politician. He was a Member of Parliament for three very separate constituencies over a period of nearly forty years.

== Early life ==
Palmer was born in Northam, Devon and educated at Ashford County Grammar School and Acton Technical College. He became a chartered electrical engineer and joined the head office staff of the Electrical Power Engineers' Association, editing the Electrical Power Engineer magazine. During World War II and the London Blitz he was an engineer at Battersea Power Station. He served as a councillor on Brentford and Chiswick Borough Council from 1937 to 1945 and later as a conservator of Wimbledon and Putney Commons.

== Parliamentary career ==
Palmer was elected Member of Parliament for Wimbledon in 1945, becoming the first Labour MP for the constituency. He lost in Merton and Morden in 1950 and 1951, but re-entered Parliament, representing Cleveland from a 1952 by-election to 1959, Bristol Central from 1964–February 1974, and Bristol North East from February 1974 to 1983.

Palmer was Chairman of the Parliamentary and Scientific Committee from 1965 to 1968, and Chairman of the House of Commons Select Committee on Science and Technology from 1966 to 1970 and 1974 to 1979.

== Personal life and death ==
In 1939, Palmer married Marion Woollaston, with whom he had two daughters, Professor Sarah Palmer (born 1943) and Julia King (born 1945). Sarah unsuccessfully attempted to be Labour's candidate for Hampstead and Highgate in 1990.

He died on 14 August 1994, aged 82.

Parliament of the United Kingdom
Preceded by John Power	Member of Parliament for Wimbledon; 1945 – 1950	Succeeded by Cyril Black
Preceded by Octavius George Willey	Member of Parliament for Cleveland; 1952 – 1959	Succeeded by Wilfred Proudfoot
Preceded by Stan Awbery	Member of Parliament for Bristol Central; 1964 – Feb 1974	Constituency abolished
Preceded by Robert Adley	Member of Parliament for Bristol North East; Feb 1974 – 1983	Constituency abolished
Trade union offices
Preceded by Laurence Welsh	President of the National Federation of Professional Workers; 1964–1966	Succeeded by John Dryden
