= Henry Fell Pease =

British politician

Pease in 1895.

Henry Fell Pease (28 April 1838 – 6 December 1896) was a coal and ironstone mine-owner from North East England and a Liberal politician who represented Cleveland.

Pease, a member of the prominent Quaker Pease family, was born at Middleton St. George, near Darlington, the eldest son of Henry Pease and his wife Anna Fell, daughter of Richard Fell of Uxbridge.

He was educated privately.

He became a partner in the family firm of Pease and Partners (Limited), who owned coal and ironstone mines and was also a director of the Stockton and Darlington Railway Co.

When Darlington was incorporated as a borough in 1868 he became a councillor, and was twice mayor of Darlington in 1874–75 and in 1894.

In 1881 and 1882, he was president of the National Liberal Federation.

He was a J.P. for County Durham and the North Riding of Yorkshire.

Pease was elected as MP for Cleveland in 1885 as a Liberal and held the seat until his death at the age of 58 at Brinkburn, Darlington.

In 1862, Pease married his second cousin, Elizabeth Pease, eldest daughter of John Beaumont Pease, of North Lodge, Darlington. She died at Brinkburn, Darlington on 24 February 1903. They had four sons and one daughter.

== See also ==
List of political families in the United Kingdom

Parliament of the United Kingdom
New constituency	Member of Parliament for Cleveland; 1885–1897	Succeeded by Alfred Edward Pease
Party political offices
Preceded by ?	President of the National Liberal Federation; 1881–1882	Succeeded by James Kitson
