= Charles Starmer =

English politician (1870–1933)

Sir Charles Walter Starmer
- Starmer in 1907

Member of Parliament for Cleveland
- In office 6 December 1923 – 9 October 1924
- Preceded by: Park Goff
- Succeeded by: Park Goff

Personal details
- Born: 12 July 1870 Haltham, Lincolnshire, England
- Died: 27 June 1933 (aged 62) Westminster, London, England
- Party: Liberal
- Spouses: Ada Cornforth (m. 1893; died 1923) Mary Cecilia Willink (m. 1929)

Charles Starmer

Sir Charles Walter Starmer (12 July 1870 – 27 June 1933) was a British newspaper proprietor and Liberal politician.

== Family ==
Charles Starmer was born in Haltham, near Horncastle in Lincolnshire but while he was still a child he moved with his family to the Cleveland area of the North Riding of Yorkshire. In 1893 he married Ada Cornforth and they had a daughter, Freda Marjorie Cornforth Starmer, born 14 September 1908 in Darlington died on 28 January 1935 aged 26 years. Ada Cornforth Starmer died in 1923, after a long illness and Starmer was married again in October 1929 to Mary Cecilia Willink, the daughter of John Wakefield Willink, Dean of Norwich. Lady Starmer was appointed OBE in 1948 and served as a Justice of the Peace, surviving him until 1979.

== Career ==
Starmer was a career journalist and went on to become one of the biggest newspaper proprietors of his day. He joined the commercial staff of The Northern Echo in West Hartlepool in 1899 working his way up to be its manager by 1908. Later he took over control of the Sheffield Independent, Birmingham Gazette, and other papers. As managing director of the Birmingham Gazette Ltd, the North of England Newspaper Co. Ltd, the Bradford and District Newspaper Co. Ltd and the Nottingham Journal, Ltd, he eventually controlled the publication of 30 provincial daily and weekly newspapers. At his death he was owner of the Westminster Press Group, also known as the Starmer Group. The company included the liberal newspaper the Westminster Gazette which had merged with the Daily News in 1928. He was a patron of the London School of Journalism

== Knighthood ==
Starmer was knighted for his public services in 1917. His newspaper businesses, political service and interests in labour questions and the condition of the north east of England were all mentioned in the context of his knighthood.

== Politics ==
Starmer was first elected a member of the Darlington Town Council in 1903, becoming an Alderman in 1915. He was Mayor of Darlington in 1907–08 and again in 1933. Starmer fought his first Parliamentary contest at the 1918 general election, when he stood as an independent Asquithian Liberal in the Sedgefield constituency in County Durham. He was selected to fight Darlington as an Independent Liberal for the 1922 general election, but did not stand as a candidate in the event, transferring instead to the Cleveland Division of the North Riding of Yorkshire, where he came second to the sitting Conservative MP, Sir Park Goff, in a three-cornered contest with Labour. Then, at the 1923 general election he stood again in Cleveland and this time was elected Liberal Member of Parliament, defeating Goff by a majority of 1,471 votes, again a three-cornered contest. However, in the Tory revival of 1924 Starmer was unable to hold on, this time falling to third place in another three-cornered fight. He fought the seat again at the 1929 general election but again came third, albeit in a tight three-way contest. He did not fight another Parliamentary election being too unwell to stand in 1931

Starmer was a Member of the Executive Committee of the National Liberal Federation from 1928 until his death. He also served as a Justice of the Peace.

== Death ==
He died on 27 June 1933 aged 62 years at his London home in Tufton Street, Westminster.

Parliament of the United Kingdom
Preceded by Sir Park Goff	Member of Parliament for Cleveland; 1923–1924	Succeeded by Sir Park Goff
