= George Willey =

British politician (1886–1952)

O.G. Willey MP CBE

Member of Parliament for Cleveland
- In office 5 July 1945 – 12 July 1952
- Preceded by: Robert Bower
- Succeeded by: Arthur Palmer

Personal details
- Born: Octavius George Willey; 12 January 1886
- Died: 12 July 1952 (aged 66) London
- Party: Labour

(Octavius) George Willey CBE (12 January 1886 – 12 July 1952) was a Labour Party politician in England. He was a Member of Parliament (MP) from 1945 until his death.

== Early career ==
Willey was responsible for running Teesside's Air Raid Precautions service during the Second World War. A trade unionist and campaigner, Willey first stood for Parliament at the 1923 general election in the Skipton constituency, but did not win a seat. He was unsuccessful again in Skipton at the 1924 election, and also in Birmingham West at the 1931 and 1935 general elections.

== Political career ==
Willey finally won a seat in the Labour landslide at the 1945 general election when he was elected for Cleveland; a seat which had only once before elected a Labour MP (in 1929). Willey had been one of ten official candidates selected by the National Union of General and Municipal Workers (NUGMW), alongside Tom Williamson and others; all ten were elected.

He was re-elected in 1950 and 1951, and was awarded a CBE for political and public services. He died in office in 1952, aged 66.

Parliament of the United Kingdom
Preceded by Robert Bower	Member of Parliament for Cleveland; 1945–1952	Succeeded by Arthur Palmer
