= Colin Jackson (politician) =

British politician, barrister, lecturer and writer

George Colin Jackson (6 December 1921 – 19 April 1981) was a British Labour Party politician, barrister, lecturer and writer.

Having unsuccessfully fought King's Lynn in 1959, he was twice Member of Parliament for the marginal constituency of Brighouse and Spenborough, in West Yorkshire. He was first elected at the 1964 general election, but at the 1970 election he lost his seat to the Conservative Wilfred Proudfoot, by a majority of only 59 votes. Jackson won the seat back at the February 1974 general election, held it in October 1974, and stood down at the 1979 general election.

Parliament of the United Kingdom
Preceded by Michael Shaw	Member of Parliament for Brighouse and Spenborough; 1964–1970	Succeeded by Wilfred Proudfoot
Preceded by Wilfred Proudfoot	Member of Parliament for Brighouse and Spenborough; Feb 1974–1979	Succeeded by Gary Waller
