= Cleveland and Whitby =

UK Parliament constituency (1974–1983)

- Former county constituency for the House of Commons

February 1974–1983
- Seats: One
- Created from: Cleveland, Scarborough & Whitby
- Replaced by: Langbaurgh, Scarborough

Cleveland and Whitby was a parliamentary constituency centred on the town of Whitby in northern England. It returned one Member of Parliament (MP) to the House of Commons of the Parliament of the United Kingdom from February 1974 until it was abolished for the 1983 general election.

Cleveland and Whitby largely replaced the previous Cleveland constituency. It was defined as covering the urban districts of Guisborough, Loftus, Saltburn and Marske by the Sea, Skelton and Brotton, Whitby, along with Whitby Rural District.

== Members of Parliament ==
Election	Member	Party
Feb 1974	Leon Brittan	Conservative
1983	constituency abolished	

== Election results ==
=== Elections in the 1970s ===
General election 1979: Cleveland and Whitby
Party	Candidate	Votes	%	±%
Conservative	Leon Brittan	26,735	51.00	
Labour	Ben Pimlott	19,818	36.80	
Liberal	Michael Ford Pitts	5,870	11.20	
Majority		6,917	13.20	
Turnout		52,423	80.05	
Conservative hold		Swing		

General election October 1974: Cleveland and Whitby
Party	Candidate	Votes	%	±%
Conservative	Leon Brittan	19,973	43.22	
Labour	Ben Pimlott	18,445	39.91	
Liberal	GG Watson	7,795	16.87	
Majority		1,528	3.33	
Turnout		46,203	76.17	
Conservative hold		Swing		

General election February 1974: Cleveland and Whitby
Party	Candidate	Votes	%	±%
Conservative	Leon Brittan	21,090	42.55	
Labour	JB Hewitson	17,448	35.20	
Liberal	GG Watson	11,030	22.25	
Majority		3,642	7.35	
Turnout		49,568	82.38	
Conservative win (new seat)				
