= Michael Shaw, Baron Shaw of Northstead =

British politician (1920–2021)

The Lord Shaw of Northstead DL
- Shaw in the Lords Chamber, 2010

Member of Parliament for Scarborough Scarborough and Whitby (1966–Feb 1974)
- In office 31 March 1966 – 16 March 1992
- Preceded by: Alexander Spearman
- Succeeded by: John Sykes

Member of Parliament for Brighouse and Spenborough
- In office 17 March 1960 – 25 September 1964
- Preceded by: John Edwards
- Succeeded by: Colin Jackson

Member of the House of Lords
- Lord Temporal
- Life peerage 30 September 1994 – 31 March 2015

Personal details
- Born: 9 October 1920 Leeds, West Riding of Yorkshire, England
- Died: 8 January 2021 (aged 100)

Michael Norman Shaw, Baron Shaw of Northstead, DL (9 October 1920 – 8 January 2021) was a National Liberal and British Conservative Party politician who served as a Member of Parliament (MP) from 1960 to 1964 (as a National Liberal) and from 1966 to 1992 for the Conservatives.

== Career ==
Shaw was born in Leeds, and educated at Sedbergh School. Standing first as a Conservative at the general election in May 1955, Shaw fought the safe Labour seat of Dewsbury, losing by over 7,000 votes. At the general election in October 1959, he stood as a 'Liberal and Conservative' and contested the Labour-held marginal constituency of Brighouse and Spenborough. He lost by only 47 votes to the sitting MP Lewis John Edwards, who died the following month.

At the resulting by-election in March 1960, Shaw won the seat for the National Liberals and Conservatives with a majority of 666 votes over Labour's Colin Jackson. Jackson regained the seat from Shaw for Labour at the 1964 general election, however, by a majority of 922. Shaw returned to Parliament at the 1966 general election, when he was elected for the safe Conservative constituency of Scarborough and Whitby; he was a Conservative for the rest of his political career. He held that seat until it was abolished for the February 1974 general election, when he was re-elected for the new Scarborough constituency. He continued to represent Scarborough until he retired at the 1992 general election, making a total of 30 years as an MP. He also served as a Member of the European Parliament (MEP) from 1974 until 1979, when MEPs were not directly elected, but were chosen by the House of Commons and House of Lords as delegates.

In the 1982 Birthday Honours Shaw received a Knighthood, having the accolade conferred by Queen Elizabeth II on 25 November 1982. Shaw was created a life peer on 30 September 1994 with the title Baron Shaw of Northstead, of Liversedge in the County of West Yorkshire. He retired from the House of Lords on 31 March 2015. Shaw was interviewed in 2012 as part of The History of Parliament's oral history project.

== Personal life ==
Shaw died on 8 January 2021 at the age of 100. He was married to his wife Joan for 69 years. He was a father and grandfather, and latterly lived in Winchester. At the time of his death, he was the earliest elected living former National Liberal MP, and the oldest living former Conservative or National Liberal MP, being the only such surviving centenarian from either party.

Coat of arms of Michael Shaw, Baron Shaw of Northstead

Crest
Out of a circle of roses Argent barbed and seeded Proper the hulk of a lymphad Azure rising therefrom a square stone tower also Proper all in front of a sun in splendour Gold.
Escutcheon
Or issuant from a triple mount in base three trees an arrow in flight fesswise to the dexter between their trunks all Proper on a chief wavy Azure an estoile Argent between two roses also Argent barbed and seeded Proper each environed by a crescent Gold.
Supporters
On either side a ram Argent gorged bezanty armed Or and unguled Sable each resting the interior hind foot upon a fishing net covering a glass float all upon a compartment representative of a quayside Proper.
Motto
Pro Familia Et Amicis

Parliament of the United Kingdom
Preceded by John Edwards	Member of Parliament for Brighouse and Spenborough; 1960–1964	Succeeded by Colin Jackson
Preceded by Sir Alexander Spearman	Member of Parliament for Scarborough and Whitby; 1966–Feb 1974	Constituency abolished
New constituency	Member of Parliament for Scarborough; Feb 1974–1992	Succeeded by John Sykes
