= Middlesbrough by-election =

Middlesbrough by-election or similar terms may refer to:

- 1878 Middlesbrough by-election
- 1928 Middlesbrough West by-election
- 1940 Middlesbrough West by-election
- 1945 Middlesbrough West by-election
- 1962 Middlesbrough East by-election
- 1962 Middlesbrough West by-election
- 2012 Middlesbrough by-election
