= 1945 Middlesbrough West by-election =

UK parliamentary by-election

The 1945 Middlesbrough West by-election was a parliamentary by-election held on 14 May 1945 for the British House of Commons constituency of Middlesbrough West.

== Previous MP ==
The seat had become vacant when the constituency's Liberal Member of Parliament, Harcourt Johnstone died on 1 March 1945, aged 49.

Johnstone was elected unopposed as the constituency's MP at a by-election in 1940, caused by the previous Liberal MP Frank Kingsley Griffith becoming a County Court Judge. Johnstone had previously served as MP for Willesden East from 1923–24 and for South Shields from 1931–35.

== Candidates ==
The election took place during the Second World War. Under an agreement between the Conservative, Labour and Liberal parties; who were participating in a wartime coalition, the party holding a seat would not be opposed by the other two at a by-election. Accordingly, the Liberal Party nominated a candidate, but no Labour or Conservative representative was put forward. As no one else was nominated, there was an unopposed return and no poll took place.

The Liberal Party candidate, supporting the coalition government, was the war hero Air Vice Marshal Donald Clifford Tyndall Bennett (14 September 1910 – 15 September 1986). After winning the by-election, he only served in Parliament between May and June 1945. Bennett was defeated by Geoffrey Cooper of the Labour Party at the 1945 general election.

Bennett stood as a Liberal candidate at the 1948 Croydon North by-election and at Norwich North in 1950. In the 1960s, he was a National Party candidate at the 1967 Nuneaton by-election.

== Result ==
14 May 1945 by-election: Middlesbrough West
Party	Candidate	Votes	%	±%
Liberal	Don Bennett	Unopposed	N/A	N/A
Liberal hold				

== See also ==
- Middlesbrough West constituency
- List of United Kingdom by-elections
- United Kingdom by-election records
