= Ian Wrigglesworth =

British politician (born 1939)

The Right Honourable The Lord Wrigglesworth
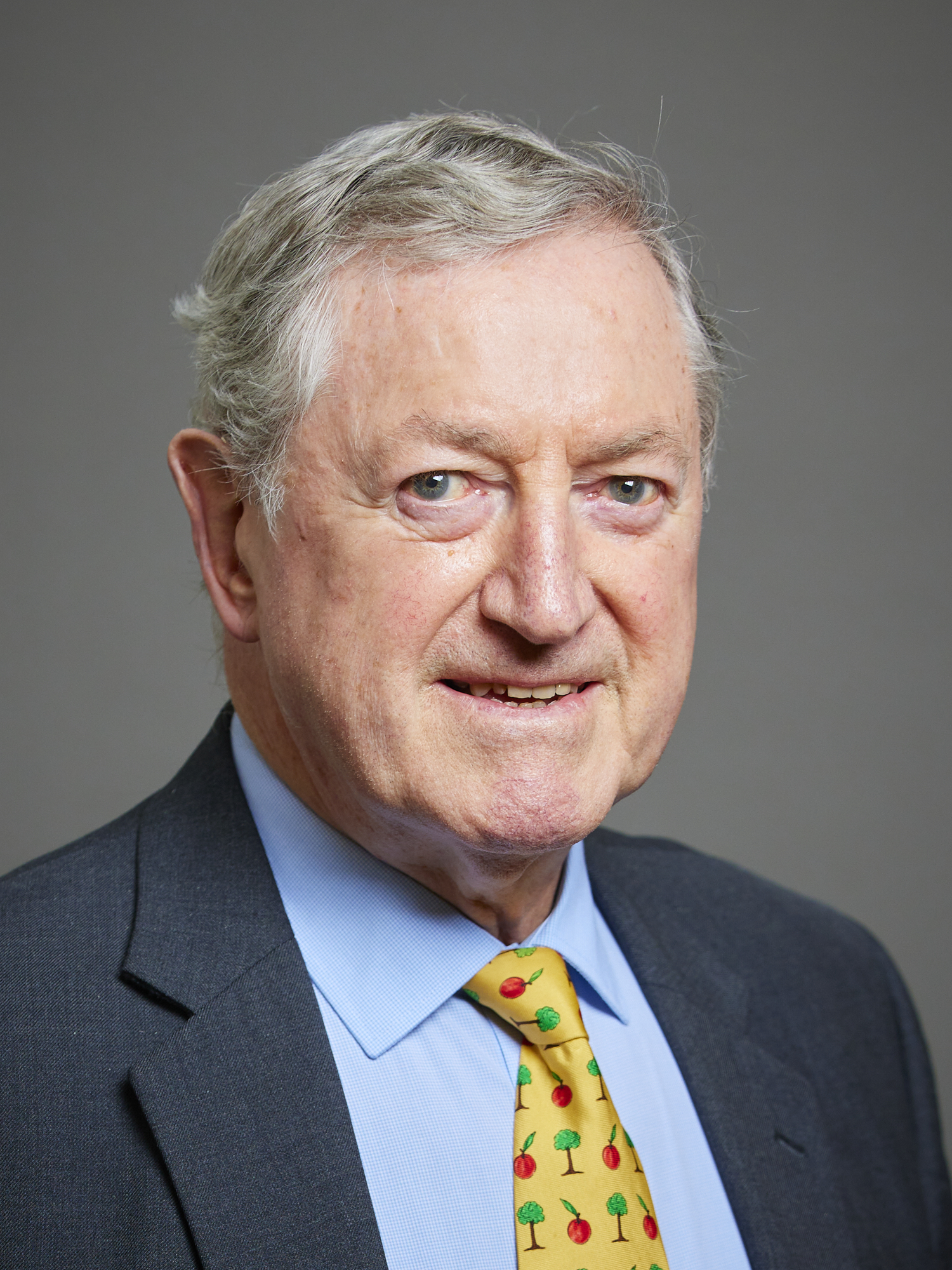
- Official portrait, 2023

Member of the House of Lords
- Lord Temporal
- Life peerage 5 September 2013

President of the Liberal Democrats
- In office 1 January 1989 – 31 December 1990
- Leader: Paddy Ashdown
- Preceded by: Adrian Slade (Liberal); John Cartwright (SDP)
- Succeeded by: Charles Kennedy

Member of Parliament for Stockton South Thornaby (1974-1983)
- In office 28 February 1974 – 18 May 1987
- Preceded by: John Sutcliffe (Middlesbrough West)
- Succeeded by: Tim Devlin

Personal details
- Born: Ian William Wrigglesworth; 8 December 1939 (age 86) Stockton-on-Tees, County of Durham, United Kingdom
- Party: Labour (until 1981); SDP (1981–1988); Liberal Democrats (1988–present)
- Spouse: Tricia Wrigglesworth
- Children: 3
- Education: College of St Mark and St John, Chelsea

Ian William Wrigglesworth, Baron Wrigglesworth (born 8 December 1939) is an English politician and Liberal Democrat peer. He served as President of the Liberal Democrats from 1989 to 1990.

== Education ==
He was born in Stockton-on-Tees, brought up in Norton-on-Tees, and educated at Stockton Grammar School, Stockton-Billingham Technical College, and the College of St Mark and St John, Chelsea, where he qualified as a music teacher.

== Political career ==
Between 1974 and 1981, Wrigglesworth was Labour and Co-operative Member of Parliament for Thornaby. Shortly after he was elected to Parliament, he was a founder member of the Manifesto Group and with John Cartwright helped found the Campaign for Labour Victory under the leadership of Bill Rodgers. From 1974 to 1979, he was parliamentary private secretary to the Home Secretary, Roy Jenkins, and when Labour returned to Opposition in 1979, he was appointed Shadow Minister for the Civil Service by James Callaghan.

However, Wrigglesworth became increasingly disillusioned by the leftward direction the Labour Party was taking and became part of the nucleus of Labour MPs who contemplated leaving the party in 1979 and 1980. In 1981, Wrigglesworth became one of the founding members of the Social Democratic Party (SDP), and with Mike Thomas organised the launch of the new party in March of that year. He was one of only six SDP Members of Parliament to be returned to the House of Commons in the 1983 general election, when he narrowly won the newly created constituency of Stockton South by 102 votes following the revelation that his Conservative opponent had once been a member of the National Front. In the 1987 general election, the Conservative candidate Tim Devlin narrowly defeated Wrigglesworth by 774 votes.

After the merger of SDP and the Liberals in 1988, Wrigglesworth was elected the first president of the new Social and Liberal Democrats and served a tumultuous two-year term as president, where he helped to guide the new party through a financial crisis, its disastrous showing in the 1989 European Parliamentary election, and its change in name to the Liberal Democrats. Wrigglesworth was knighted in 1991 and, although he has been active in the business community in the North East since that time, he has retained his involvement with the Liberal Democrats. He was awarded an Honorary Doctorate of Music by the University of Northumbria in December 2011 and an Honorary Doctorate of Business Administration by the University of Teesside in October 2012.

Wrigglesworth was chairman of the Liberal Democrat Trustees until February 2012. At the Liberal Democrat Spring Conference 2012, held at The Sage Gateshead, it was announced that he had taken up the post of treasurer of the party, which he held until December 2015.

== Peerage ==
It was announced that he would be elevated to the House of Lords in August 2013 and on 5 September 2013, he was created a life peer, as Baron Wrigglesworth, of Norton-on-Tees in the County of Durham.

== Memberships ==
Until February 2012, Wrigglesworth was deputy chairman of the Government's Regional Growth Fund Advisory Panel, which was chaired by Lord Heseltine and appointed by the government to consider bids. He is chairman of a Durham-based property company and was chairman of the Port of Tyne until August 2012. From 1995 to January 2009, he was the executive chairman of UK Land Estates and prior to that was executive deputy chairman of the Teesside-based Livingston Group and an executive director of its associate company Fairfield Industries. From 1996 until 2000, he was chairman of the public policy company, Prima Europe, and then chairman of its successor, GPC, after Prima was acquired by Omnicom. He has also been a non-executive director of a number of other private and public companies.

He was founder chairman of the NewcastleGateshead Initiative, the private/public sector partnership responsible for the destination marketing of Newcastle and Gateshead and its bid for European Capital of Culture 2008, which was won by Liverpool. From 2005 to 2009, he was the chairman of the Baltic Centre for Contemporary Art in Gateshead. Under his chairmanship he appointed internationally experienced director Peter Doroshenko, and after Doroshenko's departure he was then responsible for the appointment of Godfrey Wordsdale, and discussions with the University of Northumbria began, leading to the current partnership between the two institutions BALTIC x Northumbria University Institute (BxNU) which co-delivers teaching, mentorship, and research.

Prior to becoming a Member of Parliament, he worked in the City at National Giro Bank and began his working life in Middlesbrough at the Midland Bank. He is a former chairman of the Northern Region CBI and was founder chairman of the Northern Business Forum. Until 2002, he was deputy chairman of the governors of the University of Teesside (formerly Teesside Polytechnic).

== Personal life ==
He is married to Tricia, who was a health visitor, and has two sons and a daughter.

Parliament of the United Kingdom
New constituency	Member of Parliament for Thornaby; Feb 1974 – 1983	Constituency abolished
New constituency	Member of Parliament for Stockton South; 1983–1987	Succeeded by Tim Devlin
Party political offices
Preceded by Adrian Slade; President of the Liberal Party; Shirley Williams; President of the Social Democratic Party	President of the Liberal Democrats; 1988–1990	Succeeded by Charles Kennedy
Preceded by Richard Duncalf	Liberal Democrat Treasurer; 2012–present	Incumbent
Orders of precedence in the United Kingdom
Preceded by The Lord Mendelsohn	Gentlemen; Baron Wrigglesworth	Followed by The Lord Bourne of Aberystwyth
