= 1928 Middlesbrough West by-election =

UK parliamentary by-election

The 1928 Middlesbrough West by-election was a parliamentary by-election held for the British House of Commons constituency of Middlesbrough West on 7 March 1928.

== Vacancy ==
The by-election was caused by the death of the sitting Liberal MP, Trevelyan Thomson who had held the seat since 1918. Although Middlesbrough West had been Liberal since 1918 and the predecessor seat of Middlesbrough had been Liberal since 1886 (with the exception of the 1900 general election), no recent contest had been three-cornered and Trevelyan Thompson had made the seat so much his own that he had not even been opposed in 1924. So, there was no reliable way of knowing how the votes would fall.

== Candidates ==
=== Liberals ===
The Liberals selected Frank Kingsley Griffith, a thirty-eight-year-old barrister from London and formerly unsuccessful candidate at Bromley at the general elections of 1922, 1923 and 1924. Griffith was also Chairman of the National League of Young Liberals. It was reported that Trevelyan Thomson's wife, Hilda, had been approached as a possible candidate in succession to her husband but that her health ruled her out.

=== Unionists ===
The Unionists chose as their candidate, local councillor and businessman Stanley Sadler. Sadler was the son of Samuel Sadler the first Conservative Member of Parliament for Middlesbrough and the founder of Sadler & Company, a chemicals business. Stanley Sadler was a former Mayor of Middlesbrough.

=== Labour ===
The candidate adopted for the Labour Party was also a local councillor. Huddersfield born Alonzo Ralph Ellis was a trade union official and councillor in Bradford.

The adoption of these candidates meant this was the first three-cornered contest in the constituency since it was created in 1918.

== Issues ==
Griffith issued his election address on 24 February, declaring himself an out and out Free Trader and stating that never before had Free Trade been so vital to industrial recovery at home and international amity abroad. The government's policy of protectionism was not applicable to the great national industries like iron and steel or shipping. He urged the government to put in hand great schemes of work and to allow local authorities to do the same to improve the infrastructure and create employment. It was ludicrous he argued to be paying the unemployed benefit to do nothing while improvement schemes such those at Middlesbrough docks were held up because of poor government accounting. Ellis countered by declaring that what was wanted was 100% socialism. The government must intervene to provide employment – or work with a capital W, in his words. Sadler had previously put forward an argument that those receiving poor law relief (unemployment benefit) should lose their right to vote if they refused to take work. He was challenged on this during the campaign and said that at a time of high unemployment this should not apply as people were out of work through no fault of their own but in better economic times a man who would not work should not be entitled to vote. It was reported however that Sadler was a strong defender of the Unionist government record in office and was particularly assured on the questions of safeguarding in industry (protectionism) and the economy.

== Result ==
The result was a narrow hold for the Liberals over Labour, a margin of just 89 votes, with the Tories in third place.

Kingsley Griffith

1928 Middlesbrough West by-election Electorate
Party	Candidate	Votes	%	±%
Liberal	Frank Kingsley Griffith	10,717	36.2	N/A
Labour	Alonzo Ralph Ellis	10,628	36.0	New
Unionist	Stanley Sadler	8,213	27.8	New
Majority		89	0.2	N/A
Turnout		29,558	83.2	N/A
Liberal hold		Swing	N/A	

The poll showed that the popularity of the government was waning. Sadler and the Unionists had been expecting a higher vote and Labour advanced to a strong second place, presaging their win at the 1929 general election. For the Liberals the retention of the seat was a relief. The result of this by-election came on the same day as the by-election in St Ives in Cornwall, which was a Liberal gain from the Unionists. This double triumph for the Liberal Party was a boost to party morale, renewed under the dynamic leadership of Lloyd George and to the radical policy agenda of the coloured books and the manifesto We Can Conquer Unemployment being produced at this time.

== Aftermath ==
Despite his slim majority this time however Griffith went on to hold the seat at the general elections of 1929, 1931 and 1935, the last of these in a three-cornered fight against Labour and National Labour opponents. When Griffith was appointed a county court judge in 1940, the seat was retained for the Liberals by Harcourt Johnstone in the resulting by-election, although under the wartime truce between the political parties, he was not opposed. Stanley Sadler clearly did not find national level politics congenial as he never fought another Parliamentary election. A R Ellis tried to win Middlesbrough West again in 1929 and then unsuccessfully contested Nottingham South in 1931. This turned out to be a false dawn for the Liberals however, as the result of the 1929 general election produced a strong advance in terms of the popular vote and percentage of poll share but only a modest improvement in the number of seats held overall.

== See also ==
- 1940 Middlesbrough West by-election
- 1945 Middlesbrough West by-election
- List of United Kingdom by-elections
- United Kingdom by-election records
