= Rettie =

Rettie is a toponymic surname of local origin from the old lands Reattie or Raittie in the parish of Innerboyndie, Banffshire. These lands were granted to Gilbert de Dun by David II of Scotland in 1368.

Willmus (latinised version of William) Rettie was elected to the Common Council of the Burgh of Aberdeen in 1474.

Notable people with the surname include:

- Jodie Rettie (born 1990), Scottish rugby player
- John Rettie (1925–2009), British newspaper journalist and broadcaster
- Samuel Rettie (1818–1883), Canadian merchant, shipbuilder, and politician
