= George Scott (broadcaster) =

British broadcaster

George Edwin Scott (22 June 1925 – 2 November 1988) was a British author, television commentator, broadcaster, journalist and Liberal Party politician. He was editor of The Listener for five years.

== Background ==
Scott was born the son of George Benjamin Scott and Florence Hilda Scott. He was educated at Middlesbrough High School. From 1943 to 1946 he served in the Royal Navy Volunteer Reserve and from 1946 to 1948 he attended New College, Oxford. In 1947 he married Shelagh Maud Isobel Maw. They had one daughter, Susan (1949–83) and two sons, Alexander (1955–2008) and Daniel (born 1962).

== Professional career ==
Scott was a journalist who worked on The Northern Echo (1941–42), The Yorkshire Post (1942–1943) and the Daily Express (1948–53). He moved to work on the periodical Truth in 1953. He became deputy editor in 1954 and editor from 1954 to 1957, when it ceased publication. In 1956 his autobiographical work Time and Place was published. He became a television broadcaster, first as a member of the Panorama team (1958–59). He was chairman and interviewer for Television Wales and the West (1959–67). He had spells working at Rediffusion (1966–68) and Tyne-Tees (1970–74). He returned to journalism to work for The Economist from 1970 to 1974. He wrote Rise and Fall of the League of Nations in 1973. He was editor of The Listener from 1974 to 1979. He was presenter of The Editors on the BBC from 1976 to 1979. He was head of the UK Offices of the EEC from 1979 to 1987. He was Special Adviser to the Commission of the European Communities from 1987 to 1988.

== Political career ==
Scott was chairman of the Political Division of the Liberal Party from 1962 to 1963. He was Liberal candidate for the Middlesbrough East division at the March 1962 by-election, for Middlesbrough West at the June 1962 by-election, for Wimbledon at the 1964 general election, and finally for South West Surrey at the 1983 general election. He did not stand for parliament again.

=== Electoral record ===
1962 Middlesbrough East by-election
Party	Candidate	Votes	%	±%
Labour	Arthur Bottomley	18,928	60.6	−0.9
Liberal	George Scott	7,145	22.9	n/a
Conservative	Frederick A. S. Wood	4,613	14.8	−23.7
Union Movement	Jeffrey Hamm	550	1.8	n/a
Majority		11,783	37.7	+14.6
Turnout		31,236	52.1	−24.1
Labour hold		Swing		

1962 Middlesbrough West by-election
Party	Candidate	Votes	%	±%
Labour	Jeremy Bray	15,095	39.7	+4.2
Conservative	Bernard Connelly	12,825	33.7	−21.2
Liberal	George Scott	9,829	25.8	+16.2
Independent	Russell Ernest Eckley	189	0.5	
Independent	Malcolm Thompson	117	0.3	
Majority		2,270	6.0	
Turnout		38,055		
Labour gain from Conservative		Swing		

General Election 1964: Wimbledon
Party	Candidate	Votes	%	±%
Conservative	Cyril Black	15,952	52.0	
Labour	John R. Daly	8,891	29.0	
Liberal	George Scott	5,817	19.0	
Majority		7,061	23.0	
Turnout		30,660	74.9	
Conservative hold		Swing		

General Election 1983: South West Surrey
Party	Candidate	Votes	%	±%
Conservative	Maurice Macmillan	31,067	59.7	N/A
Liberal	George Scott	16,716	32.1	N/A
Labour	Stephen Williams	4,239	8.2	N/A
Majority		14,351	27.6	N/A
Turnout		52,022	74.5	N/A
Conservative win (new seat)				
