= Don Bennett =

Royal Air Force Air-Vice Marshal (1910–1986)

Donald Bennett
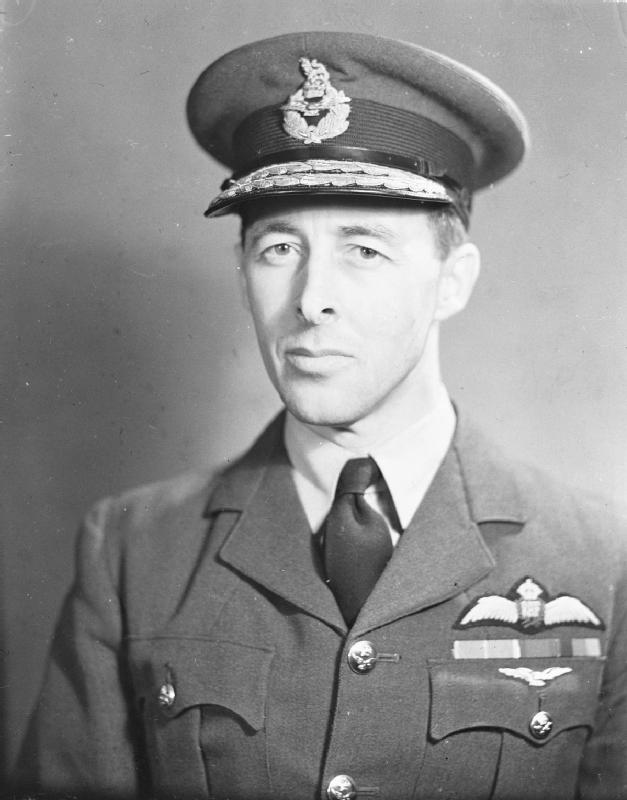
- Air Vice Marshal Don Bennett c. 1943–44

Member of Parliament for Middlesbrough West
- In office 14 May 1945 – 5 July 1945
- Preceded by: Harcourt Johnstone
- Succeeded by: Geoffrey Cooper

Personal details
- Born: Donald Clifford Tyndall Bennett; 14 September 1910 Toowoomba, Queensland, Australia
- Died: 15 September 1986 (aged 76) Slough, Berkshire, England
- Party: Conservative (1944); Liberal (1945–1950); National (1967); National Independence (1970s)

Military service
- Allegiance: Australia; United Kingdom
- Branch/service: Royal Australian Air Force (1930–31, 1935–36); Royal Air Force (1931–35, 1941–45)
- Years of service: 1930–1936; 1940–1945
- Rank: Air vice marshal
- Commands: No. 8 (Pathfinder Force) Group (1943–45); Pathfinder Force (1942–43); No. 10 Squadron (1942); No. 77 Squadron (1941–42)
- Battles/wars: Second World War
- Awards: Companion of the Order of the Bath; Commander of the Order of the British Empire; Distinguished Service Order; King's Commendation for Valuable Service in the Air; Order of Alexander Nevsky (USSR)
- Other work: Director of British South American Airways

Air Vice Marshal Donald Clifford Tyndall Bennett, CB, CBE, DSO (14 September 1910 – 15 September 1986) was an Australian-born British aviation pioneer and bomber pilot who rose to be the youngest air vice marshal in the Royal Air Force. He led the "Pathfinder Force" (No. 8 Group RAF) from 1942 to the end of the Second World War in 1945. He has been described as "one of the most brilliant technical airmen of his generation: an outstanding pilot, a superb navigator who was also capable of stripping a wireless set or overhauling an engine".

== Early flights ==
Donald Bennett was born the youngest son of a grazier and business agent in Toowoomba, Queensland. He attended Brisbane Grammar School. After some time working in his father's business, he joined the Royal Australian Air Force in 1930, qualifying at RAAF Point Cook as a pilot on the DH Moth and Westland Wapiti. He transferred to the Royal Air Force a year later. Starting with the flying boats of 210 Squadron, Bennett developed a passion for accurate flying and precise navigation that would never leave him. After a period as an instructor at RAF Calshot, he left the service in 1935 (retaining a reserve commission) to join Imperial Airways. Over the next five years, Bennett specialised in long-distance flights, breaking a number of records and pioneering techniques which would later become commonplace, notably air-to-air refuelling. In 1936 he wrote the first edition of his The complete air navigator: covering the syllabus for the flight navigator's licence (Pitman, London) which he updated several times up to the seventh edition in 1967. In July 1938 he piloted the Mercury part of the Short Mayo Composite flying-boat across the Atlantic; this flight earned him the Oswald Watt Gold Medal for that year.

== Second World War ==
During 1940 Bennett's long-distance expertise was set to work setting up the Atlantic Ferry Organization tasked with the wartime delivery of thousands of aircraft manufactured in the United States and Canada to the United Kingdom. At that time, a transatlantic flight was a significant event, but the Atlantic Ferry project proved remarkably successful and demonstrated that with suitable training even inexperienced pilots could safely deliver new aircraft across the North Atlantic.

Bennett was recommissioned in 1941 in the Royal Air Force Volunteer Reserve as a squadron leader. His first task was to oversee the formation of the Elementary Air Navigation School, Eastbourne, for the initial training of observers (later navigators). However, he was promoted to wing commander, and appointed to the command of No. 77 Squadron, based at RAF Leeming and flying Whitleys in 4 Group, Bomber Command, on 7 December 1941.

In April 1942, No. 77 Squadron was transferred to Coastal Command and Bennett was given command of No. 10 Squadron (Handley Page Halifax) and shortly afterwards led a raid on the German battleship Tirpitz. Shot down during that raid, he evaded capture and escaped to Sweden, from where he was able to return to Britain; he and his copilot were awarded the Distinguished Service Order (DSO) on 16 June 1942.

=== Pathfinder Force ===
In July 1942, Bennett was appointed to command the new Pathfinder Force (PFF), an elite unit tasked with improving RAF Bomber Command's navigation. At this stage of the war, Bomber Command had begun to make night-time raids deep into Germany, but had not yet been able to cause significant damage, largely because only about a quarter of the bomb loads were delivered "on target" — and this at a time when "on target" was defined as within three miles of the aim point.

Pathfinder Force was set up to lead the bomber stream to the target areas and drop markers for the remainder of the force to aim at. Later in the war, the Pathfinder Force would be equipped with a range of newly developed and often highly effective electronic aids, but the initial object was to simply take experienced crews with standard equipment and hone their navigation skills.

Having already demonstrated that he could pass on his meticulous navigational ability to others, Bennett was an obvious choice for the role, yet nevertheless a surprising one. The Air Ministry's Directorate of Bomber Operations had for some time been pushing to establish an elite precision bombing force, but Bomber Command AOC-in-C Air Chief Marshal Arthur Harris was implacably opposed to the idea on the grounds that it would "lower the morale" of the other squadrons.

When Harris learned that Vice-Chief of the Air Staff (VCAS) Air Chief Marshal Sir Wilfrid Freeman planned to order the change, and that the strong-willed Basil Embry would probably be given command of the new force, Harris bowed to the inevitable, but was given a "more or less free hand" in selection of the force commander. He chose to appoint Bennett without considering other candidates. Harris described Bennett as "the most efficient airman I have ever met". Bennett was called to Bomber Command HQ when he was on the point of leaving with his squadron for the Middle East. There he was informed by Harris that he was to lead a special force to make use of the new bombing and navigational aids then available and the more sophisticated ones that would follow. With effect from 5 July he was promoted to group captain.

In 1943 Bennett was promoted with the upgrading of PFF to group status to air commodore, and then in December to acting air vice marshal – the youngest ever to hold that rank – giving him a rank similar to those of the other commanders of groups. He remained in command of the Pathfinder Force until the end of the war, overseeing its growth to an eventual 19 squadrons, a training flight and a meteorological flight, working relentlessly to improve its standards, and tirelessly campaigning for better equipment, in particular for more Mosquitos and Lancasters to replace the diverse assortment of often obsolete aircraft with which the force started.

Bennett was not a popular leader: a personally difficult and naturally aloof man, he earned a great deal of respect from his crews but little affection. As Harris wrote, "he could not suffer fools gladly, and by his own high standards there were many fools". Nor did Bennett get on well with the other RAF group commanders: not only was he 20 years younger, he was an Australian. Indeed, Bennett saw his own appointment in those terms: it was, he believed, a victory for the "players" over the "gentlemen". There was antagonism between Bennett and Air Vice-Marshal Ralph Cochrane of No. 5 Group. In 5 Group's 617 Squadron, Cochrane had his own specialist squadron pursuing high levels of accuracy.

== Post-war career ==
Despite the unquestioned achievements of No. 8 Group, at the end of the war Bennett was the only bomber group commander not to be knighted. He resigned his commission in the RAF, and returned to private life to pursue a variety of activities. He became a director of British South American Airways (BSAA), and designed and built both cars (Fairthorpes) and light aircraft.

He was dismissed from BSAA on 10 February 1948 after a disagreement with the board, and started his own airline, Airflight, based at Langley Airfield, Berkshire, which was also BSAA's base. The company operated two Avro Tudor airliners, mainly used for carrying fuel during the Berlin Airlift. One of his darkest hours after the war came on 12 March 1950, when one of his aircraft, operating a charter flight, crashed at Llandow in Wales, killing 80 of its 83 occupants.

Bennett became one of the shortest-serving Members of Parliament (MPs) of the 20th century when he was elected at a by-election in 1945 as Liberal MP for Middlesbrough West. He was defeated soon afterwards in the 1945 general election – his parliamentary career having lasted all of 73 days. He had previously attempted to be selected as a Conservative candidate for Macclesfield in February 1944. One of his fellow candidates was Guy Gibson; Gibson was selected instead.

Attempts to return to the House of Commons for Croydon North at a by-election in 1948 and in Norwich North at the 1950 general election were unsuccessful. A later attempt at the 1967 Nuneaton by-election, standing for the obscure National Party, resulted in his losing his deposit. He continued his support for far-right fringe parties during the 1970s as a patron of the National Independence Party. At the February 1974 general election, he stood against the incumbent Conservative prime minister Ted Heath in Sidcup, under the banner "Anti-EEC" (in opposition to Britain's membership of the European Economic Community). He came last, winning just 1.5% of the vote.

In 1958, an autobiography entitled Pathfinder, detailing his experiences throughout the war, was published by Frederick Muller Ltd.

After the closure of Blackbushe Airport in 1960 by the Ministry of Civil Aviation, Bennett purchased three-quarters of the Aerodrome from the Calthorpe Estate and set about reopening the airport as a general aviation facility. He was successful and Blackbushe reopened on 6 October 1962. Bennett fought a planning battle with local councils to develop Blackbushe with new hangar facilities. At the time he faced a lot of opposition from local residents, councils, and the ministry. Ultimately many of the efforts to establish modern facilities at Blackbushe were unsuccessful, and he subsequently sold the airport to Doug Arnold.

Bennett died at the age of 76 on Battle of Britain Day, 15 September 1986.

== See also ==
- List of United Kingdom MPs with the shortest service

Military offices
New title Force established	Officer Commanding Pathfinder Force; 1942–1943	Succeeded by Himself as AOC No. 8 Group
Vacant Group re-established	Air Officer Commanding No. 8 (Pathfinder Force) Group; 1943–1945	Succeeded by John Whitley
Parliament of the United Kingdom
Preceded by Harcourt Johnstone	Member of Parliament for Middlesbrough West; 1945	Succeeded by Geoffrey Cooper
