= Motherwell South =

UK Parliament constituency (1983–1997)

- Former burgh constituency for the House of Commons

1983–1997
- Seats: One
- Created from: Motherwell and Wishaw and Lanark
- Replaced by: Motherwell and Wishaw

Motherwell South was a burgh constituency represented in the House of Commons of the Parliament of the United Kingdom from 1983 to 1997. It was formed by the division of Motherwell and Wishaw and was later merged into a new creation of the constituency.

== Boundaries ==
The Motherwell District electoral divisions of Clydevale, Dalziel, and Wishaw.

== Members of Parliament ==
Election	Member	Party
1983	Jeremy Bray	Labour
1997	constituency abolished	

== Election results ==
=== Elections of the 1980s ===
General election 1983: Motherwell South
Party	Candidate	Votes	%	±%
Labour	Jeremy Bray	19,939	52.4	−4.7
Conservative	Paul Walker	7,590	20.0	−8.8
SDP	Brian Ashley	6,754	17.8	New
SNP	James Wright	3,743	9.8	−2.4
Majority		12,349	32.4	−4.1
Turnout		38,026	72.9	
Labour win (new seat)				

General election 1987: Motherwell South
Party	Candidate	Votes	%	±%
Labour	Jeremy Bray	22,957	58.3	+5.9
SNP	James Wright	6,027	15.3	+5.5
Conservative	John Bercow	5,702	14.5	−5.5
SDP	Ross MacGregor	4,463	11.3	−6.5
Communist	Robert Somerville	223	0.6	New
Majority		16,930	43.0	+10.6
Turnout		39,372	75.5	+2.6
Labour hold		Swing		

=== Elections of the 1990s ===
General election 1992: Motherwell South
Party	Candidate	Votes	%	±%
Labour	Jeremy Bray	21,771	57.1	−1.2
SNP	Kay Ullrich	7,758	20.3	+5.0
Conservative	Gordon McIntosh	6,097	16.0	+1.5
Liberal Democrats	Alexander Mackie	2,349	6.2	−5.1
Ind. Socialist	David Lettice	146	0.4	New
Majority		14,013	36.8	−6.2
Turnout		38,121	76.1	+0.6
Labour hold		Swing	−3.1	
