= Jack Simon, Baron Simon of Glaisdale =

Law Lord in the United Kingdom, politician and judge (1911–2006)

The Right Honourable The Lord Simon of Glaisdale PC DL
- Simon in 1952, by Elliott & Fry

Member of the House of Lords
- Lord Temporal
- Life peerage 5 February 1971 – 7 May 2006

Lord of Appeal in Ordinary
- In office 19 April 1971 – 1977

President of the Probate, Divorce and Admiralty Division
- In office 8 February 1962 – 19 April 1971
- Preceded by: The Lord Merriman
- Succeeded by: Sir George Baker

Solicitor General for England and Wales
- In office 22 October 1959 – 8 February 1962
- Prime Minister: Harold Macmillan
- Preceded by: Sir Harry Hylton-Foster
- Succeeded by: Sir John Hobson

Financial Secretary to the Treasury
- In office 15 January 1958 – 22 October 1959
- Prime Minister: Harold Macmillan
- Chancellor: Derick Heathcoat-Amory
- Preceded by: Enoch Powell
- Succeeded by: Edward Boyle

Member of Parliament for Middlesbrough West
- In office 25 October 1951 – 28 February 1962
- Preceded by: Geoffrey Cooper
- Succeeded by: Jeremy Bray

Personal details
- Born: 15 January 1911 Hampstead, London, England
- Died: 7 May 2006 (aged 95) Chelsea, London, England
- Party: Conservative
- Spouses: Gwendolen Evans (m. 1934; died 1937) Fay Pearson (m. 1948)
- Children: 3, including Peregrine
- Education: Trinity Hall, Cambridge

Military service
- Branch/service: British Army
- Rank: Lieutenant colonel
- Unit: Royal Tank Regiment; 36th Division
- Battles/wars: Second World War: Battle of Madagascar
- Awards: Mentioned in dispatches

Jocelyn Edward Salis Simon, Baron Simon of Glaisdale, PC, DL (15 January 1911 – 7 May 2006) was a Law Lord in the United Kingdom, having been, by turns, a barrister, a commissioned officer in the British Army, a barrister again, a Conservative Party politician, a government minister, and a judge.

He held three ministerial positions in the government of Harold Macmillan, during his 11-year tenure as a member of the House of Commons. He also served as President of the Probate, Divorce and Admiralty Division (now the Family Division) of High Court for nine years, and was a Law Lord for 6 years before his retirement in 1977.

Simon's appointment, as of 2025, marks the last appointment of a former member of the House of Commons as a Lord of Appeal in Ordinary (although Reginald Manningham-Buller, 1st Viscount Dilhorne, appointed before Simon but retiring after Simon, was the last serving law lord to have previously served in the Commons.) As noted by The Independent in his obituary, "Jack Simon was the last of a breed of judges who first pursued a successful career in politics before promotion to the Bench."

== Early life ==
Simon was born in Hampstead in London, the son of Claire and Frank Cecil Simon. His father was a stockbroker. He was educated at Gresham's School, in Holt, Norfolk and read English at Trinity Hall, Cambridge. He was elected an Honorary Fellow of Trinity Hall in 1963. He was called to the bar at Middle Temple in 1934, and joined the chambers of Tom Denning (later Lord Denning MR), practising mainly in family law and trust law.

In the Second World War, he joined the Inns of Court Regiment and was commissioned as an officer in the Royal Tank Regiment. He commanded a special service squadron of three Valentine tanks of the Royal Armoured Corps in the invasion of Madagascar in 1942 and the subsequent six-month campaign to liberate it from Vichy French control. He was taken prisoner by the French army but released by British forces after only a day as a PoW. He used to say he had his best meal of the war as an honoured guest of the French Officers Mess. He later fought with the 36th Division in Burma. He was mentioned in dispatches, and ended the war as a lieutenant colonel.

He returned to legal practice in 1946, and was appointed King's Counsel in 1951.

== Political career ==
Simon's career then took a political turn: at the 1951 general election which returned Winston Churchill to office, he was elected as Conservative Member of Parliament (MP) for Middlesbrough West, winning the seat from Labour. He held the seat for 11 years.

Despite continuing his legal practice, he was attentive to constituency matters, and increased his majority in the 1955 general election. Politically, he was a founder of the One Nation Group. He was Parliamentary Private Secretary to the Attorney-General, Sir Lionel Heald, for three years, and then held three ministerial positions. He was appointed as a Parliamentary Under-Secretary of State at the Home Office in 1957. He took charge of the bill that became the Homicide Act 1957, earning the respect of Rab Butler, then Home Secretary.

A year later, the ministerial team at the Treasury resigned en masse; Derick Heathcoat-Amory became the new Chancellor of the Exchequer, replacing Peter Thorneycroft and Simon was promoted to become Financial Secretary to the Treasury, replacing Enoch Powell. Simon held this second office for only one year, being appointed Solicitor-General in 1959 to replace Sir Harry Hylton-Foster on his election as Speaker of the House of Commons; meanwhile, Sir Reginald Manningham-Buller was Attorney General. Simon was rewarded on taking this third office with a knighthood, and became a Privy Councillor in 1961.

== Judicial career ==
Simon seemed destined for a seat in the Cabinet. However, after three years as Solicitor-General, he resigned from his office and his seat in Parliament in 1962, to widespread surprise, to become a High Court judge, and President of the Probate, Divorce and Admiralty Division, replacing Lord Merriman. His legal practice at the family bar had prepared him for this position perfectly. The year after taking office, he had an operation to remove a benign tumour. The operation left him paralysed on one side of his face: he had a speech impediment and also lost the use of his right eye; he habitually wore a black eye-patch thereafter, which gave him somewhat of a piratical air.

He remained President of the Probate, Divorce and Admiralty Division for nine years, until he was created a Life peer as Baron Simon of Glaisdale, of Glaisdale in the North Riding of the County of York on 5 February 1971 and appointed a Lord of Appeal in Ordinary. He retired from judicial office in 1977, but continued to attend the House of Lords and took a close interest in legislation.

He sat as a crossbencher in the House of Lords, despite earlier sitting in the House of Commons and holding ministerial office as a Conservative. He was strongly opposed to Henry VIII clauses. He proposed a bill in 1981 to reform the spelling of British English by adopting certain practices from American English, such as replacing "-ours" endings with "-ors".

At the time of his death in 2006, he was the last living person to have held the title of a KC, having been appointed in 1951 under the reign of George VI. However, he used the suffix QC between 1952 and 1962.

== Lord-Lieutenancy ==
He was appointed as a deputy lieutenant for North Yorkshire in 1973.

== Personal life and death ==
Simon married his first wife, actress Gwendolen Evans, in 1934. She died from tuberculosis in 1937. He married his second wife, Fay, in 1948; they had three sons. One, Sir Peregrine Simon, also became a barrister and Appeal Court judge.

Simon was raised in a Unitarian family of Jewish origin, but he later joined the Church of England.

On 7 May 2006, Simon died at Chelsea and Westminster Hospital, at the age of 95.

== Arms ==
Coat of arms of Jack Simon, Baron Simon of Glaisdale
Crest A cock's head erased Azure combed and wattled Gules between two palm branches Vert holding in the beak two roses Argent clipped leaved barbed and seeded Proper. Escutcheon Per saltire Sable and Ermine a pair of scales Or between in fess two roses Argent barbed and seeded Proper and in pale two crescents Ermine. Supporters Dexter a man habited in the robes of a Doctor of Civil Law in the University of Cambridge Proper and holding in his dexter hand a book Or sinister a man habited in the robes of the President of the Probate Divorce and Admiralty Division of the High Court Proper. Motto Si Monent Tubae Paratus

== Sources ==
- Obituary (The Guardian, 8 May 2006)
- Obituary (The Daily Telegraph, 8 May 2006)
- Obituary (The Times, 8 May 2006)
- Obituary (The Independent, 9 May 2006)

Parliament of the United Kingdom
Preceded by Geoffrey Cooper	Member of Parliament for Middlesbrough West; 1951–1962	Succeeded by Jeremy Bray
Political offices
Preceded by Enoch Powell	Financial Secretary to the Treasury; 1958–1959	Succeeded by Edward Boyle
Legal offices
Preceded by Harry Hylton-Foster	Solicitor General for England and Wales; 1959–1962	Succeeded by John Hobson
Preceded by The Lord Merriman	President of the Probate, Divorce and Admiralty Division; 1962–1971	Succeeded by Sir George Baker
