= John Sutcliffe (British politician) =

British politician

John Sutcliffe CBE

Member of Parliament for Middlesbrough West
- In office 18 June 1970 – 28 February 1974
- Preceded by: Jeremy Bray
- Succeeded by: Ian Wrigglesworth

Personal details
- Born: 30 April 1931 (age 95)
- Party: Conservative
- Parent: Harold Sutcliffe (father)
- Education: New College, Oxford

John Harold Vick Sutcliffe CBE (born 30 April 1931) is a former British Conservative Party politician.

== Early life ==
Sutcliffe's father was Sir Harold Sutcliffe, Member of Parliament (MP) for Royton (1931–1950) and Heywood and Royton (1950–1955). He was educated at Winchester College and New College, Oxford. He was called to the Bar, member of Inner Temple, in 1956.

John was the third child of Sir Harold Sutcliffe. His siblings were Anne Theodora (born 1928), Betty (born 1929), and younger sister Jennifer Mary (born 1933). His mother was Emily Theodora Cochrane (known as Theo.) His parents divorced in 1947, and his father (badly gassed in World War I) died in 1958.

== Political career ==
Sutcliffe contested Oldham West in 1959, Chorley, Lancashire, in 1964 and Middlesbrough West in 1966.

He was Member of Parliament (MP) for Middlesbrough West from 1970 to 1974 narrowly winning the seat by some 380 votes from Jeremy Bray. After boundary changes, he stood as candidate in the notional Labour Thornaby in both February and October 1974, but lost to Labour candidate Ian Wrigglesworth.

== Later life ==
A company director, he served on North Housing Association 1977–94 Chairman from 1986, Board of Housing Corporation 1982–88, Board of Teesside Development Corporation 1987–1998, Director then Chairman N.E.Civic Trust 1976–88, Chairman of the Northern Heritage Trust 1981–88 and member of the North York Moors National Park committee 1982–88.

In 1994 he was appointed CBE for his services to housing and conservation. High Sheriff of North Yorkshire 1987–1988, Deputy Lieutenant North Yorkshire.

Parliament of the United Kingdom
Preceded by Jeremy Bray	Member of Parliament for Middlesbrough West; 1970–Feb 1974	Constituency abolished
