= Adrian Slade =

British politician (1936–2025)

Adrian Slade CBE
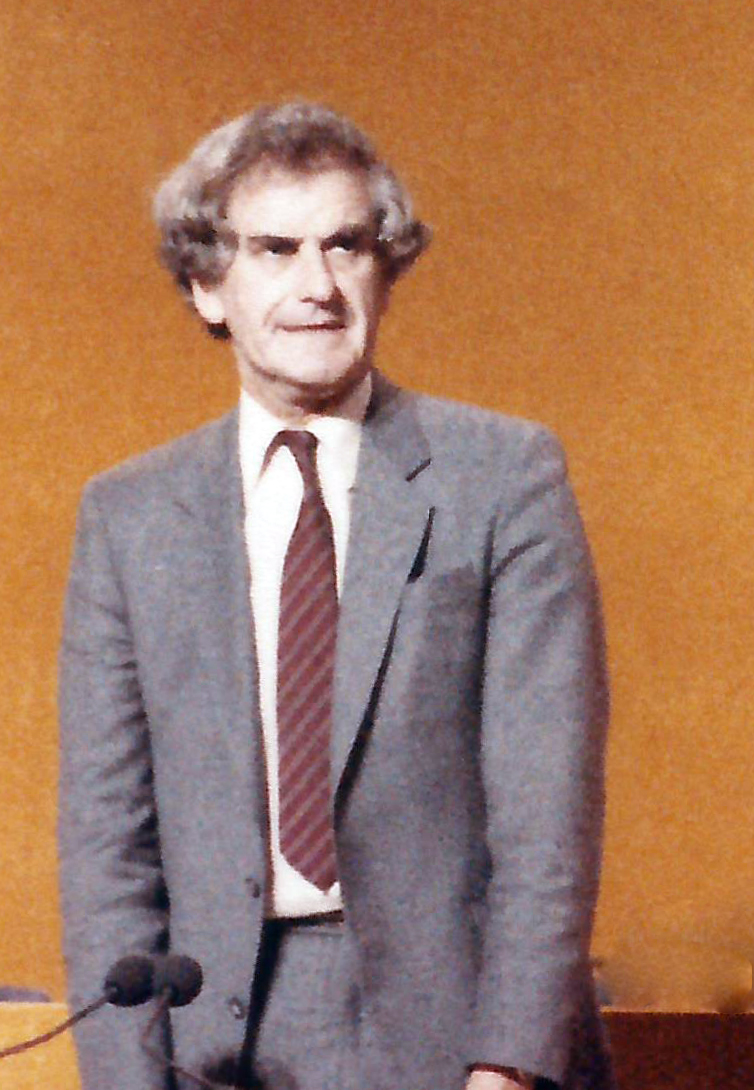
- Slade in 1987

President of the Liberal Party
- In office 1987 – 2 March 1988
- Preceded by: Des Wilson
- Succeeded by: Ian Wrigglesworth; President of the Liberal Democrats

Member of the Greater London Council for Richmond
- In office 7 May 1981 – 31 March 1986
- Preceded by: Edward Leigh
- Succeeded by: seat abolished
- Majority: 815 (0.4%)

Personal details
- Born: 25 May 1936
- Died: 24 January 2025 (aged 88)
- Party: Liberal Party; Liberal Democrats
- Education: Trinity College, Cambridge

Adrian Carnegie Slade CBE (25 May 1936 – 24 January 2025) was a British Liberal and Liberal Democrat politician and advertising agency founder.

== Life and career ==
Born in 1936 to George Penkivil Slade KC (a kinsman of Sir Benjamin Slade), he was educated at Eton College before going up to Trinity College, Cambridge. At Cambridge, he became President of the Footlights, and famously recruited Peter Cook.

Slade was a Liberal Party parliamentary candidate in the 1960s and 1970s, contesting Putney in 1966, February 1974 and October 1974. He stood as an SDP–Liberal Alliance candidate for Wimbledon in 1987. He scored an upset electoral victory in the 1981 elections to the Greater London Council (GLC), winning the Richmond seat from the Conservative Edward Leigh by just 115 votes. He became Leader of the SDP–Liberal Alliance group on the GLC, and remained so until the GLC's dissolution in 1986.

He was the last President of the Liberal Party, from 1987 to 1988, conducting its merger negotiations with the SDP, Slade then served as a Vice-President of the Liberal Democrats (1988–89).

Slade was also known within Liberal Party circles as a pianist and singer, talents which he shared with his brother Julian Slade. His eldest brother, Sir Christopher Slade, was a Lord Justice of Appeal (1982–91) and his sister was Pauline Hamilton-Russell.

Slade had two children, Nicola and Rupert, with his wife Sue (née Forsyth). He died on 24 January 2025, at the age of 88.

Party political offices
Preceded by Des Wilson	President of the Liberal Party; 1987–1988	Succeeded by Ian Wrigglesworth; President of the Liberal Democrats
