= Jeremy Bray =

British politician (1930–2002)

- Bray in 1967

Member of Parliament for Motherwell South (Motherwell and Wishaw 1974–1983)
- In office 10 October 1974 – 8 April 1997
- Preceded by: George Lawson
- Succeeded by: Constituency abolished

Member of Parliament for Middlesbrough West
- In office 6 June 1962 – 29 May 1970
- Preceded by: Jocelyn Simon
- Succeeded by: John Sutcliffe

Personal details
- Born: Jeremy William Bray; 29 June 1930 British Hong Kong
- Died: 31 May 2002 (aged 71) Linton, Cambridgeshire, England
- Party: Labour
- Spouse: Elizabeth Trowell (m. 1953)
- Education: Eastnor Village School; Aberystwyth Grammar School; Kingswood School
- Alma mater: Jesus College, Cambridge; Harvard University

Jeremy William Bray (29 June 1930 – 31 May 2002) was a British Labour politician and a Member of Parliament for 31 years.

== Early life and education ==
Bray was born in British Hong Kong, the son of Reverend Arthur Bray, a Methodist missionary. He spent his formative years in Foshan, until he and his family were evacuated by gunboat prior to the arrival of the Japanese army in 1941. Returning to Britain, he attended Eastnor Village School, Aberystwyth Grammar School, Kingswood School, Bath (1942–48) and Jesus College, Cambridge, where he graduated as a Wrangler in 1953. Staying on at Cambridge to conduct doctoral research in pure mathematics under the supervision of J. E. Littlewood, he spent a year abroad as a Choate Fellow at Harvard University in 1955–56.

== Career ==
Bray's first job upon leaving Cambridge was as a technical officer at the Imperial Chemical Industries works in Wilton, Teesside, where he advised his superiors to invest in the purchase of the plant's first computer. In the 1970s his interests turned more firmly towards statistics and econometrics, and from 1971 to 1974 he was the co-director of a research programme on econometric methods at Queen Mary College and Imperial College, London. He also spent some time working as a research officer at the Department of Applied Economics at the University of Cambridge, collaborating with the future Nobel Laureate Professor Sir Richard Stone and Terry Barker on the Cambridge Growth Project.

== Political career ==
Bray unsuccessfully contested Thirsk and Malton for Labour in 1959. He was first elected as MP for Middlesbrough West in a 1962 by-election. During Harold Wilson's second term in office Bray was parliamentary secretary at the Ministry of Power (1966–67) and Ministry of Technology (1967–69), serving under Richard Marsh and Tony Benn respectively. Middlesbrough West remained a highly marginal seat, however, and he was defeated in his attempt to be re-elected as an MP at the 1970 general election.

Following a four-year hiatus, Bray was then returned as MP for Motherwell and Wishaw from October 1974 to 1983, and for Motherwell South from 1983 until his retirement in 1997. Chosen by the Motherwell Labour Party as their candidate because of his steel industry expertise, during this second spell in parliament Bray was noted for his unflagging efforts to save the Ravenscraig steelworks from closure. He was the Opposition Spokesman on Science and Technology from 1983 to 1992.

== Personal life ==
Bray married his wife Elizabeth in 1953 and had four daughters. A Methodist lay preacher, he was deputy chairman of Christian Aid from 1972 to 1984. His elder brother, Denis Bray, was a senior civil servant in colonial-era Hong Kong.

Bray underwent major heart surgery in 1991, and afterwards was in increasingly poor health. He died of heart failure at his home in Linton, Cambridgeshire, on 31 May 2002. His autobiography, Standing on the Shoulders of Giants, was published posthumously by his wife in 2004.

== Notes ==
Parliament of the United Kingdom
Preceded by Jocelyn Simon	Member of Parliament for Middlesbrough West; 1962–1970	Succeeded by John Sutcliffe
Preceded by George Lawson	Member of Parliament for Motherwell and Wishaw; Oct 1974–1983	Constituency abolished
New constituency	Member of Parliament for Motherwell South; 1983–1997	Constituency abolished
Party political offices
Preceded by Thomas Balogh	Chairman of the Fabian Society; 1970 – 1971	Succeeded by Peter Hall
