= Mallaby-Deeley baronets =

Extinct baronetcy in the Baronetage of the United Kingdom

The Mallaby-Deeley Baronetcy, of Mitcham Court in the Parish of Mitcham and County of Surrey, was a title in the Baronetage of the United Kingdom. It was created on 28 June 1922 for the Conservative politician Harry Mallaby-Deeley. Born Harry Deeley, he assumed the same year by deed poll the additional surname of Mallaby, which was that of his maternal grandfather. The title became extinct on the death of the third Baronet in 1962.

The actor Frank Curzon was the brother of the first Baronet.

== Mallaby-Deeley baronets, of Mitcham Court (1922) ==
- Sir Harry Mallaby Mallaby-Deeley, 1st Baronet (1863–1937)
- Sir Guy Meyrick Mallaby Mallaby-Deeley, 2nd Baronet (1897–1946)
- Sir Anthony Meyrick Mallaby-Deeley, 3rd Baronet (1923–1962)

Coat of arms of Mallaby-Deeley of Mitcham Court
Crest 1st, A sinister cubit arm in armour, gauntleted holding in the hand a dagger, point downwards Proper, pommel and hilt Or, between two spurs Gold (Deeley); 2nd, Issuant from clouds Proper, a fleur-de-lis Azure Escutcheon Quarterly, 1st and 2nd: Sable, a chevron engrailed Ermine between in chief two fleur-de-lis, and in base a crescent Or (Deeley); 2nd and 3rd: Or, a bunch of nettles Proper and a chief Sable. Motto Quod Deus vult
