= 1923 Willesden East by-election =

UK parliamentary by-election

← 1922	3 March 1923	1923 →

Candidate	Johnstone	Stanley
Party	Liberal	Unionist
Popular vote	14,824	9,648
Percentage	60.6%	39.4%
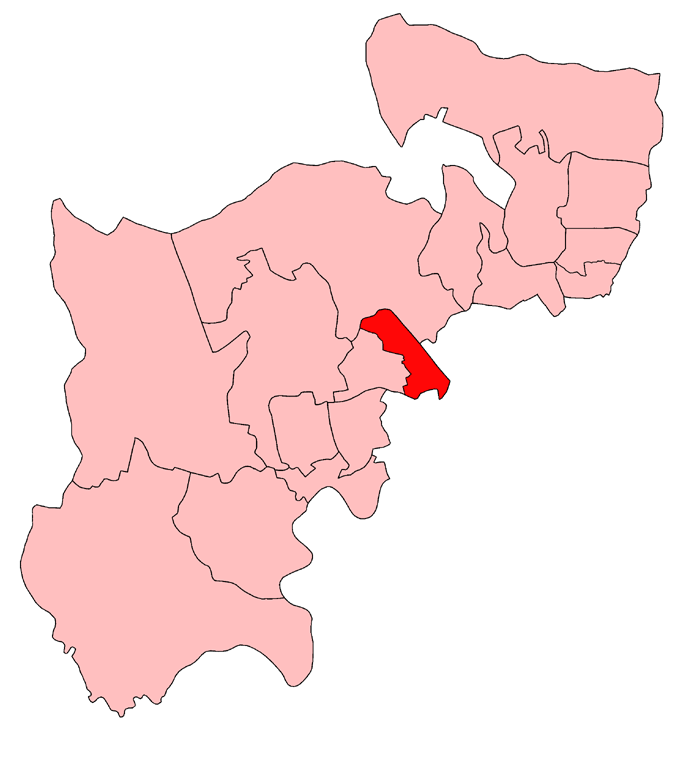
MP before election
Mallaby-Deeley
Unionist
Subsequent MP
Johnstone
Liberal

The 1923 Willesden East by-election was a parliamentary by-election for the British House of Commons constituency of Willesden East held on 3 March 1923. The constituency was a large one extending from Kilburn in the south to the Welsh Harp and on to Neasden.

== Vacancy ==
The by-election was caused by the resignation of the sitting Unionist MP, Sir Harry Mallaby-Deeley. Mallaby-Deeley had been MP for Willesden East since the 1918 general election. Despite the protestations of ill-health which Mallaby-Deeley cited to justify his standing down from Parliament, he lived for another 14 years during which he carried on a substantial business career. The strong likelihood is that Mallaby-Deeley was asked to stand aside and cause a by-election as a route back into Parliament for the Hon. G.F.Stanley,

== Electoral history ==
At the previous General Election, the constituency had become a Unionist/Liberal marginal;

Mallaby-Deeley

General election 1922: Willesden East
Party	Candidate	Votes	%	±%
Unionist	Harry Mallaby-Deeley	12,525	52.8	−8.2
Liberal	Harcourt Johnstone	11,211	47.2	+33.2
Majority		1,314	5.6	−31.4
Turnout		23,736	58.4	+7.5
Unionist hold		Swing	-20.7	

== Candidates ==
- The Unionist candidate was Hon. George Stanley, the sixth son of the Earl of Derby. Stanley had been a soldier serving in the Second Boer War and during the Great War. He had been Unionist MP for Preston from 1910 to 1922. Although out of Parliament, Stanley was still a government minister being Under-Secretary of State for the Home Department.
- The Liberals re-selected Harcourt Johnstone, 27-year-old son of a British diplomat who had also served in the War and who had fought Willesden East at the 1922 general election losing by 1,314 votes to Mallaby-Deeley.
- There had been a Labour candidate at the 1918 general election but the party had not fought in 1922. It was reported however that Labour was seriously considering putting up a candidate for the by-election and the name of Alfred Smith, the President of the Licensed Vehicle Workers Association and a previous Labour candidate at Dorset East and at West Leyton was mentioned. Smith later gained election to the House of Commons as Labour MP for Sunderland in 1929. In the end Labour decided not to contest the election.
- At one point it seemed possible that a candidate standing under the Anti-Waste banner would be nominated. A few days before close of nominations, posters bearing the name of W. Lennard appeared in the constituency as an Anti-Waste and Independent Unionist. The bills warned the electorate that the issue was Anti-Waste or bankruptcy. Lennard indicated that he would announce on 20 February if he intended to stand but despite the appearance of the posters and the decision of the Anti-Waste League to put up candidates at a number of by-elections during this time, most notably James Erskine's victory at the by-election at Westminster St George's on 7 June 1921, Lennard was not nominated in Willesden East and the contest was therefore a straight fight between Stanley and Johnstone.

== Campaign ==
Controversially in a constituency where over six thousand electors were thought to be Jewish, polling day was fixed for a Saturday. Housing was featuring strongly as an issue of importance at this time. In the by-election at Mitcham being held on the same day as Willesden East, the Unionist candidate was Sir Arthur Griffith-Boscawen. Griffth-Boscawen had lost his seat at Taunton at the general election of November 1922 but accepted Bonar Law’s offer to remain in the government as Minister of Health while he tried to find a seat to get back into Parliament. His main task as minister was to produce a Bill on local government rating but this proved highly controversial and the issue was a magnet for a whole range of problems associated with housing, including the failure of the government to increase the number of houses being built, to be raised at Mitcham and elsewhere, including to Johnstone’s advantage at Willesden. It was reported that the loss of the by-election would represent a blow for the Unionist government, although it was too early after the general election to see the results as a definitive verdict on Bonar Law’s administration.

== Result ==
The result was a gain for the Liberal Party from the Unionists with Johnstone gaining 60% of the poll and a majority of 5,176 over Stanley.

Willesden East by-election, 1923
Party	Candidate	Votes	%	±%
Liberal	Harcourt Johnstone	14,824	60.6	+13.4
Unionist	George Frederick Stanley	9,648	39.4	−13.4
Majority		5,176	21.2	N/A
Turnout		24,472	60.2	+1.8
Liberal gain from Unionist		Swing	+13.4	

The Liberal victory was described by Austen Chamberlain as a “smash” and a bad omen for the by-election at Mitcham being held on the same day, which the Unionists also lost, this time to Labour. Clearly the absence of a Labour candidate at Willesden meant the Liberals were able to present Johnstone as the only progressive and anti-Tory candidate. This tactical advantage was underscored by an unproved allegation against Stanley that he or his supporters had tried to bribe a Labour man into standing as a candidate for the purpose of splitting the Liberal vote.

The loss of Willesden by such a large majority was unexpected

== Aftermath ==
It was hard to discern Willesden as part of any pattern of political success for the Liberal Party. Cook and Ramsden in their survey of British by-elections comment that none of the by-elections in the 1922-1923 Parliament pointed to the outcome of Stanley Baldwin’s Tariff reform general election of 6 December 1923. At that election, Johnstone narrowly held the seat despite the intervention of a Labour Party candidate.

General election 6 December 1923: Willesden East
Party	Candidate	Votes	%	±%
Liberal	Harcourt Johnstone	11,260	40.5	−6.7
Unionist	George Frederick Stanley	11,146	40.1	−12.7
Labour	Joseph George Butler	5,392	19.4	New
Majority		114	0.4	−5.2
Turnout		27,798	68.1	+9.7
Liberal hold		Swing		

== See also ==
- List of United Kingdom by-elections
- United Kingdom by-election records
