= Terry Barker =

British academic

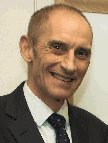
- Occupation: Academic

Terry Barker is a British economist and former Director of the Cambridge Centre for Climate Change Mitigation Research (4CMR) part of the Department of Land Economy, University of Cambridge. He is also a member of the Tyndall Centre, the Chairman of Cambridge Econometrics (a company he co-founded in 1985), and chairman of the Cambridge Trust for New Thinking in Economics, which is a charitable organisation with a mission to promote new approaches to solving economic problems.

== Career ==
After obtaining his degree in Edinburgh University, Barker worked as a research officer at the Department of Applied Economics, University of Cambridge, with Professor Sir Richard Stone, the Nobel Laureate in economics. The main research undertaken during this period was the Cambridge Growth Project, a project to develop computer software to construct a computational model of the British Economy. The project, initially directed by Richard Stone, whom Barker succeeded as director in 1983, coordinated a research team including economists such as Mervyn King, Angus Stewart Deaton and Jeremy Bray. In 1985 Barker co-founded Cambridge Econometrics.

Barker has overseen a continuation of the research into the application of computing to econometric modelling, in particular the theory and application of large-scale economy-energy-environment (E3) models. Using such E3 models, he has been able to apply empirical analysis to international trade theory and to policies for the mitigation of greenhouse gases. He has also held various positions, including Coordinating Lead Author (CLA), under the Intergovernmental Panel on Climate Change, an organisation that won (jointly with Al Gore) the Nobel Peace Prize for 2007. In 2009 he presented a speech to COP 15 – the UNFCCC Conference of Parties event in Copenhagen.

== Views ==
Barker has stated that the climate change problem requires urgent action aimed at decarbonising the world economy and has written extensively on these issues. He has been supportive of Barack Obama's Green New Deal, stating that "If all G-20 countries adopted a 'Green New Deal' similar to the one proposed by President Obama, the world economy would be greatly strengthened, especially the sectors producing low-carbon technologies ... Where many current calculations get it wrong is in the assumption that more stringent [climate mitigation] measures will necessarily raise the overall cost, especially when there is substantial unemployment and underuse of capacity as there is today." He has expressed the view that tougher restrictions for greenhouse gas emissions may, if done properly, actually have a positive macroeconomic effect: "There is some evidence that harder greenhouse-gas targets and regulation may actually increase benefits through improved innovation and distribution of low-carbon technologies, and increased revenues from taxes or permits. These revenues can be spent to further support new technology and to lower other indirect taxes, ensuring the fiscal neutrality of these measures."

== Selected recent articles ==
- Barker, T. and Scrieciu S. (2009) "Unilateral climate change mitigation, carbon leakage and competitiveness: an application to the European Union", International Journal of Global Warming, 1(4): 405-417
- Barker, T., Ekins, P., Junankar, S., Pollitt, H. and Summerton, P. (2009) "The competitiveness effects of European environmental fiscal reforms", European Review of Energy Markets 3(1):
- Barker, T., Dagoumas, A. and Rubin, J. (2009) "The macroeconomic rebound effect and the world economy", Energy Efficiency 2(4): 411-427
- Barker, T. (2009) "Endogenous money in 21st Century Keynesian economics", in Arestis, P and Sawyer, M. (eds) 21st Century Keynesian Economics, Palgrave Macmillan ISBN 9780230236011
- Barker, T., Junankar, S., Pollitt, H. and Summerton, P. (2009) "The effects of Environmental Tax Reform on international competitiveness in the European Union: modelling with E3ME", in Andersen, M. S. and Ekins, P. (eds) Carbon-Energy Taxation: Lessons from Europe, Oxford University Press
- Barker, T., Junankar, S., Pollitt, H. and Summerton, P. (2009) "Carbon leakage from unilateral environmental tax reforms in Europe, 1995–2005", in Andersen, M. S. and Ekins, P. (eds) Carbon-Energy Taxation: Lessons from Europe, Oxford University Press
- Barker, T. (2009) "Will the reconstruction of the global economy be positive for mitigating climate change?" in Giddens, A., Latham, S. and Liddle, R. (eds) Building a low carbon future: the politics of climate change
- Barker, T., Junankar, S., Pollitt, H. and Summerton, P. (2009) "The macroeconomic effects of unilateral environmental tax reforms in Europe, 1995–2012", in Innovation, Technology and Employment: Impacts of Environmental Fiscal Reforms and Other Market-Based Instruments, edited volume "Critical Issues in Environmental Taxation VOL VI", Oxford University Press

== Selected books ==
- Barker, T. and Köhler, J. (1998) International Competitiveness and Environmental Policies, London: Edward Elgar
- Barker, T. (1996) Space-Time Economics, Cambridge: Cambridge Econometrics.
- Barker, T., Ekins, P. and Johnstone, N. (1995) Global Warming and Energy Demand, London: Routledge.
- Barker, T. (1991) Green Futures for Economic Growth, Cambridge: Cambridge Econometrics
- Barker, T. and Pesaran, M. H. (1990) Disaggregation in Economic Modelling, London: Routledge.
- Barker, T. and Peterson, W. (1987) The Cambridge Multisectoral Dynamic Model of the British Economy, Cambridge: Cambridge University Press.
- Barker, T. (1970) The Determinants of Britain's Visible Imports, 1949 – 1966, London: Chapman and Hall.
