= Middlesbrough West =

Parliamentary constituency in the United Kingdom, 1918–1974

- Former borough constituency for the House of Commons
- County: North Riding of Yorkshire

1918–1974
- Seats: One
- Created from: Middlesbrough
- Replaced by: Thornaby, Middlesbrough

Middlesbrough West was a parliamentary constituency in the town of Middlesbrough in North East England. It returned one Member of Parliament (MP) to the House of Commons of the Parliament of the United Kingdom, elected by the first-past-the-post voting system.

The constituency was created for the 1918 general election, and abolished for the February 1974 general election.

== Boundaries ==
1918–1950: The County Borough of Middlesbrough wards of Acklam, Ayresome, Cannon, Cleveland, Linthorpe, and Newport.

1950–1964: The County Borough of Middlesbrough wards of Acklam, Ayresome, and Linthorpe, and the Borough of Thornaby-on-Tees.

1964–1974: The County Borough of Middlesbrough wards of Acklam, Ayresome, Crescent, Gresham, Linthorpe, Park, and Whinney Banks, and the Borough of Thornaby-on-Tees.

== Members of Parliament ==
| Year | Member | Party |
|---|---|---|
| 1918 | Trevelyan Thomson | Liberal |
| 1928 | F. Kingsley Griffith | Liberal |
| 1940 | Harcourt Johnstone | Liberal |
| 1945 | Don Bennett | Liberal |
| 1945 | Geoffrey Cooper | Labour |
| 1951 | Sir Jocelyn Simon | Conservative |
| 1962 | Jeremy Bray | Labour |
| 1970 | John Sutcliffe | Conservative |
| Feb 1974 | constituency abolished | |

== Election results ==
=== Elections in the 1910s ===
General election 1918: Middlesbrough West
| Party | Candidate | Votes | % | ±% |
|---|---|---|---|---|
| Liberal | Trevelyan Thomson * | 10,958 | 67.2 | |
| Labour | Charlie Cramp | 5,350 | 32.8 | |
| Majority | | 5,608 | 34.4 | |
| Turnout | | 16,308 | 50.5 | |
| Registered electors | | 32,286 | | |
| Liberal win (new seat) | | | | |

* Thomson was issued with the Coalition Coupon but rejected it.

=== Elections in the 1920s ===
General election 1922: Middlesbrough West
| Party | Candidate | Votes | % | ±% |
|---|---|---|---|---|
| Liberal | Trevelyan Thomson | 16,811 | 69.4 | +2.2 |
| National Liberal | Harry Driffield Levick | 7,422 | 30.6 | N/A |
| Majority | | 9,389 | 38.8 | +4.4 |
| Turnout | | 24,233 | 68.4 | +17.9 |
| Registered electors | | 35,448 | | |
| Liberal hold | | Swing | +2.2 | |

General election 1923: Middlesbrough West
| Party | Candidate | Votes | % | ±% |
|---|---|---|---|---|
| Liberal | Trevelyan Thomson | 16,837 | 69.4 | 0.0 |
| Labour | J. D. White | 7,443 | 30.6 | New |
| Majority | | 9,424 | 38.8 | 0.0 |
| Turnout | | 24,280 | 68.6 | +0.2 |
| Liberal hold | | Swing | | |

General election 1924: Middlesbrough West
| Party | Candidate | Votes | % | ±% |
|---|---|---|---|---|
| Liberal | Trevelyan Thomson | Unopposed | N/A | N/A |
| Liberal hold | | | | |

1928 Middlesbrough West by-election
| Party | Candidate | Votes | % | ±% |
|---|---|---|---|---|
| Liberal | Frank Griffith | 10,717 | 36.2 | N/A |
| Labour | Alonza Ellis | 10,628 | 36.0 | New |
| Unionist | Stanley Sadler | 8,213 | 27.8 | New |
| Majority | | 89 | 0.2 | N/A |
| Turnout | | 29,558 | 83.2 | N/A |
| Liberal hold | | Swing | N/A | |

General election 1929: Middlesbrough West
| Party | Candidate | Votes | % | ±% |
|---|---|---|---|---|
| Liberal | Frank Griffith | 14,674 | 40.6 | N/A |
| Labour | Alonza Ellis | 13,328 | 36.9 | N/A |
| Unionist | Albert E. Baucher | 8,137 | 22.5 | N/A |
| Majority | | 1,346 | 3.7 | N/A |
| Turnout | | 36,139 | | |
| Liberal hold | | Swing | | |

=== Elections in the 1930s ===
General election 1931: Middlesbrough West
| Party | Candidate | Votes | % | ±% |
|---|---|---|---|---|
| Liberal | Frank Griffith | 26,011 | 66.61 | |
| Labour | Henry Kegie | 13,040 | 33.39 | |
| Majority | | 12,971 | 33.32 | |
| Turnout | | 39,051 | 85.02 | |
| Liberal hold | | Swing | | |

General election 1935: Middlesbrough West
| Party | Candidate | Votes | % | ±% |
|---|---|---|---|---|
| Liberal | Frank Griffith | 13,689 | 36.18 | |
| Labour | Henry Kegie | 12,764 | 33.73 | |
| National Labour | William Arthur Spofforth | 11,387 | 30.09 | N/A |
| Majority | | 925 | 2.45 | |
| Turnout | | 37,840 | 79.39 | |
| Liberal hold | | Swing | | |

=== Elections in the 1940s ===
General Election 1939–40:

A General election was due to take place before the end of 1940, but was postponed due to the Second World War. By 1939, the following candidates had been selected to contest this constituency;

- Liberal: Frank Griffith
- National Labour: Thomas K. Briggs

1940 Middlesbrough West by-election
| Party | Candidate | Votes | % | ±% |
|---|---|---|---|---|
| Liberal | Harcourt Johnstone | Unopposed | N/A | N/A |
| Liberal hold | | | | |

1945 Middlesbrough West by-election
| Party | Candidate | Votes | % | ±% |
|---|---|---|---|---|
| Liberal | Don Bennett | Unopposed | N/A | N/A |
| Liberal hold | | | | |

General election 1945: Middlesbrough West
| Party | Candidate | Votes | % | ±% |
|---|---|---|---|---|
| Labour | Geoffrey Cooper | 20,071 | 53.48 | |
| Liberal | Don Bennett | 17,458 | 46.52 | |
| Majority | | 2,613 | 6.96 | N/A |
| Turnout | | 37,529 | 77.23 | |
| Labour gain from Liberal | | Swing | | |

=== Elections in the 1950s ===
General election 1950: Middlesbrough West
| Party | Candidate | Votes | % | ±% |
|---|---|---|---|---|
| Labour | Geoffrey Cooper | 21,593 | 46.31 | |
| Conservative | L Wright | 17,760 | 38.09 | New |
| Liberal | Philip Fothergill | 7,273 | 15.60 | |
| Majority | | 3,833 | 8.22 | |
| Turnout | | 46,626 | 86.42 | |
| Labour hold | | Swing | | |

General election 1951: Middlesbrough West
| Party | Candidate | Votes | % | ±% |
|---|---|---|---|---|
| Conservative | Jocelyn Simon | 24,622 | 52.22 | |
| Labour Co-op | David Dunwoodie | 22,525 | 47.78 | |
| Majority | | 2,097 | 4.44 | |
| Turnout | | 47,147 | 86.29 | |
| Conservative gain from Labour | | Swing | | |

General election 1955: Middlesbrough West
| Party | Candidate | Votes | % | ±% |
|---|---|---|---|---|
| Conservative | Jocelyn Simon | 25,495 | 58.44 | |
| Labour Co-op | Rita Alison Smythe | 18,134 | 41.56 | |
| Majority | | 7,361 | 16.88 | |
| Turnout | | 43,629 | 82.45 | |
| Conservative hold | | Swing | | |

General election 1959: Middlesbrough West
| Party | Candidate | Votes | % | ±% |
|---|---|---|---|---|
| Conservative | Jocelyn Simon | 24,602 | 54.88 | |
| Labour | Edward Fletcher | 15,892 | 35.45 | |
| Liberal | George Wharton Ian Hodgson | 4,336 | 9.67 | New |
| Majority | | 8,710 | 19.43 | |
| Turnout | | 44,830 | 84.49 | |
| Conservative hold | | Swing | | |

=== Elections in the 1960s ===
1962 Middlesbrough West by-election
| Party | Candidate | Votes | % | ±% |
|---|---|---|---|---|
| Labour | Jeremy Bray | 15,095 | 39.67 | +4.22 |
| Conservative | Bernard Connelly | 12,825 | 33.70 | −21.18 |
| Liberal | George Scott | 9,829 | 25.83 | +16.16 |
| Independent | Russell Ernest Eckley | 189 | 0.50 | New |
| Independent | Malcolm Thompson | 117 | 0.31 | New |
| Majority | | 2,270 | 5.97 | N/A |
| Turnout | | 38,055 | | |
| Labour gain from Conservative | | Swing | | |

General election 1964: Middlesbrough West
| Party | Candidate | Votes | % | ±% |
|---|---|---|---|---|
| Labour | Jeremy Bray | 19,904 | 44.75 | |
| Conservative | Anthony Sumption | 18,759 | 42.17 | |
| Liberal | John Rettie | 5,816 | 13.08 | |
| Majority | | 1,145 | 2.58 | |
| Turnout | | 44,479 | 84.07 | |
| Labour hold | | Swing | | |

General election 1966: Middlesbrough West
| Party | Candidate | Votes | % | ±% |
|---|---|---|---|---|
| Labour | Jeremy Bray | 23,649 | 54.48 | |
| Conservative | John Sutcliffe | 19,756 | 45.52 | |
| Majority | | 3,893 | 8.96 | |
| Turnout | | 43,405 | 81.47 | |
| Labour hold | | Swing | | |

=== Election in the 1970s ===
General election 1970: Middlesbrough West
| Party | Candidate | Votes | % | ±% |
|---|---|---|---|---|
| Conservative | John Sutcliffe | 22,374 | 50.44 | |
| Labour | Jeremy Bray | 21,986 | 49.56 | |
| Majority | | 388 | 0.88 | N/A |
| Turnout | | 44,360 | 75.05 | |
| Conservative gain from Labour | | Swing | | |

== See also ==
- 1940 Middlesbrough West by-election
- 1945 Middlesbrough West by-election
