= Harry Mallaby-Deeley =

British Conservative Party politician

Sir Harry Mallaby-Deeley in 1922

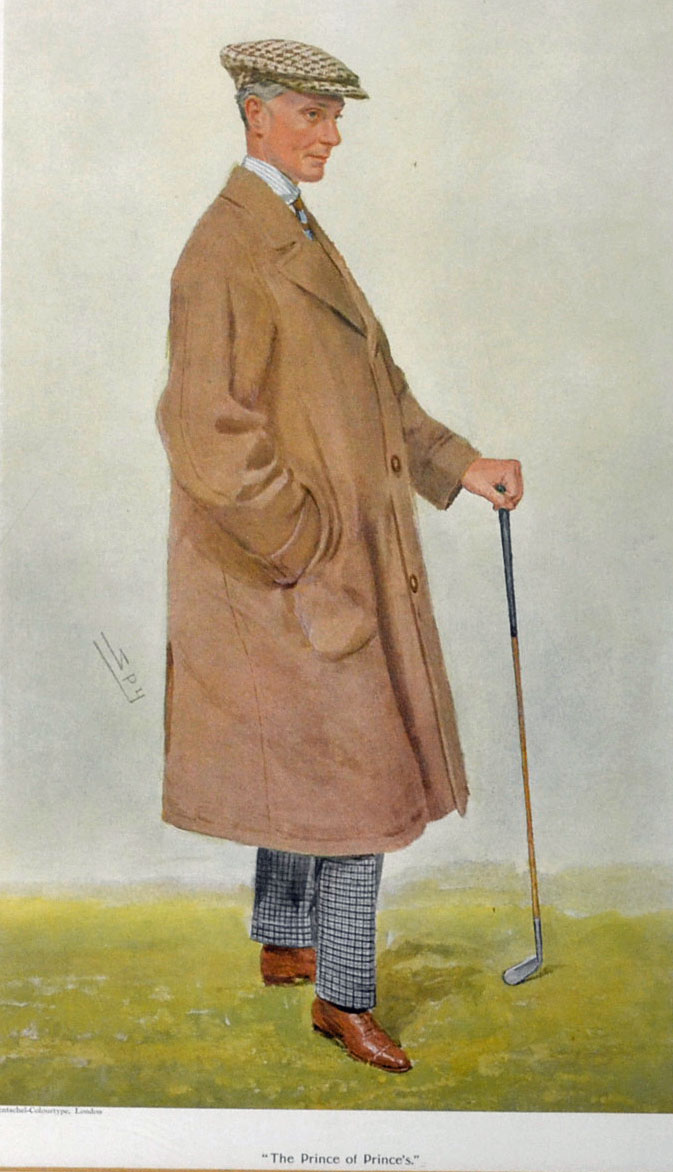
"The Prince of Prince's", caricature by Spy in Vanity Fair, 1909.

Sir Harry Deeley Mallaby-Deeley, 1st Baronet (27 October 1863, London – 4 February 1937, Cannes) was a British Conservative Party politician.

Harry Deeley was educated at Shrewsbury School and Trinity College, Cambridge. His brother was the theatrical producer Frank Curzon.

He was the founder and first President of Prince's Golf Club at Mitcham. With his Cambridge University friend Percy Montagu Lucas he provided most of the capital to create new links at Sandwich, now Prince's Golf Club, Sandwich, the land being donated by the Earl of Guilford. The course was designed by Charles Hutchings, the 1902 Amateur Champion, and laid out between 1904 and 1906.

In 1913 he purchased the whole of the Duke of Bedford's Covent Garden estate for £2m., having already been involved in the purchase of the Piccadilly Hotel and St. James's Court, Buckingham Gate.

In 1922 he famously acquired control of the large estates of the cash-strapped Duke of Leinster during the latter's lifetime. Fitzgerald had previously sold Mallaby-Deeley his reversionary rights to the estate for a notional consideration, not expecting, as a younger son, to inherit.

Deeley was elected Member of Parliament for Harrow in 1910 and for Willesden East in 1918, resigning in 1923. In 1922 he assumed the additional name of Mallaby, his mother's maiden name, by deed poll and was created a baronet (of Micham Court, Surrey).

Parliament of the United Kingdom
Preceded by James Gibb	Member of Parliament for Harrow; 1910–1918	Succeeded by Oswald Mosley
New constituency	Member of Parliament for Willesden East; 1918–1923	Succeeded by Harcourt Johnstone
Baronetage of the United Kingdom
New creation	Baronet (of Mitcham Court); 1922–1937	Succeeded by Guy Mallaby-Deeley
