= 1940 Middlesbrough West by-election =

UK parliamentary by-election

The 1940 Middlesbrough West by-election was a parliamentary by-election held on 7 August 1940 for the British House of Commons constituency of Middlesbrough West.

== Previous MP ==
The seat had become vacant when the constituency's Liberal Member of Parliament (MP), Frank Kingsley Griffith (23 December 1889 – 25 September 1962) vacated his seat on becoming a County Court Judge.

Griffith was first elected as the constituency's MP at the 1928 Middlesbrough West by-election, caused by the death of the previous Liberal MP Walter Trevelyan Thomson. Griffith had previously contested Bromley in 1922, 1923 and 1924.

== Candidates ==
The election took place during the Second World War. Under an agreement between the Conservative, Labour and Liberal parties; who were participating in a wartime coalition, the party holding a seat would not be opposed by the other two at a by-election. Accordingly, the Liberal Party nominated a candidate, but no Labour or Conservative representative was put forward. As no one else was nominated, there was an unopposed return and no poll took place.

The Liberal Party candidate, supporting the coalition government, was Harcourt Johnstone (19 May 1895 – 1 March 1945).

Johnstone was elected unopposed as the constituency's MP at the by-election. He sat for the seat until he died. Johnstone had previously been MP for Willesden East 1923 – 1924 and South Shields 1931 – 1935.

== Result ==
7 August 1940 by-election: Middlesbrough West
Party	Candidate	Votes	%	±%
Liberal	Harcourt Johnstone	Unopposed	N/A	N/A
Liberal hold				

== See also ==
- Middlesbrough West constituency
- List of United Kingdom by-elections
- United Kingdom by-election records
