= Alan Johnstone =

British diplomat (1858–1932)

The Honourable Sir Alan Johnstone GCVO
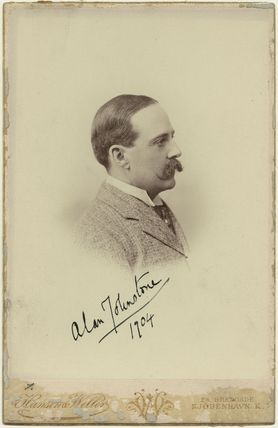

British Ambassador to Denmark
- In office 1905–1910
- Preceded by: Edward Goschen
- Succeeded by: Conyngham Greene

Personal details
- Born: 31 August 1858
- Died: 31 July 1932 (aged 73)
- Occupation: Diplomat

Sir Alan Vanden-Bempde-Johnstone GCVO (31 August 1858 – 31 July 1932) was a British diplomat.

== Biography ==
Johnstone was a younger son of Harcourt Vanden-Bempde-Johnstone, 1st Baron Derwent, and Charlotte Mills.

He entered Her Majesty's Diplomatic Service in 1879, and was promoted to Third Secretary in 1881, to Second Secretary in 1885, and to First Secretary in1901. He became Secretary of the Legation to Copenhagen in 1895, and moved to Germany as Secretary of the Legation (Charges d'Affaires) to Darmstadt and Karlsruhe in 1900. He was appointed a Commander of the Royal Victorian Order (CVO) in 1901. In April 1902 he represented the British King Edward VII during the Golden Jubilee of Frederick I, Grand Duke of Baden. The following year he was appointed Secretary at the Embassy in Vienna. He was promoted to the rank of Councillor of Embassy in 1904. In 1905 he became Ambassador to Denmark and served in that position until 1910. He was promoted to Knight Commander of the Royal Victorian Order (KCVO) in November 1905, and further promoted to Knight Grand Cross of the Order (GCVO) in 1908, on the occasion of the King's visit to Copenhagen. He was made a Grand Cross of the Order of the Dannebrog.

Between 1910 and 1917 he served as Envoy Extraordinary and Minister Plenipotentiary to the Netherlands and Luxembourg (the post was not upgraded to Ambassador until 1942). He was recalled in February 1917, being close to retirement age and due to some uneasiness in Whitehall that he had not promptly reported a peace feeler by the German Imperial Chancellor, Theobald von Bethmann Hollweg.

This last posting caused him to be put in a novel by Dennis Wheatley called The Second Seal (1950), about the outbreak of the Great War in 1914. When the hero (who is no less a person than the Duke de Richleau) escapes from Germany to neutral Holland with important information for the British Government, Johnstone, as His Britannic Majesty's Envoy to the Netherlands, plays a key part in springing him from jail, helping him dodge German agents and generally getting on his way. Johnstone is described as "...a courtly diplomat of the old school...". Though The Second Seal is a work of fiction, it is heavily based on fact, including the following bits of information about Johnstone:

" [Johnstone] held the belief that his duty lay in keeping a good and hospitable table in the country where he was stationed, and arranging for its notables to engage in golf tournaments with their British equivalents; and if he did that, the negotiation of rather dreary affairs, such as trade pacts, would prove a simple matter for those who understood them better than he did. The success of his missions proved that there was much to be said for this policy..."

When the hero reaches the safety of the British Legation at The Hague, Johnstone offers him some excellent brandy. Wheatley notes:

"[Johnstone] refrained from mentioning one of his own idiosyncrasies. As his friends rarely gave him brandy half as good when he dined out, it was his habit to take some of his own with him in his overcoat pocket in a medicine bottle. Then, when coffee was served, he asked the footman who was waiting on him to fetch his 'Medicine'."

Wheatley had earlier used this 'medicine' trick of Johnstone's in his 1936 thriller Contraband, attributing it to his well-connected character Sir Pellinore Gwaine-Cust (Chapter XXI). It is likely that Wheatley met Johnstone through Wheatley's second wife, Joan Pelham-Burn, as Johnstone was her uncle (she was the daughter of the Hon. Louis Johnstone, a younger brother of Sir Alan Johnstone's).

Johnstone married the American heiress Antoinette Pinchot, daughter of J. W. Pinchot of New York, on 21 December 1892. Their son was the Liberal politician Harcourt Johnstone.
