= Thornaby (constituency) =

UK Parliament constituency (1974–1983)

- Former borough constituency for the House of Commons
- Major settlements: Thornaby-on-Tees

1974–1983
- Seats: One
- Created from: Middlesbrough West
- Replaced by: Stockton South and Middlesbrough

Thornaby was a parliamentary constituency centred on the former borough of Thornaby-on-Tees in Teesside. It returned one Member of Parliament (MP) to the House of Commons of the Parliament of the United Kingdom.

The constituency was created for the February 1974 general election, mostly from the old seat of Middlesbrough West. It was abolished for the 1983 general election.

== Boundaries ==
The County Borough of Teesside wards of Acklam, Ayresome, Gresham, Linthorpe, Thornaby East, and Thornaby West.

== Members of Parliament ==
Election	Member	Party
Feb 1974	Ian Wrigglesworth	Labour Co-operative
1981	Ian Wrigglesworth	SDP
1983	constituency abolished	

== Results ==
=== Elections in the 1970s ===
1970 notional result
Party	Vote	%
Labour	24,100	50.7
Conservative	23,400	49.3
Turnout	47,500	73.5
Electorate	64,626	

General election February 1974: Thornaby
Party	Candidate	Votes	%	±%
Labour Co-op	Ian Wrigglesworth	21,503	43.8	−7.0
Conservative	John Sutcliffe	19,785	40.3	−9.0
Liberal	R Tennant	7,827	15.9	New
Majority		1,718	3.5	+2.0
Turnout		49,115	79.6	+6.1
Registered electors		61,665		
Labour Co-op hold		Swing	+1.0	

General election October 1974: Thornaby
Party	Candidate	Votes	%	±%
Labour Co-op	Ian Wrigglesworth	22,130	49.1	+5.3
Conservative	John Sutcliffe	17,482	38.8	−1.5
Liberal	R Tennant	5,442	12.1	−3.9
Majority		4,648	10.3	+6.8
Turnout		45,054	72.3	−7.4
Registered electors		62,330		
Labour Co-op hold		Swing	+3.4	

General election 1979: Thornaby
Party	Candidate	Votes	%	±%
Labour Co-op	Ian Wrigglesworth	23,597	51.1	+2.0
Conservative	J Jeffreys	18,073	39.1	+0.3
Liberal	N Patmore	4,255	9.2	−2.9
National Front	M Evans	251	0.5	New
Majority		5,524	12.0	+1.6
Turnout		46,176	74.7	+2.5
Registered electors		61,783		
Labour Co-op hold		Swing	+0.2	
