= John Rettie =

Cartmell John Alexander Rettie
- Born: 24 November 1925; Colombo, Ceylon
- Died: 11 January 2009 (aged 83); Friarage Hospital, Northallerton, North Yorkshire
- Occupation(s): Journalist, Broadcaster, Newspaper reporter

Cartmell John Alexander Rettie (24 November 1925, Colombo, Ceylon - 11 January 2009), known as John Rettie, was a British newspaper journalist and broadcaster.

In 1956, while working for Reuters in Moscow, capital of the Soviet Union, he was informed by a Soviet contact about details of Nikita Khrushchev's "Secret Speech" to the 20th Congress of the Communist Party, denouncing the crimes of Stalin. In a near 50-year career, he reported for The Guardian, Reuters, and the BBC World Service, covering some of the most critical events of the Cold War, from the Soviet Union and Latin America.

In 1964, he stood unsuccessfully for Middlesbrough West in the UK General Election, as the Liberal candidate.
