= Harcourt Johnstone =

British politician

The Right Honourable Harcourt Johnstone MP
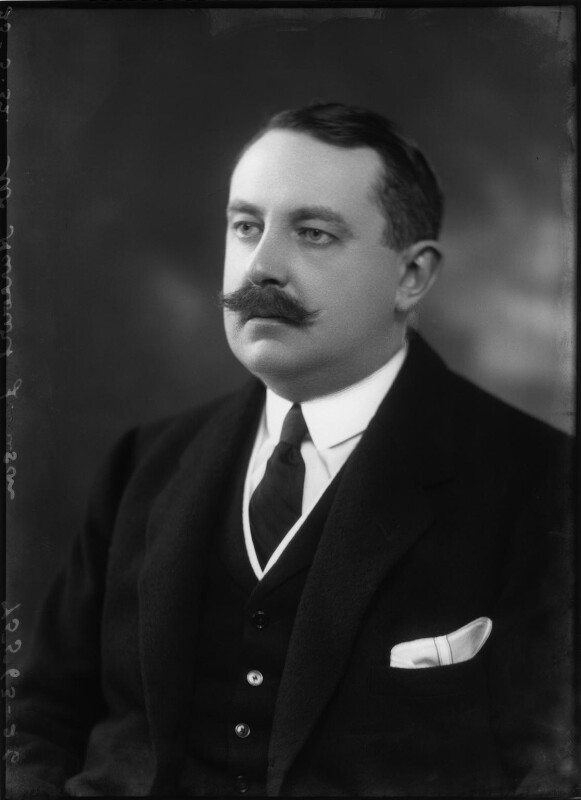

Member of Parliament for Middlesbrough West
- In office 7 August 1940 – 1 March 1945
- Preceded by: F. Kingsley Griffith
- Succeeded by: Don Bennett

Member of Parliament for South Shields
- In office 27 October 1931 – 25 October 1935
- Preceded by: James Chuter Ede
- Succeeded by: James Chuter Ede

Member of Parliament for Willesden East
- In office 3 March 1923 – 9 October 1924
- Preceded by: Harry Mallaby-Deeley
- Succeeded by: George Stanley

Personal details
- Born: 19 May 1895 Kensington, London, England
- Died: 1 March 1945 (aged 49) Westminster, London, England
- Party: Liberal
- Parent: Sir Alan Johnstone (father)
- Education: Balliol College, Oxford

Military service
- Allegiance: United Kingdom
- Branch/service: British Army
- Unit: Rifle Brigade
- Battles/wars: First World War

Harcourt Johnstone (19 May 1895 – 1 March 1945), nicknamed Crinks, was a British Liberal Party politician.

== Early life and education ==
Johnstone was born in London in 1895, the son of the Hon. Sir Alan Johnstone, a British diplomat, and his American wife Antoinette Pinchot. His nickname 'Crinks' is alleged to have derived from the wrinkled face he had as a baby. One of his ancestors was Sir William Vernon Harcourt (1827–1904) who was Home Secretary and Chancellor of the Exchequer under William Ewart Gladstone. His paternal grandfather was the first Baron Derwent. Harcourt Johnstone was educated at Eton College and at Balliol College, Oxford. In the First World War he served in the Rifle Brigade and on the staff in France and Belgium.

== Politics ==
Drawn to politics, he unsuccessfully contested Willesden East for the Liberals at the general election of 1922. However the sitting Tory MP, Sir H M Mallaby-Deeley, resigned in 1923 causing a by-election which was held on 3 March 1923. Johnstone was again chosen to contest the seat for the Liberals and won by a majority of 5,176 votes over the Conservative George Frederick Stanley. Johnstone held the seat in the 1923 general election, only to lose it to Stanley at the 1924 general election. He then tried and failed to return to the House of Commons at by-elections: first at Eastbourne in 1925 and later at Westbury in 1927, where he lost by just 149 votes. He fought Westbury a second time at the 1929 general election again losing narrowly. However at the 1931 general election he got in at South Shields, before losing the seat in 1935. In May 1940, even though Johnstone was outside Parliament, Winston Churchill decided to appoint him to the government as Secretary to the Department of Overseas Trade. Two months later the Liberal constituency of Middlesbrough West became vacant when the sitting MP, Frank Kingsley Griffith, was made a county court judge and Johnstone was returned for the seat at a by-election on 7 August 1940 unopposed under the terms of the wartime electoral truce. He was made a Privy Councillor in 1943. By common consent he was an effective minister. He is to date the last MP for South Shields to have represented any party other than Labour.

== Minister ==
Although little known today, Johnstone was the most prominent Liberal member of the wartime coalition government after Sir Archie Sinclair, who was Liberal leader from 1935 to 1945. He was a key figure in the Liberal Party Organisation between the two World Wars and was Secretary of the influential Liberal Candidates Association. He was a leading supporter of H. H. Asquith in the party split with David Lloyd George and used a lot of his own personal wealth to support the ailing Liberal party. During the National Government after 1931 he remained a faithful member of the Samuelite Liberals, always supporting the traditional policy of Free Trade against protectionism. After 1935, again out of Parliament, he gave close support to Sinclair and, despite the animosities of earlier years, endorsed Sinclair's attempts to reunite the Liberal party with the Lloyd George family group of MPs. Despite temptations to defect from the party during these years – and plenty did – he remained a constant Liberal.

Johnstone's unexpected return to government and Parliament in 1940 came about mainly as a result of his closeness to Sinclair and his friendship with Churchill. Johnstone had been a member and one-time co-secretary with Brendan Bracken of the Other Club since the early 1930s. The Other Club was a political dining club founded by Churchill and F. E. Smith in 1911. This fitted with Johnstone's reputation for enjoying the good life. In his diaries, "Chips", Sir Henry Channon said that Harcourt "dug his own grave with his teeth". He was known as a lover of books, furniture and pictures, being good fun and good company and not being a great exponent of taking exercise.

== Death ==
Aged only 49, Johnstone died suddenly in March 1945 at Westminster Hospital of a cerebral stroke. A memorial service was held for him at the Church of St. Margaret, Westminster on 13 March attended by the prime minister and Clementine Churchill, Clement Attlee (deputy prime minister) and Anthony Eden amongst prominent government mourners.

Parliament of the United Kingdom
Preceded by Sir Harry Mallaby-Deeley	Member of Parliament for Willesden East; 1923–1924	Succeeded by George Stanley
Preceded by Chuter Ede	Member of Parliament for South Shields; 1931–1935	Succeeded by Chuter Ede
Preceded by F. Kingsley Griffith	Member of Parliament for Middlesbrough West; 1940–1945	Succeeded by Don Bennett
