= Alonza Ellis =

British politician and trade unionist (1880–1937)

Alonza Randolph Ellis (1880 – 31 July 1937) was a British politician and trade unionist.

Born in Huddersfield, Ellis became the Bradford district secretary of the National Amalgamated Union of Enginemen, Firemen, Mechanics, Motormen and Electrical Workers. He was also elected to Bradford City Council for the Labour Party. When the union merged into the Transport and General Workers' Union (TGWU), he continued as its Bradford Power Group secretary, then in 1933 he transferred to Liverpool, again as a secretary for the Power Group.

Ellis stood in the 1928 Middlesbrough West by-election, taking 36.0% of the vote, and narrowly missing out on election. He stood again at the 1929 United Kingdom general election, increasing his vote to 36.9%, but finishing further behind the winner. At the 1931 United Kingdom general election, he instead stood in Nottingham South. He took 31.7% of the vote, finishing well behind the National Labour incumbent. He had a wife, Annie Austin Ellis.

In July 1937, Ellis was travelling in a car driven by Harry O. Pugh, the TGWU's Liverpool District Secretary. Pugh lost control of the car, and Ellis died of his injuries sustained in the resulting crash at hospital in Douglas, Isle of Man.
