= 1962 Middlesbrough West by-election =

UK Parliamentary by-election

The 1962 Middlesbrough West by-election was held on 6 June 1962, after the incumbent Conservative MP, Sir Jocelyn Simon, was appointed as President of the Probate, Divorce and Admiralty Division of the High Court. The by-election was won by the Labour candidate, Jeremy Bray, who retained the seat at the 1964 general election.

Malcolm Thompson had been denied a requested discharge from the British Armed Forces to enroll at university. He instead availed of the automatic military discharge for Parliamentary candidates at the cost of losing his election deposit. Eight candidates at four by-elections in November followed his example before the rules on election military discharges were tightened in 1963.

Middlesbrough West by-election, 1962
Party	Candidate	Votes	%	±%
Labour	Jeremy Bray	15,095	39.67	+4.22
Conservative	Bernard Connelly	12,825	33.70	−21.18
Liberal	George Scott	9,829	25.83	+16.16
Independent	Russell Ernest Eckley	189	0.50	New
Independent	Malcolm Thompson	117	0.31	New
Majority		2,270	5.97	N/A
Turnout		38,055		
Labour gain from Conservative		Swing		
