= F. Kingsley Griffith =

British Liberal politician, barrister and judge

His Honour Frank Kingsley Griffith MC
- Kingsley Griffith circa 1915

Member of Parliament for Middlesbrough West
- In office 7 March 1928 – 1940
- Preceded by: Trevelyan Thomson
- Succeeded by: Harcourt Johnstone

Personal details
- Born: Frank Kingsley Griffith; 23 December 1889 Upper Norwood, Surrey, England
- Died: 25 September 1962 (aged 74)
- Party: Liberal
- Spouses: Eleanor Bruce (m. 1924; died 1954) Margaret Louch (m. 1955)
- Children: 1
- Education: Balliol College, Oxford

Frank Kingsley Griffith, MC (23 December 1889 – 25 September 1962) was a British Liberal Party politician, barrister and County Court judge.

== Early life ==
Frank Kingsley Griffith was born on 23 December 1889 in Upper Norwood, Surrey, the son of Florence Emily "Mimmie" (née Hudson) and Frank F Griffith, an officer in the Volunteer Force, later a Director of a Printing Factory who was elected as the first Mayor of the Municipal Borough of Bromley in 1904. His younger sister Olga Collett, became a BBC broadcaster described as "Britain's Ace Radio Talker".

Griffith was educated at Marlborough and Balliol College, Oxford. In 1912 he was president of the Oxford Union. Griffith served in the army throughout the First World War first in the Gloucestershire Regiment and then the Lincolnshire Regiment, attaining the rank of captain. He was wounded twice and was awarded the Military Cross. In 1915 he was called to the bar by the Inner Temple and after the war he joined the North-Eastern Circuit.

== Politics ==
Griffith was one time chairman of the National League of Young Liberals. He was well known as a good platform performer in politics and for being an outstanding young thinker ranked alongside the likes of Elliott Dodds. He contested the Bromley division of Kent for the Liberal party in the general elections of 1922, 1923 and 1924 being unsuccessful on all three occasions.

By 1927, Griffith was so well thought of in Liberal circles that he was appointed to the Liberal Organizing Committee under the Chairmanship of future party leader Herbert Samuel. Also appointed at the time was Archie Sinclair, another future leader. In March 1928 he was adopted as candidate for the by-election in the Liberal seat of Middlesbrough West which he held in a three cornered contest. The deceased Liberal incumbent, Trevelyan Thomson, had been so entrenched in the seat that he had been unopposed at the previous general election. However Labour put up a strong challenge against Griffith at the by-election, losing by just 89 votes. Griffith got 36.3% of the poll, compared to Labour's 36% and the Conservatives' 27.8%. Griffith fought mainly on the traditional Liberal stance of Free Trade but also called for a programme of public works together with social reform and industrial reconstruction. This platform anticipated the Liberal election manifesto of 1929 based on the 'coloured' books of David Lloyd George and the economic models of John Maynard Keynes. In fact Lloyd George turned up to speak for Griffith in the campaign, as did Herbert Samuel. In 1931–32 Griffith was parliamentary private secretary to Sir Herbert Samuel, by then the Home Secretary and Liberal leader. Griffith's sister Olga Collett gave speeches on behalf of her brother.

Once elected to the House of Commons he gained the respect of his peers in the Parliamentary Liberal Party, as he was a skilled parliamentary speaker.

== Law ==
In the law, Griffith was Recorder of Richmond, Yorkshire, from 1932 to 1940 and in 1940 he was appointed a County Court Judge in Hull which required him to vacate his Commons seat and create a by-election. At this election the Liberal candidate Harcourt Johnstone was returned unopposed under the wartime electoral truce. From 1947 to 1956 Griffith was chairman of East Riding Quarter Sessions and he retired as a judge in January 1957.

== Family ==
In 1924 he married Eleanor Bruce who was the only daughter of Sir Robert Bruce. and they had one daughter. His wife died in 1954 and Griffith was remarried the following year to Margaret Louch. He died in Scarborough, North Yorkshire on 25 September 1962.

Parliament of the United Kingdom
Preceded by Trevelyan Thomson	Member of Parliament for Middlesbrough West; 1928–1940	Succeeded by Harcourt Johnstone
