= Richard Stone =

British economist and Nobel Laureate (1913–1991)

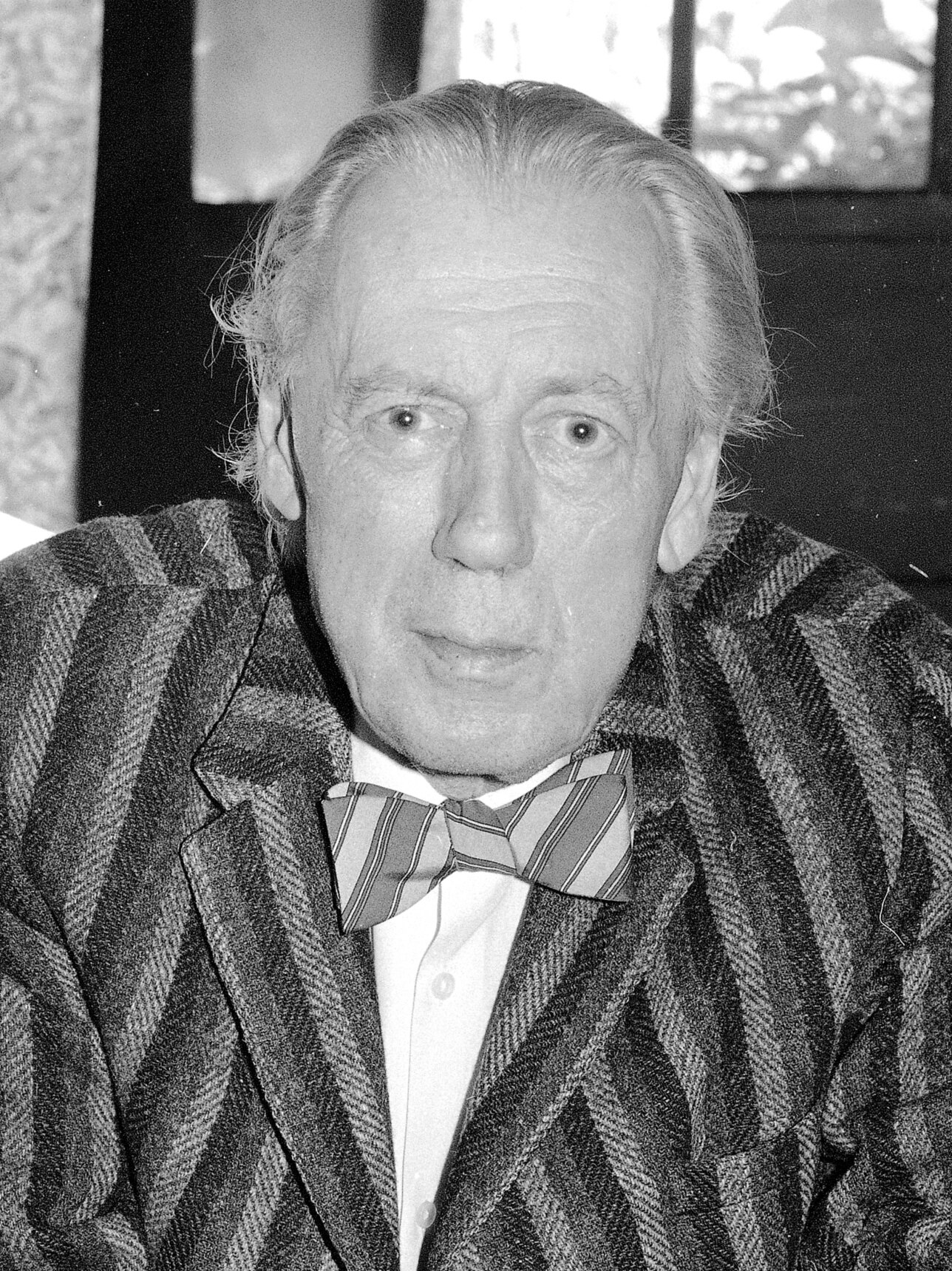
- Stone in 1984
- Born: 30 August 1913; London, England
- Died: 6 December 1991 (aged 78); Cambridge, England
- Children: 1

Academic background
- Education: Gonville and Caius College, Cambridge; King's College, Cambridge
- Influences: James Meade; Colin Clark

Academic work
- Discipline: Economics
- Institutions: Cambridge University
- Doctoral students: James Mirrlees; Angus Deaton
- Notable ideas: National accounts, input-output
- Awards: Nobel Memorial Prize in Economic Sciences (1984)
- Website: Information at IDEAS / RePEc

Sir John Richard Nicholas Stone CBE FBA (30 August 1913 – 6 December 1991) was a British economist. He was educated at Gonville and Caius College and King's College at the University of Cambridge. In 1984, he was awarded the Nobel Memorial Prize in Economic Sciences for developing an accounting model that could be used to track economic activities on a national and, later, an international scale.

== Early life and education ==
Richard Stone was born in London on 30 August 1913. He received an English upper middle class education when he was a child as he attended Cliveden Place and Westminster School. However, he had not been taught mathematics and science until secondary school. When he was 17 years old, he followed his father to India as his father was appointed as a judge in Madras. From India, he visited many Asian countries: Malaya, Singapore, and Indonesia. After travelling for one year, he went back to London and then matriculated at Gonville and Caius College, Cambridge, in 1931, where he studied law for two years.

The young Stone then changed to studying economics. He was interested in economics as he thought that "if there were more economists, the world would be a better place". During the Great Slump of the 1930s, unemployment was very high and this motivated him to know what caused it and how to overcome it. He faced a challenge from his parents as they were disappointed with his choice. However, Stone was very enthusiastic to be an economist and then enjoyed his time studying economics. At his new major, he got supervision from Richard Kahn and Gerald Shove. However, Stone's quantitative mind had been greatly influenced by Colin Clark, Stone's teacher in statistics at Cambridge. Clark then introduced Stone to his project in measuring the national income. This project then brought the greatest name for Stone as he received Nobel Prize because of this topic. After their meeting at Cambridge, Stone and Clark then became best friends.

== Career ==
After graduating from Cambridge in 1935 and until World War II he worked at Lloyd's of London. During the war, Stone worked with James Meade as a statistician and economist for the British Government. At the government's request, they analyzed the UK's economy related to the current total resources of the nation for the war time. It was at this time that they developed the early versions of the system of national accounts. Their work resulted in the U.K.'s first national accounts in 1941.

The collaboration between Stone and Meade was over after 1941 as their office was split into two different ones. They then worked separately, Meade being responsible for the Economic Section and Stone, for the national income. In his new office, the Central Statistical Office, Stone became John Maynard Keynes' assistant. Stone left working for the government when the war ended in 1945.

After the war, Stone took up an academic career when he worked at Cambridge as the director of the new Department of Applied Economics (1945–1955). As the director, Stone made the Department focus on research programmes about economic theory and statistical methodology. This strategy attracted many top economists in that era to join the Department. Some remarkable works at the Department were, for example, Durbin and Watson on testing serial correlation in econometrics, and Alan Prest and Derek Rowe on demand analysis. This condition made DAE become one of the leading quantitative economic research centres in the world in his era. Stone himself had many projects in DAE: national accounting where he had employed Agatha Chapman as a research associate, the analysis of consumer demand, and the system of socio-demographic account.

In 1955, Stone gave up his Directorship at the department as he was appointed as the P.D. Leake Chair of Finance and Accounting at Cambridge (emeritus from 1980). Together with J.A.C. Brown he began the Cambridge Growth Project, which developed the Cambridge Multisectoral Dynamic Model of the British economy (MDM). In building the Cambridge Growth Project, they used Social Accounting Matrices (SAM), which also formed computable equilibrium model which then developed at the World Bank. He was succeeded as leader of the Cambridge Growth Project by Terry Barker. In 1970, Stone was appointed as the Chairman of the Faculty Board of Economics and Politics for the next two years. A company founded by members of the Department and limited by guarantee, Cambridge Econometrics, was founded in 1978 with Stone as its first honorary president. The company continues to develop MDM and to use the model to make economic forecasts. Before retiring from Cambridge in 1980, Stone served as the President of the Royal Economic Society for 1978–1980.

== Achievements ==
Stone in 1984 received the Nobel Memorial Prize in Economic Sciences for developing an accounting model that could be used to track economic activities on a national and, later, an international scale.

While he was not the first economist to work in this field, he was the first to do so with double entry accounting. Double entry accounting basically states that every income item on one side of the balance sheet must be met by an expenditure item on the opposite side of the accounting sheet therefore creating a system of balance. This double entry system is the basis of nearly all modern accounting today. This allowed for a reliable way of tracking trade and wealth transfer on a global scale.

He is sometimes known as the 'father of national income accounting', and is the author of studies of consumer demand statistics and demand modeling, economic growth, and input-output.

During his acceptance speech Stone mentioned François Quesnay as well as the Tableau économique. Stone stated that it was one of the first works in economics to examine various sectors on such a global level and how they are all interconnected.

== Personal life ==
Stone married three times. In 1936, he married Winifred Mary Jenkins who was also from Cambridge. Both of them had a passion for Economics and started a monthly paper called Trends, which was a supplement to the periodical, Industry Illustrated. It contained articles about the British economic conditions. Soon after, in 1939, he was asked to join the Ministry of Economic Warfare. The couple's marriage dissolved in 1940.

Soon after, In 1941 Stone married his second wife Feodora Leontinoff. Feodora died in 1956.

In 1960, he married Giovanna Saffi (1919–2009), great-grandchild of Italian patriot Aurelio Saffi, who became his partner in many of his works. They collaborated for some projects in economics, for example in rewriting his book "National Income and Expenditure" in 1961.

== Death ==
Stone died on 6 December 1991 in Cambridge, aged 78. He was survived by his third wife Giovanna, and his daughter Caroline.

== Selected publications ==
- Richard Stone and Giovanna Saffi Stone, Social Accounting and Economic Models (1959)
- Richard Stone and Giovanna Saffi Stone, National Income and Expenditure (1961).
- Richard Stone, "The Cambridge Growth Project", Cambridge Research, October 1965 (pp. 9–15)

Awards
Preceded by Gérard Debreu	Laureate of the Nobel Memorial Prize in Economics; 1984	Succeeded by Franco Modigliani
