= Geoffrey Cooper (politician) =

British politician (1907–1995)

Geoffrey Cooper (18 February 1907 – 10 April 1995) was a British farmer, architect, politician and writer.

Educated at Wyggeston Grammar School in Leicester and the Royal Grammar School in Worcester, Cooper joined the Auxiliary Air Force in 1933. He served as a pilot with the Royal Air Force during World War II, initially with Fighter Command, then after a period with the British Overseas Airways Corporation, he returned to action in the Coastal Command, leaving the force as a wing commander.

Cooper was elected as the Labour Member of Parliament (MP) for Middlesbrough West in 1945. On the train back to London, he happened to travel from Darlington with James Chuter Ede, who was shortly to become Home Secretary. Ede found Cooper to be "a very bright intelligent man … if all our Service members are like him we have secured a great improvement’ in Labour MPs".

In 1951, Cooper stood down from Parliament. He later emigrated to the Bahamas, where he became the president of a development company.

Parliament of the United Kingdom
Preceded by Don Bennett	Member of Parliament for Middlesbrough West; 1945 – 1951	Succeeded by Jocelyn Simon
