= 1962 Middlesbrough East by-election =

UK Parliamentary by-election

The Middlesbrough East 1962 by-election to the British House of Commons constituency of Middlesbrough East was held on 14 March 1962, following the resignation of the seat by Hilary Marquand in the previous year.

== Result ==
The seat was held by the Labour Party.

1962 Middlesbrough East by-election
Party	Candidate	Votes	%	±%
Labour	Arthur Bottomley	18,928	60.60	−0.94
Liberal	George Scott	7,145	22.87	New
Conservative	Frederick A. S. Wood	4,613	14.77	−23.69
Union Movement	Jeffrey Hamm	550	1.76	New
Majority		11,783	37.72	+14.63
Turnout		31,236	52.1	−24.1
Labour hold		Swing		

== See also ==
- List of United Kingdom by-elections
- Middlesbrough
