= Trevelyan Thomson =

British politician

Thomson in 1921

Walter Trevelyan Thomson (30 April 1875 – 8 February 1928) was a British Liberal Member of Parliament, iron and steel merchant and soldier.

== Family and education ==
Trevelyan Thomson (he rarely used his first name of Walter) was born in Stockton on Tees, the son of an iron founder and merchant. He was educated in the Quaker tradition at The Friends' School, Ackworth in the West Riding of Yorkshire and Bootham School in York. He joined his father in business as iron and steel merchants in Albert Road, Middlesbrough. In 1907 he married Hilda Mary Tolley, the daughter of a minister of religion from London. They had one son and a daughter.

== Retreat from Quakerism and the Great War ==
Thomson was a birthright Friend claiming Quaker connections back to the days of George Fox. In 1914 he seemed a model Quaker citizen but the Middlesbrough Society of Friends took a strong anti-war stand in 1914 on the basis of the traditional Quaker belief that no war can be defended and Thomson dissented from this position, tendering his resignation from the Society. Thomson was too old to join up at the start of the war but he helped the military by encouraging recruiting. While individuals joining the armed forces might be tolerated by the Quakers, a member of the religion actively encouraging others to enlist while still publicly holding a position in the Society was too much and the Quakers disowned him. Although his membership was later restored, he rejected his re-instatement and resigned from the Society of Friends. By 1917 the army had relaxed its age rules for volunteers so Thomson enlisted in the Royal Engineers. He served overseas reaching the rank of Sergeant but there was to be no reconciliation with the Society of Friends after the War ended.

== Local politics ==
Thomson had become an established and respected Middlesbrough businessman and like so many other Victorian and Edwardian successes, he wished to serve his community and his ambition through politics. He was an elected member of Middlesbrough County Borough Council in 1904 and served until his death in 1928. He was also a Justice of Peace.

== Member of Parliament ==
Thomson graduated to Parliamentary politics at the end of the First World War. At the 1918 general election, the still serving Sergeant Thomson stood for election in Middlesbrough West. There is disagreement as to his party affiliation. In The Times House of Commons, 1919 he was described as a Coalition Liberal although it seems unlikely that he received the government coupon. He certainly had no Conservative opponent but he may have identified with the coalition because it had successfully prosecuted the war in which he had just served. In other sources he is described simply as a Liberal. He defeated his Labour opponent by 10,958 votes to 5,350 – a majority of 5,608. At the 1922 general election Thomson faced a National Liberal candidate, i.e. one supporting the outgoing coalition prime minister David Lloyd George but again won comfortably by 16,811 votes to 7,422 - a majority of 9,389. At the general election the following year Thomson again faced no Tory candidate and easily beat his Labour opponent by 16,837 votes to 7,413 – a majority of 9,424.

== The 1924 general election ==
Thomson held his seat in the 1924 election because he was one of only a few Liberal MPs to establish a considerable personal following with his local electorate and he was well known for his many Parliamentary interventions, questions to ministers and contributions to debate in the House of Commons. While the Liberal Party nationally was experiencing electoral meltdown, Thomson enjoyed the luxury of being returned unopposed. There was a rumour circulating after the election that Thomson was to be asked to stand down and cause a by-election in Middlesbrough to make way for a return to the Commons by H H Asquith, who had lost his seat at Paisley. Thomson certainly made a hasty trip down to London immediately after the election for political meetings but he denied he had been asked to stand aside and no such by-election ever took place. Asquith was made a peer in 1925.

== Political position ==
Thomson has been described by one historian as a 'right-wing Liberal who received prolonged Conservative support' Despite this he did vote with the Labour Party in Parliament from time to time. Significantly these occasions included Labour's vote of censure against the Tory administration of Stanley Baldwin in July 1925 and the Trades Union Bill in February 1927 with further support for Labour on the intimidation clauses of that Bill in May 1927. He was also in agreement with Asquith's support of the first Labour government of 1924.

Thomson in December 1924, was a founding member of the 'Radical Group' of Liberal MPs. The Group was formed because Asquith had lost his seat and David Lloyd George had become chair of the Parliamentary Liberal Party in his place. Thomson had voted against Lloyd George for this post. The 'Radical Group' did not think Lloyd George was reliable because of his past coalition with the Tories.

== Death ==
Thomson died at nursing home in London aged 52 on 8 February 1928 having collapsed following a severe operation a week earlier. His health had been poor for a while. In November 1926 he had to decline the offer of being an assistant Liberal Whip for reasons of ill health and he underwent an operation in 1927. Thomson was a personal friend of the Reverend P B Clayton who founded the organisation Toc H and Clayton took part in Thomson's memorial service at St. Margaret's Church, Westminster.

Parliament of the United Kingdom
New constituency	Member of Parliament for Middlesbrough West; 1918–1928	Succeeded by Frank Kingsley Griffith
