= Willesden East =

Parliamentary constituency in the United Kingdom, 1918–1974

- Former borough constituency for the House of Commons
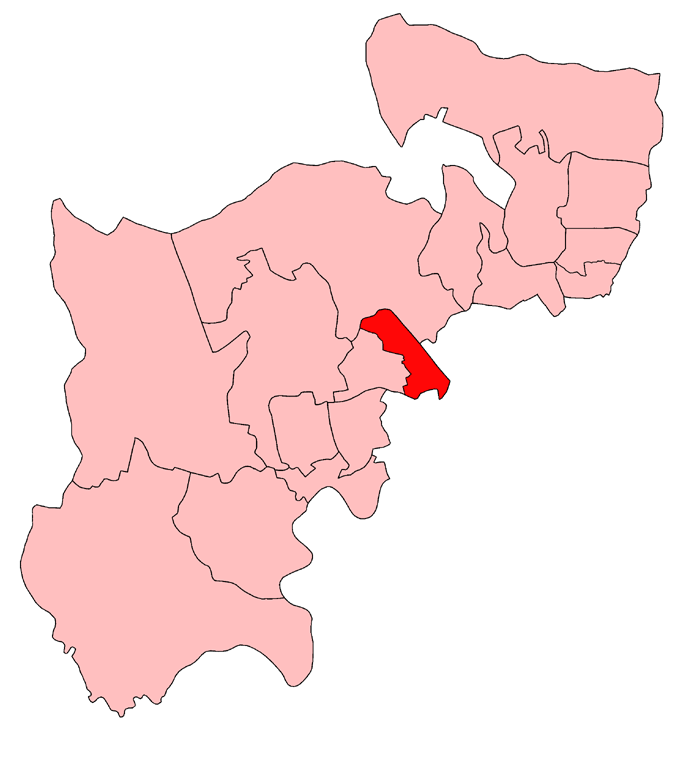
- Willesden East in Middlesex 1918-50
- Major settlements: Cricklewood, approximately half of Neasden, Kilburn and part of Maida Vale

1918–February 1974
- Seats: one
- Created from: Harrow (small part of)
- Replaced by: Brent East (similar boundaries); Brent South (small part of)

Map that gives each named seat and any constant electoral success for national (Westminster) elections for Middlesex, 1955 to 1974.

Willesden East (/wɪlzdən/) was a constituency in Middlesex adjoining the County of London and forming part of the London conurbation, in London itself from 1965. It returned one member to the House of Commons of the UK Parliament 1918 – 1974.

The outcome of the seat was a bellwether of the national outcome from 1931 until its abolition. Before 1945 the seats electorate had not elected any Labour candidate, however had sided overall with the Liberal candidate once, in 1923, in a by-election.

== Boundaries ==
1918–1950: The Urban District of Willesden wards of Brondesbury Park, Cricklewood, Kensal Rise, Mid Kilburn, North Kilburn, and South Kilburn.

1950–1974: The Municipal Borough of Willesden wards of Brondesbury Park, Carlton, Cricklewood, Kilburn, Mapesbury, and Neasden.

In 1966, 10.8% of the constituency was born in the New Commonwealth.

== Members of Parliament ==
Election	Member	Party
1918	Sir Harry Mallaby-Deeley	Conservative
1923 by-election	Harcourt Johnstone	Liberal
1924	George Stanley	Conservative
1929	Daniel Somerville	Conservative
1938 by-election	Samuel Hammersley	Conservative
1945	Maurice Orbach	Labour
1959	Trevor Skeet	Conservative
1964	Reg Freeson	Labour
Feb 1974	constituency abolished	

== Elections ==
=== Elections in the 1910s ===
Mallaby-Deeley

General election 1918: Willesden East
Party		Candidate	Votes	%	±%
C	Unionist	Harry Mallaby-Deeley	12,044	61.0	
	Labour	Henry James Lincoln	4,941	25.0	
	Liberal	Herbert John Doree	2,757	14.0	
Majority			7,103	36.0	
Turnout			19,742	50.9	
	Unionist win (new seat)				
C indicates candidate endorsed by the coalition government.

=== Elections in the 1920s ===
General election 1922: Willesden East
Party	Candidate	Votes	%	±%
Unionist	Harry Mallaby-Deeley	12,525	52.8	−8.2
Liberal	Harcourt Johnstone	11,211	47.2	+33.2
Majority		1,314	5.6	−31.4
Turnout		23,736	58.4	+7.5
Unionist hold		Swing	-20.7	

1923 Willesden East by-election
Party	Candidate	Votes	%	±%
Liberal	Harcourt Johnstone	14,824	60.6	+13.4
Unionist	George Stanley	9,648	39.4	−13.4
Majority		5,176	21.2	N/A
Turnout		24,472	60.2	+1.8
Liberal gain from Unionist		Swing	+13.4	

General election 1923: Willesden East
Party	Candidate	Votes	%	±%
Liberal	Harcourt Johnstone	11,260	40.5	−6.7
Unionist	George Stanley	11,146	40.1	−12.7
Labour	Joseph George Butler	5,392	19.4	New
Majority		114	0.4	−5.2
Turnout		27,798	68.1	+9.7
Liberal hold		Swing		

General election 1924: Willesden East
Party	Candidate	Votes	%	±%
Unionist	George Stanley	15,965	50.2	+10.1
Liberal	Harcourt Johnstone	7,992	25.1	−15.4
Labour	William Davies Lloyd	7,860	24.7	+5.3
Majority		7,973	25.1	N/A
Turnout		31,817	76.0	+7.9
Unionist gain from Liberal		Swing	+12.7	

General election 1929: Willesden East
Party	Candidate	Votes	%	±%
Unionist	Daniel Somerville	17,090	40.4	−9.8
Labour	William Davies Lloyd	13,977	33.1	+8.4
Liberal	Maurice Gordon Liverman	11,190	26.5	+1.4
Majority		3,113	7.3	−17.8
Turnout		42,257	69.3	−6.7
Unionist hold		Swing	-9.1	

=== Elections in the 1930s ===
General election 1931: Willesden East
Party	Candidate	Votes	%	±%
Conservative	Daniel Somerville	28,993	62.1	+21.7
Labour	William Davies Lloyd	10,010	21.4	−11.7
Liberal	Joseph Samuel Bridges	7,684	16.5	−10.0
Majority		18,983	40.7	+33.4
Turnout		46,687	68.3	−1.0
Conservative hold		Swing	+16.7	

General election 1935: Willesden East
Party	Candidate	Votes	%	±%
Conservative	Daniel Somerville	25,613	57.7	−4.4
Labour	Maurice Orbach	15,523	35.0	+13.6
Liberal	Nancy Stewart Parnell	3,217	7.3	−9.2
Majority		10,090	22.7	−18.0
Turnout		44,353	62.0	−6.3
Conservative hold		Swing	-9.0	

1938 Willesden East by-election
Party	Candidate	Votes	%	±%
Conservative	Samuel Hammersley	16,009	56.6	−1.1
Labour	Maurice Orbach	12,278	43.4	+8.4
Majority		3,731	13.2	−9.5
Turnout		28,287	39.3	−22.7
Conservative hold		Swing	-4.7	

=== Elections in the 1940s ===
General Election 1939–40:

Another General Election was required to take place before the end of 1940. The political parties had been making preparations for an election to take place from 1939 and by the end of this year, the following candidates had been selected;

- Conservative: Samuel Hammersley
- Labour: Maurice Orbach
- Liberal: Arthur Shenfield

General election 1945: Willesden East
Party	Candidate	Votes	%	±%
Labour	Maurice Orbach	23,457	53.00	+9.60
Conservative	Samuel Hammersley	14,027	31.70	−14.90
Liberal	RLR Morgan	6,771	15.30	+8.00
Majority		9,430	21.30	N/A
Turnout		44,255	72.69	+33.39
Registered electors		60,882		
Labour gain from Conservative		Swing	+12.25	

=== Elections in the 1950s ===
General election 1950: Willesden East
Party	Candidate	Votes	%	±%
Labour	Maurice Orbach	24,345	47.13	−5.87
Conservative	Samuel Hammersley	21,004	40.66	+8.96
Liberal	Walter John Done	6,310	12.21	−3.09
Majority		3,341	6.47	−14.84
Turnout		51,659	82.53	+9.84
Registered electors		62,596		
Labour hold		Swing	-7.42	

General election 1951: Willesden East
Party	Candidate	Votes	%	±%
Labour	Maurice Orbach	26,695	51.81	+4.68
Conservative	Ronald E Simms	24,827	48.19	+7.53
Majority		1,868	3.62	−2.85
Turnout		51,522	81.83	−0.70
Registered electors		62,962		
Labour hold		Swing	-1.43	

General election 1955: Willesden East
Party	Candidate	Votes	%	±%
Labour	Maurice Orbach	23,397	50.71	−1.10
Conservative	Ronald E Simms	22,738	49.29	+1.10
Majority		659	1.42	−2.20
Turnout		46,135	76.13	−5.70
Registered electors		60,604		
Labour hold		Swing	-1.10	

General election 1959: Willesden East
Party	Candidate	Votes	%	±%
Conservative	Trevor Skeet	22,709	52.56	+3.27
Labour	Maurice Orbach	20,499	47.44	−3.27
Majority		2,210	5.12	N/A
Turnout		43,208	73.40	−2.73
Registered electors		58,865		
Conservative gain from Labour		Swing	+3.27	

=== Elections in the 1960s ===
General election 1964: Willesden East
Party	Candidate	Votes	%	±%
Labour	Reg Freeson	20,543	52.27	+4.83
Conservative	Trevor Skeet	18,755	47.73	−4.83
Majority		1,788	4.54	N/A
Turnout		39,298	68.76	−4.64
Registered electors		57,153		
Labour gain from Conservative		Swing	+4.83	

General election 1966: Willesden East
Party	Candidate	Votes	%	±%
Labour	Reg Freeson	21,767	54.62	+2.35
Conservative	Peter Fry	14,761	37.04	−10.69
Liberal	Malcolm H Brahams	2,765	6.94	New
Independent	Olive Bysouth	556	1.40	New
Majority		7,006	17.58	+13.04
Turnout		39,849	71.05	+2.29
Registered electors		56,085		
Labour hold		Swing	+6.52	

=== Elections in the 1970s ===
General election 1970: Willesden East
Party	Candidate	Votes	%	±%
Labour	Reg Freeson	20,073	56.33	+1.71
Conservative	Horace Cutler	15,564	43.67	+6.63
Majority		4,509	12.66	−4.92
Turnout		35,637	62.35	−8.70
Registered electors		57,152		
Labour hold		Swing	-2.46	
