= Spen Valley (constituency) =

UK Parliament constituency (1885–1950, 2024 onwards)

Coordinates: 53.71°N 1.7°W

- Borough constituency for the House of Commons
- Boundaries since 2024
- Boundary of Spen Valley in Yorkshire and the Humber
- County: West Yorkshire
- Major settlements: Mirfield; Birstall; Gomersal; Heckmondwike; Cleckheaton

Current constituency
- Created: 2024
- Member of Parliament: Kim Leadbeater (Labour)
- Seats: One
- Created from: Batley and Spen; Dewsbury (part); Huddersfield (minor part)

1885–1950
- Seats: One
- Created from: Eastern West Riding of Yorkshire
- Replaced by: Batley and Morley, Brighouse and Spenborough and Dewsbury

Spen Valley is a parliamentary constituency in the valley of the River Spen in the West Riding of Yorkshire. It returns one Member of Parliament (MP) to the House of Commons of the Parliament of the United Kingdom.

Further to the completion of the 2023 review of Westminster constituencies, the seat was re-established for the 2024 general election, formed primarily from the (abolished) constituency of Batley and Spen.

The seat is currently represented by Kim Leadbeater who previously represented Batley and Spen from 2021 to 2024.

== Constituency profile ==
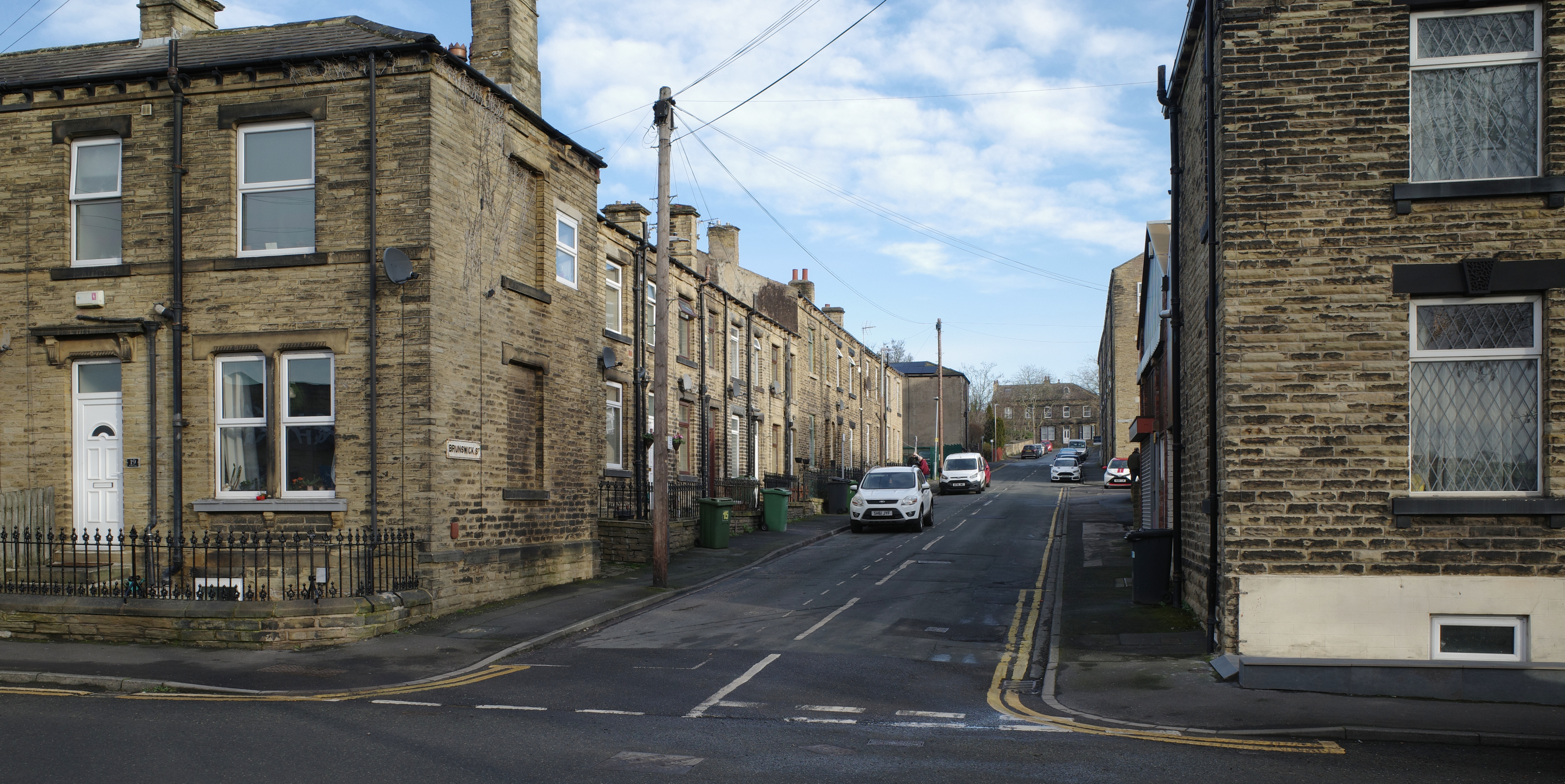
Brunswick Street, Heckmondwike

Spen Valley is a constituency in West Yorkshire in England, within the borough of Kirklees. Its largest town is Mirfield, which has a population of around 20,000. Other settlements include the towns of Heckmondwike, Liversedge, Cleckheaton and Birstall and the villages of Gomersal, Birkenshaw and Kirkheaton. The constituency is named after the River Spen, which flows through it.

Spen Valley covers the towns and villages located between Dewsbury and Bradford. This area has an industrial heritage; it forms part of the Heavy Woollen District, a region known for its textile production, and it also has a history of coal mining. The decline of these industries in the late 20th century had a negative economic effect on the area; Mirfield and the rural villages are largely affluent but Heckmondwike and Cleckheaton remain highly-deprived. House prices across the constituency are generally similar to the rest of Yorkshire but lower than the UK average.

Spen Valley has a below-average proportion of young adults and an above-average retired population. Residents have average levels of income and high rates of homeownership, but the child poverty rate is above-average. They generally have low levels of education and a high proportion work in the manufacturing, retail and construction sectors. The percentage of residents claiming unemployment benefits is in line with the UK-wide rate. White people made up 88% of the population at the 2021 census. Asians, mostly of Pakistani origin, were 8% of residents, although they made up around a third of the population in Heckmondwike.

At the local borough council, most of the constituency is represented by Reform UK with some Conservatives elected in Birstall and some Liberal Democrats elected in Cleckheaton. Voters in Spen Valley strongly supported leaving the European Union in the 2016 referendum; an estimated 62% voted in favour of Brexit compared to the UK-wide figure of 52%.

== History ==
The constituency was created by the Redistribution of Seats Act 1885 for the 1885 general election, retained with altered boundaries in 1918, and abolished for the 1950 general election. In the 1901 Census, there were 13,557 inhabited houses in the division; there were 10,960 registered electors, of which 9,396 qualified by virtue of occupying property within the division, 1,490 by virtue of owning property, 67 by virtue of occupying land only within the division, and 7 qualifying as lodgers.

Political historian Henry Pelling noted that the constituency as it existed from 1885 to 1918 was dominated by the woollen industry and carpetmaking, where the vast bulk of the population were nonconformist: the Church of England parish of Birstall was said to have had only four clergymen in the eighteenth century (two of whom were schoolmasters). In 1922, membership of nonconformist circuits in the constituency is estimated at 2,759 for the Congregational Church, 1,065 Wesleyan Methodism, 1,027 United Methodist Church, 698 Primitive Methodism, and 328 Baptists, making it the second largest nonconformist attendance in the West Riding.

The death of the sitting MP in 1919 led to a sensational by-election gain for the Labour Party, which was described by historian Maurice Cowling as the worst result for the Coalition during the 1918–22 Parliament; John Ramsden admitted that Labour's win had a big psychological impact on the Coalition but thought the result was a "freak win" given that Labour had under 40% of the vote. At the ensuing general election, the Manchester Guardian described the constituency as "scattered between the three towns of Leeds, Bradford and Huddersfield", centred on Cleckheaton, and populated by "woollen and wire workers, miners, card manufacturers". A significant presence of Irish voters was also noted. Sir John Simon, a former Home Secretary who had lost his seat in the 1918 election, regained the seat for the Liberals in 1922 and held it until given a Peerage in 1940. During this period Simon moved from declaring his basic sympathy with the Labour Party's objects, to forming the Liberal Nationals who went into alliance with the Conservatives. Simon found his constituency marginal, and had a majority of under 1,000 in his last election, and Labour gained it in the 1945 election landslide.

Boundary changes abolished the constituency in 1950. The bulk of the abolished constituency, including Cleckheaton, Gildersome and Spenborough, formed the eastern half of Brighouse and Spenborough; another large part including Gildersome, Birstall and Drighlington, formed part of Batley and Morley. Heckmondwike and Mirfield transferred to Dewsbury, while Kirkheaton moved to Colne Valley and other parts moved to Huddersfield East.

== Boundaries ==
=== 1885–1950 ===
While originally devised by the Boundary Commissioners in 1885, the division was originally named as 'Birstal', "from the name of a large ancient parish". The naming of the new division led to a small struggle between the two Houses of Parliament during the passage of the Redistribution of Seats Act 1885, when Alfred Illingworth (Liberal MP for Bradford) moved an amendment to replace 'Birstal' with 'Spen Valley'. Illingworth argued that Birstall contained only one-eighth of the population of the division, but Spen Valley was a name which represented several important towns, and his amendment was accepted without dissent by the House of Commons. When the Bill reached the House of Lords, the Conservative peer the Earl of Feversham moved an amendment to reinstate 'Birstal' claiming the support of the people in the area. The Earl contended that the Spen Valley was an unknown description and "was only remarkable for being the receptacle of all the sewage from Birstal", whereas Birstal was a very important parish. He had support from the Earl of Cranbrook and his amendment was also accepted without dissent.

When the Bill returned to the House of Commons, Alfred Illingworth again took up the issue and moved that the Commons disagree with the Lords. He again pointed to the small population of Birstall in comparison with other towns, and noted that the Sanitary district covering the area was known as Spen Valley and that the River Spen ran through the centre of the constituency whereas Birstall was in the extreme north-east corner of it. Conservative MP Edward Stanhope (Mid Lincolnshire) said that he had found feeling in the area to be in favour of 'Birstal', but the President of the Local Government Board Sir Charles Dilke, speaking for the Government, stated that the local boards in Heckmondwike, Liversedge and Cleckheaton (where a majority of the population lived) had sent a memorial in favour of 'Spen Valley'. He agreed that the name had been invented by the Local Government Board, but argued that there were "local jealousies" between the towns and that Birstall was unpopular with the others, and therefore personally supported 'Spen Valley'. After a brief debate, the House voted by 65 to 46 to insist on 'Spen Valley' as the name. The Lords then gave way, but not without further protest from the Earl of Feversham.

During this battle no alteration was made to the boundary. The new division was to consist of:

- the Parishes in the Sessional Division of Dewsbury of Gomersal, Heckmondwike and Liversedge, and
- the Parishes of Cleckheaton, Clifton, Hartshead, and Wyke.

When redefined by the Boundary Commission in 1917, the county division was defined as consisting of the Urban Districts of Birkenshaw, Birstall, Drighlington, Gildersome, Heckmondwike, Hunsworth, Kirkheaton, Lepton, Mirfield, Spenborough and Whitley Upper.

The effect of the boundary change in 1918 was as shown in the table:

Parish	1911 Population	1885–1918	1918–1950	Notes
Birkenshaw	2,508	Spen Valley	Spen Valley	Was part of Gomersal Parish in 1885
Birstall	7,116	Spen Valley	Spen Valley	Was part of Gomersal Parish in 1885
Cleckheaton	12,866	Spen Valley	Spen Valley	Part of Spenborough Urban District from 1915
Clifton	2,258	Spen Valley	Elland	
Drighlington	4,126	Pudsey	Spen Valley	
Gildersome	2,981	Pudsey	Spen Valley	
Gomersal	3,796	Spen Valley	Spen Valley	Included Birkenshaw and Birstall in 1885
Hartshead	958	Spen Valley	Elland	
Heckmondwike	9,016	Spen Valley	Spen Valley	
Hipperholme (part)	322	Spen Valley	Elland	Part of Wyke parish in 1885, removed in 1899
Hunsworth	1,326	Pudsey	Spen Valley	
Kirkheaton	2,621	Holmfirth	Spen Valley	
Lepton	2,999	Holmfirth	Spen Valley	
Liversedge	14,658	Spen Valley	Spen Valley	Part of Spenborough Urban District from 1915
Mirfield	11,712	Morley	Spen Valley	
Whitley Upper	830	Holmfirth	Spen Valley	
Wyke	6,145	Spen Valley	Bradford South	

Of the 59,643 population in Spen Valley before the boundary change, 49,960 (83.8%) remained in the division after it. 6,145 (10.3%) moved to Bradford South while 3,538 (5.9%) moved to Elland. The new constituency was made up primarily of the old Spen Valley (65.3%), with 11,712 (15.3%) from Morley, 8,433 (11.0%) from Pudsey, and 6,450 (8.4%) from Holmfirth.

=== 2024–present ===
Further to the 2023 periodic review of Westminster constituencies which came into effect for the 2024 general election, the re-established constituency comprises the following wards of the Borough of Kirklees:

- Birstall and Birkenshaw; Cleckheaton; Dalton (polling district DA06); Heckmondwike; Liversedge and Gomersal; Mirfield.

The majority of the electorate comes from the abolished seat of Batley and Spen – excluding the town of Batley itself. Mirfield was transferred in from the abolished Dewsbury constituency, and the small part of Dalton ward, which includes the village of Kirkheaton, from Huddersfield.

== Members of Parliament ==
=== MPs 1885–1950 ===
Eastern West Riding of Yorkshire prior to 1885

Election	Member	Party
1885	Joseph Woodhead	Liberal
1892	Thomas Whittaker	Liberal
1916	Thomas Whittaker	Coalition Liberal
1919 by-election	Tom Myers	Labour
1922	Sir John Simon	Liberal
1931	Sir John Simon	Liberal National
1940 by-election	William Woolley	Liberal National
1945	Granville Maynard Sharp	Labour
1950	Constituency abolished	

=== MPs since 2024 ===
Batley and Spen prior to 2024

Election	Member	Party
2024	Kim Leadbeater	Labour

== Elections ==
=== Elections in the 2020s ===
2024 general election: Spen Valley
Party	Candidate	Votes	%	±%
Labour	Kim Leadbeater	16,076	39.2	+5.7
Reform	Sarah Wood	9,888	24.1	+20.7
Conservative	Laura Evans	9,859	24.0	−22.4
Green	Martin Price	2,284	5.6	+3.8
Independent	Javed Bashir	1,526	3.7	N/A
Liberal Democrats	Alison Brelsford	1,425	3.5	−2.3
Majority		6,188	15.1	N/A
Turnout		41,058	56.5	−8.9
Registered electors		72,642		
Labour gain from Conservative		Swing	+14.1	

=== Elections in the 2010s ===
2019 notional result
Party	Vote	%
Conservative	21,886	46.4
Labour	15,822	33.5
Others	4,289	9.1
Liberal Democrats	2,755	5.8
Brexit Party	1,627	3.4
Green	830	1.8
Turnout	47,209	65.4
Electorate	72,169	

== Election results 1885–1950 ==
Spen Valley election results

=== Elections in the 1880s ===
1885 general election: Spen Valley
Party	Candidate	Votes	%	±%
Liberal	Joseph Woodhead	5,826	67.7	
Conservative	John Gladstone	2,782	32.3	
Majority		3,044	35.4	
Turnout		8,608	89.2	
Registered electors		9,645		
Liberal win (new seat)				

1886 general election: Spen Valley
Party	Candidate	Votes	%	±%
Liberal	Joseph Woodhead	4,542	67.4	−0.3
Liberal Unionist	Stanley Boulter	2,200	32.6	+0.3
Majority		2,342	34.8	−0.6
Turnout		6,742	69.9	−19.3
Registered electors		9,645		
Liberal hold				

=== Elections in the 1890s ===
Thomas Whittaker

1892 general election: Spen Valley
Party	Candidate	Votes	%	±%
Liberal	Thomas Whittaker	4,952	58.8	−8.6
Conservative	Frederick Ellis	3,474	41.2	+8.6
Majority		1,478	17.6	−17.2
Turnout		8,426	76.3	+6.4
Registered electors		11,038		
Liberal hold				

1895 general election: Spen Valley
Party	Candidate	Votes	%	±%
Liberal	Thomas Whittaker	4,700	54.8	−4.0
Conservative	Frederick Ellis	3,879	45.2	+4.0
Majority		821	9.6	−8.0
Turnout		8,579	81.8	+5.5
Registered electors		10,492		
Liberal hold				

=== Elections in the 1900s ===
1900 general election: Spen Valley
Party	Candidate	Votes	%	±%
Liberal	Thomas Whittaker	5,068	58.1	+3.3
Conservative	William Glossop	3,653	41.9	−3.3
Majority		1,415	16.2	+6.6
Turnout		8,721	80.3	−1.5
Registered electors		10,858		
Liberal hold				

1906 general election: Spen Valley
Party	Candidate	Votes	%	±%
Liberal	Thomas Whittaker	5,956	65.8	+7.7
Conservative	Richard Johnson	3,092	34.2	−7.7
Majority		2,864	31.6	+15.4
Turnout		9,048	80.1	−0.2
Registered electors		11,300		
Liberal hold				

=== Elections in the 1910s ===
January 1910 general election: Spen Valley
Party	Candidate	Votes	%	±%
Liberal	Thomas Whittaker	4,817	44.8	−21.0
Conservative	Frederic Kelley	3,439	31.9	−2.3
Labour	T. Russell Williams	2,514	23.3	N/A
Majority		1,378	12.9	−18.7
Turnout		10,770	92.6	+12.5
Registered electors		11,631		
Liberal hold				

December 1910 general election: Spen Valley
Party	Candidate	Votes	%	±%
Liberal	Thomas Whittaker	5,041	52.6	+7.8
Conservative	Frederic Kelley	4,545	47.4	+15.5
Majority		496	5.2	−7.7
Turnout		9,586	82.4	−10.2
Registered electors		11,631		
Liberal hold				

Note: Another General Election was required to take place before the end of 1915. The political parties had been making preparations for an election to take place and by July 1914, the following candidates had been selected:

- Liberal: Thomas Whittaker

1918 general election: Spen Valley
Party	Candidate	Votes	%	±%
National Liberal	Thomas Whittaker	10,664	55.6	+3.0
Labour	Tom Myers	8,508	44.4	New
Majority		2,156	11.2	+6.0
Turnout		19,172	50.2	−32.2
Registered electors		38,327		
National Liberal hold				

By-election, 20 December 1919: Spen Valley
Party	Candidate	Votes	%	±%
Labour	Tom Myers	11,962	39.4	−5.0
Liberal	John Simon	10,244	33.8	N/A
National Liberal	Bryan Charles Fairfax	8,134	26.8	−28.8
Majority		1,718	5.6	N/A
Turnout		30,340	76.5	+26.3
Registered electors		39,667		
Labour gain from National Liberal		Swing		

=== Elections in the 1920s ===
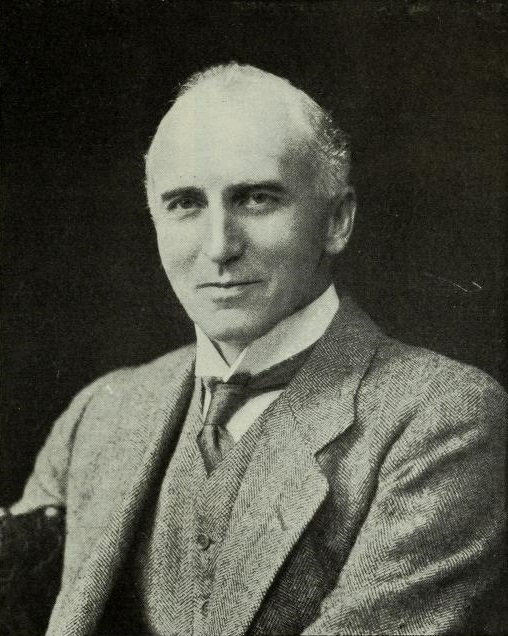
John Simon

1922 general election: Spen Valley
Party	Candidate	Votes	%	±%
Liberal	John Simon	13,306	39.2	N/A
Labour	Tom Myers	12,519	36.9	−7.5
Conservative	William Orlando Rhodes Holton	8,104	23.9	N/A
Majority		787	2.3	N/A
Turnout		33,929	84.6	+34.4
Registered electors		40,107		
Liberal gain from National Liberal		Swing		

1923 general election: Spen Valley
Party	Candidate	Votes	%	±%
Liberal	John Simon	13,672	40.6	+1.4
Labour	Tom Myers	12,597	37.4	+0.5
Conservative	Eugene Ramsden	7,390	22.0	−1.9
Majority		1,075	3.2	+0.9
Turnout		33,659	82.7	−1.9
Registered electors		40,678		
Liberal hold		Swing		

1924 general election: Spen Valley
Party	Candidate	Votes	%	±%
Liberal	John Simon	18,474	56.9	+16.3
Labour	Tom Myers	13,999	43.1	+5.7
Majority		4,475	13.8	+10.6
Turnout		32,473	79.2	−3.5
Registered electors		40,978		
Liberal hold		Swing		

1929 general election: Spen Valley
Party	Candidate	Votes	%	±%
Liberal	John Simon	22,039	51.7	−5.2
Labour	Herbert Elvin	20,300	47.7	+4.6
Communist	Shaukat Usmani	242	0.6	New
Majority		1,739	4.0	−9.8
Turnout		42,581	79.6	+0.4
Registered electors		53,480		
Liberal hold		Swing		

=== Elections in the 1930s ===
1931 general election: Spen Valley
Party	Candidate	Votes	%	±%
National Liberal	John Simon	28,647	64.6	+12.9
Labour	Herbert Elvin	15,691	35.4	−12.3
Majority		12,956	29.2	+25.2
Turnout		44,338	82.0	+2.4
Registered electors		54,097		
National Liberal hold		Swing	+12.9	

1935 general election: Spen Valley
Party	Candidate	Votes	%	±%
National Liberal	John Simon	21,671	50.8	−13.8
Labour	Ivor Thomas	21,029	49.2	+13.8
Majority		642	1.6	−27.6
Turnout		42,700	77.1	−4.9
Registered electors		55,358		
National Liberal hold		Swing	–13.8	

Note: Another General Election was required to take place before the end of 1940. The political parties had been making preparations for an election to take place and by the Autumn of 1939, the following candidates had been selected:

- Liberal National: William Woolley
- Labour: Ivor Thomas

=== Elections in the 1940s ===
1 June 1940 by-election: Spen Valley
Party	Candidate	Votes	%	±%
National Liberal	William Woolley	Unopposed		
National Liberal hold				

1945 general election: Spen Valley
Party	Candidate	Votes	%	±%
Labour	Granville Sharp	25,698	56.7	+7.5
National Liberal	William Woolley	19,621	43.3	−7.5
Majority		6,077	13.4	N/A
Turnout		45,319	82.1	+5.0
Registered electors		55,218		
Labour gain from National Liberal		Swing	+7.5	

== See also ==
- List of parliamentary constituencies in West Yorkshire
- List of parliamentary constituencies in the Yorkshire and the Humber (region)
- Spenborough

Parliament of the United Kingdom
Preceded by Birmingham Edgbaston	Constituency represented by the chancellor of the Exchequer; 1937–1940	Succeeded by Woolwich West
