= John Simon, 1st Viscount Simon =

British politician and Lord Chancellor (1873–1954)

The Right Honourable The Viscount Simon GCSI GCVO OBE PC KC
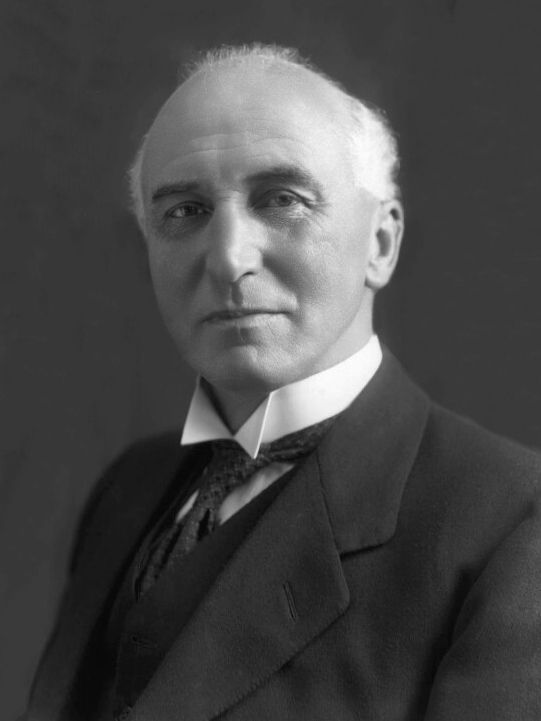
- Simon in 1931

Lord Chancellor
- In office 10 May 1940 – 27 July 1945
- Monarch: George VI
- Prime Minister: Winston Churchill
- Preceded by: The Viscount Caldecote
- Succeeded by: The Lord Jowitt

Chancellor of the Exchequer
- In office 28 May 1937 – 10 May 1940
- Prime Minister: Neville Chamberlain
- Preceded by: Neville Chamberlain
- Succeeded by: Sir Kingsley Wood

Foreign Secretary
- In office 5 November 1931 – 7 June 1935
- Prime Minister: Ramsay MacDonald
- Preceded by: The Marquess of Reading
- Succeeded by: Sir Samuel Hoare

Home Secretary
- In office 7 June 1935 – 28 May 1937
- Prime Minister: Stanley Baldwin
- Preceded by: Sir John Gilmour
- Succeeded by: Sir Samuel Hoare
- In office 27 May 1915 – 12 January 1916
- Prime Minister: H. H. Asquith
- Preceded by: Reginald McKenna
- Succeeded by: Herbert Samuel

Attorney General for England and Wales
- In office 19 October 1913 – 25 May 1915
- Prime Minister: H. H. Asquith
- Preceded by: Sir Rufus Isaacs
- Succeeded by: Sir Edward Carson

Solicitor General for England and Wales
- In office 7 October 1910 – 19 October 1913
- Prime Minister: H. H. Asquith
- Preceded by: Sir Rufus Isaacs
- Succeeded by: Sir Stanley Buckmaster

Member of the House of Lords Lord Temporal
- In office 20 May 1940 – 11 January 1954; Hereditary peerage
- Preceded by: Peerage created
- Succeeded by: The 2nd Viscount Simon

Member of Parliament for Spen Valley
- In office 15 November 1922 – 1 June 1940
- Preceded by: Tom Myers
- Succeeded by: William Woolley

Member of Parliament for Walthamstow
- In office 8 February 1906 – 14 December 1918
- Preceded by: David John Morgan
- Succeeded by: Seat abolished

Personal details
- Born: John Allsebrook Simon; 28 February 1873 Moss Side, Manchester, Lancashire, England
- Died: 11 January 1954 (aged 80) Westminster, London, England
- Party: Liberal Party
- Other political affiliations: National Liberal Party
- Spouses: Ethel Venables (m. 1899; died 1902); Kathleen Rochard Manning (m. 1917)
- Education: Wadham College, Oxford

John Allsebrook Simon, 1st Viscount Simon, GCSI, GCVO, OBE, PC (28 February 1873 – 11 January 1954) was a British politician who held senior Cabinet posts from the beginning of the First World War to the end of the Second World War. He is one of three people to have served as Home Secretary, Foreign Secretary and Chancellor of the Exchequer, the others being Rab Butler and James Callaghan.

He also served as Lord Chancellor, the most senior position in the British legal system. Beginning his career as a Liberal, he joined the National Government in 1931, creating the Liberal National Party in the process.

== Background and education ==
Simon was born in a terraced house on Moss Side, Manchester, the eldest child and only son of Edwin Simon (1843–1920) and wife Fanny Allsebrook (1846–1936). His father was a Congregationalist minister, like three of his five brothers, and was pastor of Zion Chapel in Hulme, Manchester. His mother was a farmer's daughter and a descendant of Sir Richard Pole and his wife, Margaret Pole, Countess of Salisbury.

Congregational ministers were expected to move about the country. Simon was educated at King Edward's School, Bath, as his father was President of Somerset Congregational Union. He was then a scholar of Fettes College in Edinburgh, where he was Head of School and won many prizes.

He failed to win a scholarship to Balliol College, Oxford, but won an open scholarship to Wadham College, Oxford. He arrived at Wadham in 1892. He achieved Seconds in Mathematics and Classical Moderations. He spoke in support of Herbert Samuel for South Oxfordshire in the 1895 election and, after two terms as Junior Treasurer, became President of the Oxford Union in Hilary Term 1896, Simon won the Barstow Law Scholarship and graduated with a first in Greats in 1896.

Simon's attendance at Wadham overlapped with those of F. E. Smith, the cricketer C. B. Fry and the journalist Francis Hirst. Smith, Fry and Simon played in the Wadham Rugby XV together. Simon and Smith began a rivalry that lasted throughout their legal and political careers over the next 30 years. Simon was, in David Dutton's view, a finer scholar than Smith. Although Smith thought Simon pompous, Simon, in the words of a contemporary, thought that Smith excelled at "the cheap score". A famous (although clearly untrue) malicious story had it that Smith and Simon had tossed a coin to decide which party to join.

Simon was briefly a trainee leader writer for the Manchester Guardian under C. P. Scott. Simon shared lodgings with Leo Amery while both were studying for the All Souls Fellowship (both were successful). He became a Fellow of All Souls in 1897.

Simon left Oxford at the end of 1898 and was called to the bar at the Inner Temple in 1899. He was a pupil of A. J. Ram and then of Sir Reginald Acland. Like many barristers, his career got off to a slow start: he earned a mere £27 in his first year at the bar. At first, he earned some extra money by coaching candidates for the bar exams. As a barrister, he relied on logic and reason rather than oratory and histrionics, and he excelled at simplifying complex issues. He was a brilliant advocate of complex cases before judges although rather less so before juries. Some of his work was done on the Western Circuit at Bristol. He worked exceptionally hard, often preparing his cases through the night several times a week. His initial lack of connections made his eventual success at the Bar all the more impressive.

Simon was widowed in 1902 and took solace in his work. He became a successful lawyer, and in 1903, he acted for the British government in the Alaska boundary dispute. Even three years after his wife's death, he spent Christmas Day 1905 alone by walking aimlessly in France.

== Early political career ==
Simon entered the House of Commons as a Liberal Member of Parliament (MP) for Walthamstow at the 1906 general election. In 1908, he became a KC (senior barrister) at the same time as F. E. Smith. Simon annoyed Smith by not telling his rival in advance that he was applying for silk.

In 1909, Simon spoke out strongly in parliament in support of David Lloyd George's progressive "People's Budget". He entered the government on 7 October 1910 as solicitor-general, succeeding Rufus Isaacs, and was knighted later that month, as was then usual for government law officers (Asquith brushed aside his objections). At 37, he was the youngest solicitor-general since the 1830s. In February 1911, he successfully prosecuted Edward Mylius for criminal libel for claiming that King George V was a bigamist. As was then required by the law, he fought a by-election after his appointment.

He was honoured with appointment as a KCVO in 1911. Asquith referred to him as "the Impeccable" for his intellectual self-assurance, but after a series of social encounters, he wrote that "The Impeccable" was becoming "The Inevitable".

Along with Isaacs, Simon represented the Board of Trade at the public inquiry into the sinking of the RMS Titanic in 1912; their close questioning of witnesses helped to prepare the way for improved maritime safety measures. Unusually for a government law officer, he was active in partisan political debate. When F. E. Smith first spoke from the Conservative front bench in 1912, Simon was put up next to oppose his old rival. He was promoted on 19 October 1913 to attorney-general, again succeeding Isaacs. Unusually for an attorney-general, he was made a full member of Cabinet, as Isaacs had been, rather than simply being invited to attend when he was required. He was already being tipped as a potential future Liberal prime minister.

Simon supported social reforms related to social security.

He was the leader of the (unsuccessful) cabinet rebels against Winston Churchill's 1914 naval estimates. Asquith thought that Simon had organised "a conclave of malcontents" (Lloyd George, Reginald McKenna, Samuel, Charles Hobhouse and Beauchamp). He wrote to Asquith that the "loss of WC, though regrettable, is not by any means the splitting of the party". Lloyd George referred to Simon as "a kind of Robespierre".

Simon contemplated resigning in protest at the declaration of war in August 1914 but, in the end, changed his mind. He was accused of hypocrisy even though his position was not actually very different from that of Lloyd George. He remained in the Cabinet after Asquith reminded him of his public duty and hinted at promotion. He damaged himself in the eyes of Hobhouse (postmaster-general), Charles Masterman and the journalist C. P. Scott. Roy Jenkins believed that Simon was genuinely opposed to war.

Early in 1915, Asquith rated Simon as "equal seventh" in his score list of the Cabinet, after his "malaise of last autumn".

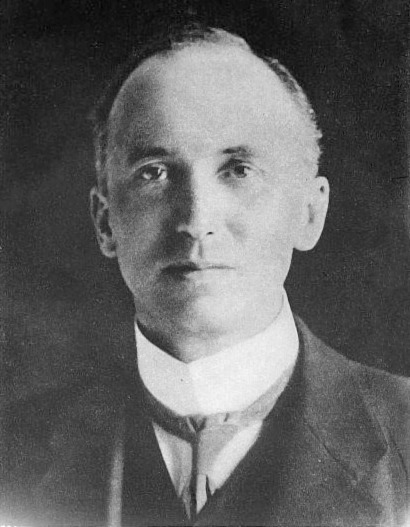
Simon circa 1916

== First World War ==
On 25 May 1915, Simon became Home Secretary in Asquith's new coalition government. He declined an offer of the job of Lord Chancellor, which would have meant going to the Lords and restricting his active political career thereafter. As home secretary, he satisfied nobody. He tried to defend the Union of Democratic Control against Edward Carson's attempt to prosecute it. However, he tried to ban The Times and the Daily Mail for criticising the government's conduct of the war but failed to obtain Cabinet support.

He resigned in January 1916 in protest against the introduction of conscription of single men, which he thought a breach of Liberal principles. McKenna and Walter Runciman also opposed conscription but for different reasons: they thought that it would weaken British industry and wanted Britain to concentrate her war effort on the Royal Navy and supporting the other Allies with finance. In his memoirs, Simon would admit that his resignation from the Home Office had been a mistake.

In August 1916, Simon became chairman of the Royal Commission on the Arrest... and Subsequent Treatment of Francis Sheehy-Skeffington, Thomas Dickson and Patrick James McIntyre. The Commission published its report in September but without the evidential proceedings.

After Asquith's fall in December 1916, Simon remained in opposition as an Asquithian Liberal.

Simon proved his patriotism by serving as an officer on Trenchard's staff in the Royal Flying Corps for about a year, starting in the summer of 1917. His duties included purchasing supplies in Paris, where he married his second wife towards the end of 1917. Amidst questions as to whether it was appropriate for a serving officer to do so, Simon spoke in Trenchard's defence in Parliament when Trenchard resigned as Chief of Air Staff after Trenchard had fallen out with the President of the Air Council Lord Rothermere, who soon resigned. However, Simon was attacked in the Northcliffe Press (Northcliffe was Rothermere's brother).

Simon's Walthamstow constituency was split up at the "Coupon Election" in 1918 and he was defeated at the new Walthamstow East division by a margin of more than 4,000 votes.

== 1920s ==
=== Out of Parliament ===
In 1919, he attempted to return to Parliament at the Spen Valley by-election. Lloyd George put up a coalition Liberal candidate in Spen Valley to keep Simon out and was active behind the scenes trying to see him defeated.

Although the Coalition Liberals, who had formerly held the seat, were pushed into third place, Simon came second; in the view of Maurice Cowling (The Impact of Labour 1920-4), his defeat by Labour marked the point at which Labour began to be seen as a serious threat by the older political parties.

=== Deputy leader of Liberals ===
In the early 1920s, he practised successfully at the bar before being elected for Spen Valley at the general election in 1922, and from 1922 to 1924, he served as deputy leader of the Liberal Party (under Asquith). In the early 1920s, he spoke in the House of Commons about socialism, the League of Nations, unemployment and Ireland. He may well have hoped to succeed Asquith as Liberal leader. He retired temporarily from the Bar around then.

In October 1924, Simon moved the amendment that brought down the first Labour government. At that year's general election, the Conservatives were returned to power, and the Liberals were reduced to a rump of just over 40 MPs. Although Asquith, who had lost his seat, remained leader of the party, Lloyd George was elected chairman of the Liberal MPs by 29 votes to 9. Simon abstained in the vote. By this time he was increasingly anti-socialist and quite friendly to the Conservative leader Stanley Baldwin and clashed increasingly with Lloyd George. He stood down as deputy leader and returned to the Bar.

=== General strike and Simon Commission ===
Unlike Lloyd George, Simon opposed the 1926 general strike. On 6 May, the fourth day of the strike, he declared in the House of Commons that the strike was illegal and argued that it was not entitled to the legal privileges of the Trade Disputes Act 1906 and that the union bosses would be "liable to the utmost farthing" in damages for the harm that they inflicted on businesses and for inciting the men to break their contracts of employment. Simon was highly respected as an authority on the law but was neither popular nor seen as a political leader. Trade Union historian Henry Pelling comments that Simon's speech was clearly intended to intimidate, but had little effect. A few days later he was answered by Labour’s Sir Henry Slesser, who argued that a strike was only illegal if it could be proven to be a seditious conspiracy against the state. Pelling believes that Slesser was right as sympathetic strikes were not explicitly made illegal until the Trade Disputes and Trade Unions Act 1927.

Simon was then one of the highest-paid barristers of his generation and was believed to earn between £36,000 and £70,000 per annum (equivalent to £3,700,000 in 2025). It seemed for a while that he might abandon politics altogether. Simon spoke for the Dominion of Newfoundland in the Labrador boundary dispute with Canada before he announced his permanent retirement from the Bar.

From 1927 to 1931, he chaired the Indian Constitutional Development Committee or the Indian Statutory Commission, known as the Simon Commission, on the constitution of India.

Upon the commission's arrival in Bombay in February 1928, it was immediately met with a hartal and protestors holding black flags and banners reading "Simon Go Back" (coined by Yusuf Meherally) involving prominent Indian political leaders such as Lala Lajpat Rai and Tanguturi Prakasam. The protests erupted due to the lack of Indian representation on the commission, with the group composed of seven all-British Members of Parliament.

His personality was already something of an issue: Neville Chamberlain wrote of him to the Viceroy of India Lord Irwin (12 August 1928): "I am always trying to like him, and believing I shall succeed when something crops up to put me off". Dutton describes Simon's eventual report as a "lucid exposition of the problems of the subcontinent in all their complexity". However, Simon had been hampered by the inquiry's terms of reference (no Indians had been included on the committee), and his conclusions were overshadowed by the Irwin Declaration of October 1929, which Simon opposed, which promised India eventual dominion status. Simon was appointed GCSI 1930.

=== Liberal National split and moving towards Conservatives ===
Before serving on the committee, Simon had obtained a guarantee that he would not be opposed by a Conservative candidate at Spen Valley at the 1929 general election, and, indeed he was never again opposed by a Conservative. During the late 1920s and especially during the 1929-31 Parliament, in which Labour had no majority but continued in office with the help of the Liberals, Simon was seen as the leader of the minority of Liberal MPs who disliked Lloyd George's inclination to support Labour, rather than the Conservatives. Simon still supported free trade during the 1929-31 Parliament.

In 1930, Simon headed the official inquiry into the R101 airship disaster.

In June 1931, before the formation of the National Government, Simon resigned the Liberal whip. In September, Simon and his 30-or-so followers became the Liberal Nationals (later renamed the "National Liberals") and increasingly aligned themselves with the Conservatives for practical purposes. Simon was accused by Lloyd George of leaving "the slime of hypocrisy" as he crossed the floor (on another occasion, Lloyd George is said to have commented that he had "sat on the fence so long the iron has entered into his soul", but this quote is more difficult to verify).

== 1930s: National Government ==
=== Foreign Secretary ===
Simon was not initially included in Ramsay MacDonald's National Government, which was formed in August 1931. Simon offered to give up his seat at Spen Valley to MacDonald if the latter had trouble holding Seaham (MacDonald held the seat in 1931 but lost it in 1935). On 5 November 1931, Simon was appointed Foreign Secretary when the National Government was reconstituted. The appointment was at first greeted with acclaim. Simon's Liberal Nationals continued to support protectionism and Ramsay MacDonald's National Government after the departure of the mainstream Liberals, led by Herbert Samuel, who left the government in 1932 and formally went into Opposition in November 1933.

Simon's tenure of office saw a number of important events in foreign policy, including the Japanese invasion of Manchuria, which had begun in September 1931, before he had taken office. Simon attracted particular opprobrium for his speech to the General Assembly of the League of Nations at Geneva on 7 December 1932 in which he failed to denounce Japan unequivocally. Thereafter, Simon was known as the "Man of Manchukuo" and was compared unfavourably to the young Anthony Eden, who was popular at Geneva. Simon was excellent in offering up an analysis of a problem in which he would lay out the advantages and disadvantages of each option, but he had much difficulty in choosing which one to select, much to the vexation of Eden who complained "he expects the Cabinet to find his policy for him-Poor Simon is no fighter. Nothing will make him into one". Simon's inability to choose an option reflected his background as a lawyer where he would lay out all the possible options for his client, who would then choose which option to pursue.

The British historian David Dutton wrote that some of the attacks on Simon's handling of the Japanese conquest of Manchuria were not fair in the sense that everything is put down to Simon's supposed personal weaknesses rather than to the so-called Ten Year Rule instituted in 1919 by the War Secretary Winston Churchill which stated that British defence spending was to be based on the assumption that there would be no major war in the next ten years. As a result of the Ten Year Rule, Britain did not have sufficient military forces to face Japan, most notably as Singapore Naval Base, begun in 1921, was still under construction. Simon's tendency to equivocate with regard to Manchuria and his suggestions that more research was needed to establish whether Japan had committed aggression or not was a way of covering up the fact that Britain was not capable of fighting a major war in 1931-1932. In particular, Simon's equivocating was to cover up the fact that the much vaulted Singapore strategy was a sham as the Singapore naval base would not be finished until 1938. Moreover, although the League of Nations' collective security doctrine should had required the other members of the League to respond to an act of aggression against China, there was little support in Britain in 1931 for going to war against Japan for the sake of a Chinese province of whose existence many people only learned of when Japan seized it. Adding to the charge against Simon was the claim that the administration of Herbert Hoover wanted to have the United States act against Japan and that Simon spurred the American offer. The historian A. L. Rowse, who belonged to the "guilty men" school of historiography and who tended to be very harsh in his writings towards Simon, conceded that this claim that Simon rejected American offers in 1931-1932 to take joint action against Japan was a myth, apparently invented by American historians to explain why the United States was not more forceful in responding to Japan's aggression.

However, it is true that in January 1932 Simon rejected an offer by the American Secretary of State Henry L. Stimson calling for a joint Anglo-American declaration stating that they would never establish diplomatic relations with the sham state of Manchukuo, which was viewed in Japan as a pro-Japanese gesture that reflected a quiet sympathy for Japan's actions. Japanese diplomats and generals believed that Britain could be persuaded to accept Manchukuo in exchange for a promise that Japan would support Britain in upholding its extraterritorial rights in China, and that there was no prospect of any British action against Japan as long as Simon remained Foreign Secretary. Japanese diplomats viewed Labour and the Liberals as the "anti-Japanese" parties committed to the League of Nations while the Conservatives were viewed as the "pro-Japanese" imperialist party committed to realpolitik in upholding the British empire in Asia. Though Simon was a Liberal, he was felt in Japan to be closer to the Conservatives in his views. The repeated demands by the Chinese for the abolition of all the extraterritorial rights in China held by foreign powers gained via the so-called "unequal treaties" in the 19th century was felt in Japan to be the basis of a common Anglo-Japanese front against China that would ultimately lead to Britain recognising Manchukuo.

At the same time, Adolf Hitler was coming to power in Germany in January 1933. Hitler immediately withdrew Germany from the League of Nations and announced a programme of rearmament, initially to give Germany armed forces commensurate with France and other powers. Simon did not foresee the sheer scale of Hitler's ambitions, but Dutton pointed out, the same was then true for many others.

Simon's term of office also saw the failure of the World Disarmament Conference (1932-1934). His contribution was not entirely in vain since he proposed qualitative (seeking to limit or ban certain types of weapon), rather than quantitative (simple numbers of weapons), disarmament.

Simon does not appear to have been considered for the post of Chancellor of Oxford University in succession to Viscount Grey in 1933 since Simon was then at the depth of his unpopularity as Foreign Secretary. Lord Irwin was elected, and since he lived until 1959, the job did not fall vacant again in Simon's lifetime.

There was talk of Neville Chamberlain, who dominated the government's domestic policy, becoming Foreign Secretary, but that would have been intolerable to MacDonald, who took a keen interest in foreign affairs and wanted a leading non-Conservative in that role. In 1933 and late 1934, Simon was being criticised by both Austen and Neville Chamberlain as well as by Eden, Lloyd George, Nancy Astor, David Margesson, Vincent Massey, Runciman, Jan Smuts and Churchill. In March 1935, Simon visited Berlin to meet Adolf Hitler at the Reich Chancellery. Just before departing, Simon told King George V that he believed the repudiation of Part V of the Treaty of Versailles (the section of the treaty dealing with the military disarmament of Germany) was the beginning, and that he felt likely that Hitler also wanted the remilitarisation of the Rhineland, the repudiation of Part VI of the Treaty of Versailles (the section dealing with the naval disarmament of Germany) along with the return of the Free City of Danzig (modern Gdańsk), Memel (modern Klaipėda), and the former German colonies in Africa. Simon reported after his meeting in the Reich Chancellery that Hitler's foreign policy was "very dangerous for the peace of Europe" and the results might be "terrible beyond conception". However, Simon stated that thinking along these lines was "pretty hopeless" and resolved to keep to press for Germany to return to the World Disarmament Conference, which had abjured in 1934, and the League of Nations. Because the rules of the League of Nations forbade member nations from attacking each other, Simon attached enormous symbolic significance to a German return to the League as a symbol of Germany's willingness to be a responsible member of the international system.

Simon accompanied MacDonald to negotiate the Stresa Front with France and Italy in April 1935, but it was MacDonald who took the lead in the negotiations. Simon himself did not think that Stresa would stop German rearmament – indeed, he told the House of Commons in 1934 that Germany's rearmament was "vital to peace" – but thought that it might be a useful deterrent against territorial aggression by Hitler. The first stirrings of Italian aggression towards Abyssinia (now Ethiopia) were also then seen. During Simon's tenure of the Foreign Office, British defence strength was at its lowest point of the interwar period, which severely limited his freedom of action.

Even Simon's colleagues thought that he had been a disastrous Foreign Secretary, "the worst since Æthelred the Unready", as one wag put it. He was better at analysing a problem than at concluding and acting. Jenkins commented that he was a bad Foreign Secretary in the view of his contemporaries and ever since and concurs that he was better at analysing than solving. Neville Chamberlain thought he always sounded as though he was speaking from a brief. Simon's officials despaired of him since he had few thoughts of his own, solutions were imposed on him by others and he defended them only weakly. Leo Amery was a rare defender of Simon's record: in 1937, he recorded that Simon "really had been a sound foreign minister – and Stresa marked the nearest Europe has been to peace since 1914".

=== Home Secretary ===
Simon served as Home Secretary (in Stanley Baldwin's Third Government) from 7 June 1935 to 28 May 1937. That position was in Dutton's view better suited to his abilities than the Foreign Office. He also became Deputy Leader of the House of Commons on the understanding that the latter position would be given to Neville Chamberlain after the election (in the event, it was not). In 1936 Simon was the last Home Secretary to attend a royal birth (of Princess Alexandra of Kent).

==== The Battle of Cable Street ====
In 1936 – despite pressure from the former Labour leader and MP George Lansbury, as well as from mayors of five East London Boroughs (Hackney, Shoreditch, Stepney, Bethnal Green and Poplar) and a 100,000 signature-strong petition from local East Londoners (organised by the Jewish People's Council) – the then-home secretary Simon refused to ban a march organised by the British Union of Fascists (BUF) through the then predominantly Jewish East End of London. The BUF's announcement of this large-scale march was widely regarded "an act of provocation (...) aimed at (...) Jews and Communists". The ensuing events have since become known as the Battle of Cable Street.

Two days after the event, the Labour Party Annual Conference denounced Sir John Simon for not banning the march and articulated a need for legislation. While the ensuing Public Order Act 1936 did successfully restrict politically extremist movements, it was nevertheless criticised for handing significant powers to the police to determine the routes of marches and processions. The Public Order act's legacy remains mixed and its authorship is contested, but records show that Simon did commend the bill to the house.

==== Other issues ====
Simon also played a key role behind the scenes in the 1936 Abdication Crisis. In 2013 it was revealed that he was so worried about the behaviour of King Edward VIII that he ordered the bugging of his telephone line.

He was one of the signatories to the Anglo-Egyptian Treaty of 1936. He also introduced the Factories Act 1937.

Simon also supported housing reform.

=== Chancellor of the Exchequer ===
==== Peace ====
In 1937, Neville Chamberlain succeeded Baldwin as prime minister. Simon succeeded Chamberlain as Chancellor of the Exchequer and was raised to GCVO in 1937. As Chancellor, he tried to keep arms spending as low as possible in the belief that a strong economy was the "fourth arm of defence". In 1937, he presented a finance bill that was based on the budget that Chamberlain had drawn up before being promoted.

In 1938, public expenditure passed the previously unthinkable level of £1,000m for the first time. In the spring 1938 budget, Simon raised the income tax from 5s to 5s 6d and increased duties on tea and petrol.

Simon had become a close political ally of Chamberlain and flattered him a great deal. In the autumn of 1938, he led the Cabinet to Heston Airport to wish him God speed on his flight to meet Hitler, and he helped to persuade Chamberlain to make the "high" case for Munich: that he had achieved a lasting peace, rather than that he had only limited potential damage. He retained the support of Chamberlain until around the middle of 1939.

In the spring 1939 budget, income tax was unchanged, and the surtax was increased, as were indirect taxes on cars, sugar and tobacco. It was not a war budget even though Hitler had already broken the Munich Accords by occupying Prague.

==== War ====
On 2 September 1939, Simon led a deputation of ministers to see Chamberlain to insist for Britain to honour her guarantee to Poland and go to war if Hitler did not withdraw. Simon became a member of the small War Cabinet.

On the outbreak of war, the pound sterling was devalued, with very little attention, from $4.89 to $4.03. At the emergency budget of September 1939, public expenditure had passed £2,000m; income tax was increased from 5s 6d (27.5%) to 7s 6d (37.5%); duties on alcohol, petrol and sugar were hiked; and a 60% tax on excess profits was introduced.

Simon's political position weakened as he came to be seen as a symbol of foot-dragging and the lack of commitment to total war. Along with Labour's dislike of Chamberlain, he was used as an excuse by the opposition parties for not joining the government on the outbreak of war. Archibald Sinclair, the leader of the "official" Liberal Party, said that for over seven years, Simon had been "the evil genius of British foreign policy". Hugh Dalton and Clement Attlee were very critical of Simon, as were many government backbenchers.

Chamberlain privately told colleagues that he found Simon "very much deteriorated". Simon's position weakened after Churchill rejoined the Cabinet on the outbreak of war and got on surprisingly well with Chamberlain, who toyed with the idea of replacing Simon with former Chancellor Reginald McKenna (then aged 76) or Lord Stamp, the chairman of the LMS Railway who had a secret meeting at Downing Street about the position. Even Captain Margesson, the Chief Whip, fancied his chances for the position.

Simon's last budget, in April 1940, saw public spending pass £2,700m, 46% of which was paid for from taxation and the rest from borrowing. Simon's April 1940 budget kept income tax at 7s 6d; a Punch cartoon expressed a widely-held view that it should have been increased to 10s (50%). Tax allowances were increased. Postal charges were increased, as were charges on tobacco, matches and alcohol. The purchase tax, an ancestor of today's value-added tax (VAT), was introduced.

In April 1940, he rejected John Maynard Keynes' idea of a forced loan, a tax disguised as a compulsory purchase of government securities. Keynes wrote a coruscating letter of rebuke to The Times. Simon found himself criticised, from opposite ends of the spectrum, by Leo Amery and Aneurin Bevan.

== Lord Chancellor ==
In May 1940, following the Norway Debate, Simon urged Chamberlain to stand firm as Prime Minister although Simon offered to resign and take Samuel Hoare with him. By 1940, Simon, along with his successor as Foreign Secretary, Hoare, had come to be seen as one of the "Guilty Men" responsible for appeasement of the dictators, and like Hoare, Simon was not regarded as acceptable in the War Cabinet of Churchill's new coalition. Hugh Dalton thought Simon "the snakiest of the lot".

Simon became Lord Chancellor in Churchill's government but without a place on the War Cabinet. Attlee commented that he "will be quite innocuous" in the role. On 13 May 1940, he was created Viscount Simon, of Stackpole Elidor in the County of Pembroke, a village from which his father traced descent.

In Dutton's view, of all the senior positions which he held, that was the one for which he was most suited. As Lord Chancellor, he delivered important judgements on the damages due for death caused by negligence and on how the judge ought to direct the jury in a murder trial if a possible defence of manslaughter arose. In 1943 alone, he delivered 43 major judgements on complex cases. RVF Heuston (Lives of the Lord Chancellors) described him as a "superb" Lord Chancellor. Jenkins comments that it is even more impressive in that many senior judges had over 20 years' experience at that level, whereas Simon had been retired from the law since 1928.

Simon interrogated Rudolf Hess, who had flown to Scotland, and also chaired the Royal Commission on the Birthrate.

In May 1945, after the end of the wartime coalition, Simon continued as Lord Chancellor but was not included in the Cabinet of the short-lived Churchill caretaker ministry. After Churchill's defeat in the 1945 general election, Simon never held office again.

== Later life ==
Although he had won plaudits for his legal skills as Lord Chancellor, Clement Attlee declined to appoint him to the British delegation at the Nuremberg War Trials and told him bluntly in a letter that Simon's role in the pre-war governments made it unwise. Simon remained active in the House of Lords and as a senior judge on the Judicial Committee of the Privy Council. He wrote a well-regarded practitioners' text Simon on Income Tax in 1948. During the drafting of the Criminal Justice Act 1948, it was Simon who proposed the eventual insertion of the abolition of the privilege of peerage for criminal courts.

In 1948, Simon succeeded Lord Sankey as High Steward of Oxford University. The position is often held by a distinguished Oxonian lawyer. Relations with his nearly-alcoholic wife were somewhat strained, and he increasingly spent his weekends at All Souls, of which he was Senior Fellow.

Simon was a vigorous campaigner against socialism, across the country in the general elections of 1945, 1950 and 1951. Churchill blocked Simon, who had stepped down as leader of the National Liberals in 1940, from joining the Conservative Party. Churchill was keen to lend Conservative support to the (official) Liberals, including his old friend Lady Violet Bonham Carter, but blocked a full merger between the Conservatives and the National Liberals although a constituency-level merger was negotiated with the Conservative Party chairman Lord Woolton in 1947 (thereafter, the National Liberals were increasingly absorbed into the Conservatives for practical purposes until they fully merged in 1968).

Although Simon was still physically and mentally vigorous (aged 78) when the Conservatives returned to power in 1951, Churchill offered him neither a return to the Woolsack nor any other office. In 1952, Simon published his memoirs, Retrospect. Harold Nicolson reviewed the book as describing the "nectarines and peaches of office" as if they were "a bag of prunes".

Simon died from a stroke on 11 January 1954. He was an atheist and was cremated in his Oxford robes. His estate was valued for probate at £93,006 12s (equivalent to £2,200,000 in 2025). Despite his huge earnings at the Bar, he was not particularly greedy for money and was generous to All Souls, to junior barristers and to the children of friends. His personal papers are preserved in the Bodleian Library, Oxford.

== Private life and personality ==
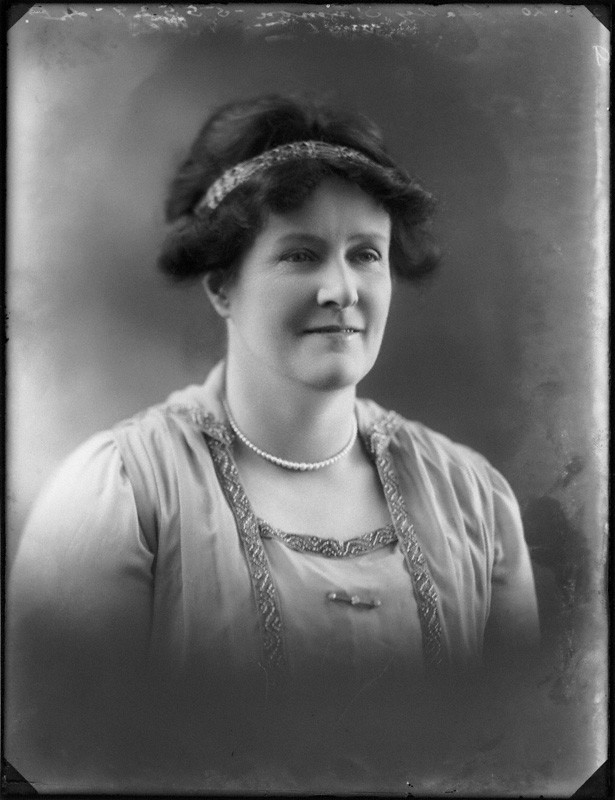
Dame Kathleen Simon, Viscountess Simon (17 February 1920)

Simon married Ethel Mary Venables, a niece of the historian J. R. Green, on 24 May 1899 in Headington, Oxfordshire. They had three children: Margaret (born 1900, who later married Geoffrey Edwards), Joan (born 1901, who later married John Bickford-Smith) and John Gilbert, 2nd Viscount Simon (1902–1993). Ethel died soon after the birth of their son Gilbert, in September 1902.

There are some suggestions that his first wife's death may have been caused by misguided use of homeopathic medicines, which added to Simon's guilt. In Jenkins' view, widowerhood, although common for politicians of the era, may have affected Simon's cold personality. He later apparently tried to persuade Margaret Greville, the hostess of Polesden Lacey, to marry him. Greville later claimed that he had told her that he would marry the next woman he met.

In 1917, in Paris, Simon married the abolition activist Kathleen Manning (1869–1955), a widow with one adult son, who had for a while been governess to his children. Her social gaucheness and inability to play the part of a great lady caused embarrassment on the Simon Commission in the late 1920s, and Neville Chamberlain found her "a sore trial". She had increasing health problems and "dr[ank] to excess" as she grew older. Jenkins wrote that she was tactless and, by the late 1930s, had become a virtual alcoholic but that Simon treated her with "tolerance and kindness". In 1938, Simon stepped down at Spen Valley and was selected as candidate for Great Yarmouth since he needed a seat nearer London for the sake of his wife's health (in the event, he never stood for his new seat but remained MP for Spen Valley until his elevation to the Lords in 1940).

Simon bought Fritwell Manor in Oxfordshire, in 1911 and lived there until 1933. He was an avid chess player and frequently sought for as a dignitary to open major chess tournaments in England.

Simon was neither liked nor trusted, and he was never seriously considered for prime minister. He possessed an unfortunately chilly manner, and from at least 1914 onwards, he had difficulty in conveying an impression that he was acting from honourable motives. His awkward attempts to strike up friendships with his colleagues (asking his Cabinet colleagues to call him "Jack": only J. H. Thomas did so, and Neville Chamberlain settled on "John") often fell flat. Jenkins likens him to the nursery rhyme character Dr Fell. In the 1930s, his reputation sank particularly low. Although Simon's athletic build and good looks were remarked on even into his old age, the cartoonist David Low portrayed him with, in Low's own words, a "sinuous writhing body" to reflect his "disposition to subtle compromise". Harold Nicolson, after Simon had grabbed his arm from behind to talk to him (19 October 1944), wrote pithily "God what a toad and a worm Simon is!" Another anecdote, from the late 1940s, tells how the socialist intellectual G. D. H. Cole got into a third-class compartment on the train back from Oxford to London to break off conversation with Simon; to his dismay, Simon followed suit, only for both men to produce first-class tickets when the inspector did his rounds.

Simon was devoted to his mother and wrote a well-received Portrait of My Mother in 1936 after her death.

== Cases ==
=== House of Lords ===
- Nokes v Doncaster Amalgamated Collieries Ltd [1940] AC 1014

=== Judicial Committee of the Privy Council ===
- Abitibi Power and Paper Company Limited v. Montreal Trust Company, [1943] AC 536, [1943] UKPC 37 (PC – Canada): Constitution Act, 1867, s. 92(13) – provincial power to enact specific moratorium legislation
- Atlantic Smoke Shops Limited v Conlon, [1943] AC 550, [1943] UKPC 44 (PC – Canada): Constitution Act, 1867, s. 92(2) – provincial power to impose sales taxes
- The Attorney General of Ontario and others v The Canada Temperance Foundation and others, [1946] AC 193, [1946] UKPC 2 (PC – Canada): Constitution Act, 1867, s. 91, "peace, order and good government" – federal power to enact laws relating to matters of national concern

== Bibliography ==
- Best, Anthony (2015). "Sir John Simon (1873–1959) and 'This Manchurian Briar Patch'". In Cortazzi, Hugh (ed.). Britain & Japan: Biographical Portraits. Vol. 9. Amsterdam: Amsterdam University Press. pp. 595–608. doi:10.1017/9781898823278.054. ISBN 978-1-898823-27-8.
- Best, Anthony (2018). "Sir John Simon, 1873–1954 [1st Viscount Simon] Foreign Secretary, 1931–35". In Best, Anthony; Cortazzi, Hugh (eds.). British Foreign Secretaries and Japan 1850–1990: Aspects of the Evolution of British Foreign Policy. Amsterdam: Amsterdam University Press. pp. 162–172. doi:10.1017/9781898823742.017. ISBN 978-1-898823-74-2.
- Dutton, David (1989). "John Simon and the Post-War National Liberal Party: An Historical Postscript". The Historical Journal. 32 (2): 357–367. doi:10.1017/S0018246X0001219X.
- Dutton, David (1992). Simon: A Political Biography of Sir John Simon. London: Aurum Press. ISBN 1854102044.
- Dutton, David (1994). "Simon and Eden at the Foreign Office, 1931–1935". Review of International Studies. 20 (1): 35–52. doi:10.1017/S0260210500117772.
- Dutton, David (2005). "'Private' Papers: The Case of Sir John Simon". Archives: The Journal of the British Records Association. 31 (112): 73–83. doi:10.3828/archives.2005.14.
- Dutton, D. J. (2011) [2004]. "Simon, John Allsebrook, first Viscount Simon (1873–1954)". Oxford Dictionary of National Biography (online ed.). Oxford University Press. doi:10.1093/ref:odnb/36098. (Subscription, Wikipedia Library access or UK public library membership required.)
- Dutton, David (2011). "Guilty Men? Three British Foreign Secretaries of the 1930s". In Frank McDonough (ed.). Origins of the Second World War An International Perspective. London: Continuum. pp. 144–167.
- Hughes, Michael (2003). "The Foreign Secretary Goes to Court: John Simon and his Critics". Twentieth Century British History. 14 (4): 339–359. doi:10.1093/tcbh/14.4.339.
- Jenkins, Roy (1999). The Chancellors. London: Papermac. ISBN 0333730585. (essay on Simon, pp. 365–92)
- Pelling, Henry (1992) [1963]. A History of British Trade Unionism. London: Penguin. ISBN 978-0-14-013640-1.
- Ogata, Sadako (1964). Defiance in Manchuria. Los Angeles: University of California Press.
- Simon, John (1952). Retrospect: The Memoirs of the Rt. Hon. Viscount Simon G.C.S.I., G.C.V.O. London: Hutchinson.

Parliament of the United Kingdom
Preceded by David John Morgan	Member of Parliament for Walthamstow; 1906–1918	Constituency abolished
Preceded by Tom Myers	Member of Parliament for Spen Valley; 1922–1940	Succeeded by William Edward Woolley
Legal offices
Preceded by Sir Rufus Isaacs	Solicitor General; 1910–1913	Succeeded by Sir Stanley Buckmaster
Preceded by Sir Rufus Isaacs	Attorney General; 1913–1915	Succeeded by Sir Edward Carson
Political offices
Preceded by Reginald McKenna	Home Secretary; 1915–1916	Succeeded by Herbert Samuel
Preceded by The Marquess of Reading	Foreign Secretary; 1931–1935	Succeeded by Sir Samuel Hoare
Preceded by Sir John Gilmour	Home Secretary; 1935–1937	Succeeded by Sir Samuel Hoare
Preceded by Neville Chamberlain	Chancellor of the Exchequer; 1937–1940	Succeeded by Sir Kingsley Wood
Preceded by The Viscount Caldecote	Lord High Chancellor of Great Britain; 1940–1945	Succeeded by The Viscount Jowitt
Party political offices
Preceded by New position	Leader of the Liberal National Party; 1931–1940	Succeeded by Ernest Brown
Peerage of the United Kingdom
New creation	Viscount Simon; 1940–1954	Succeeded by John Gilbert Simon
