= 1919 Spen Valley by-election =

UK Parliamentary by-election

- 20 December 1919
- Registered: 39,667
- Turnout: 76.5%
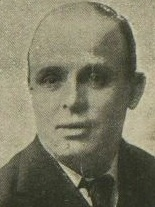

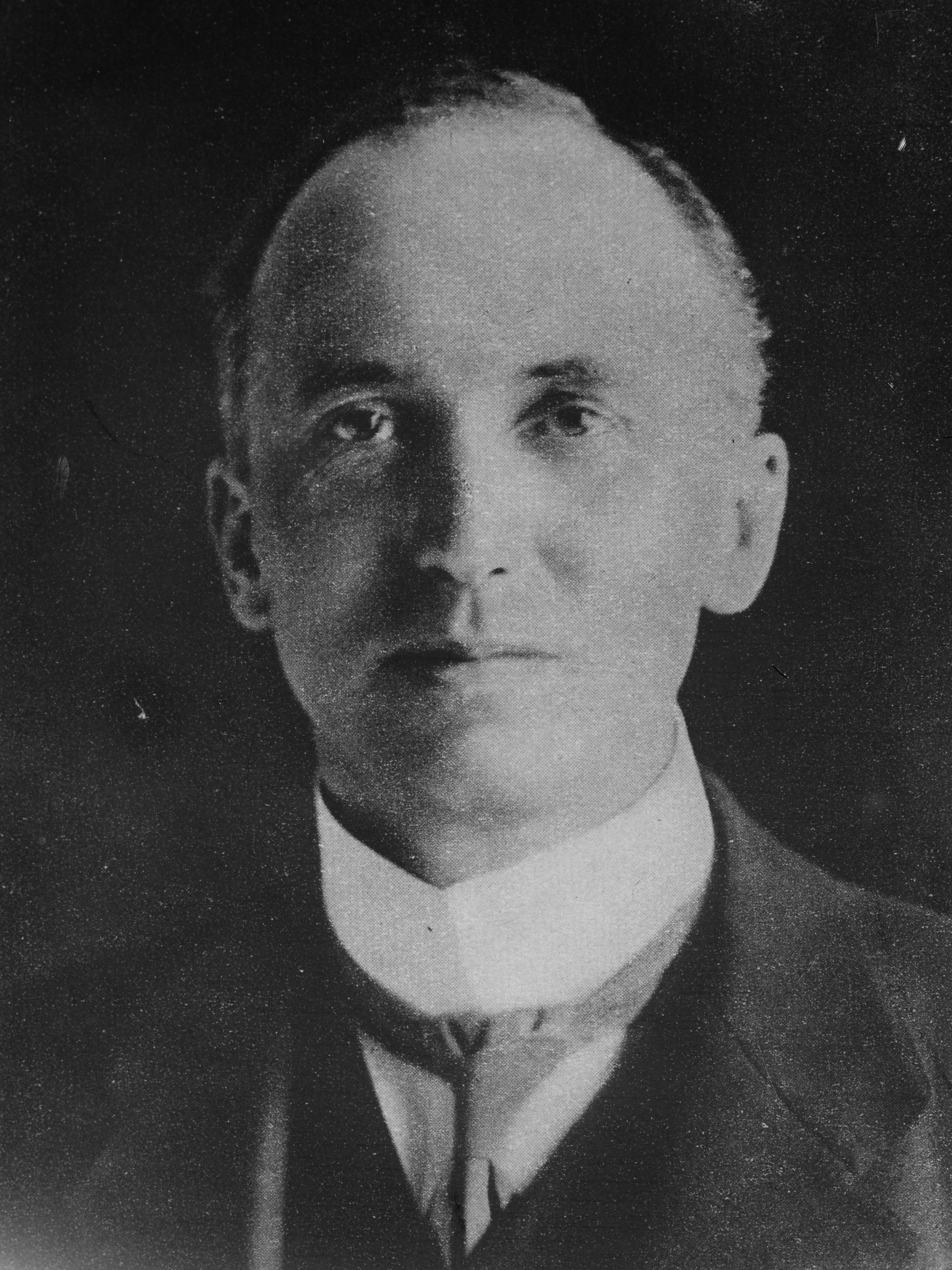

Candidate	Tom Myers	John Simon	Bryan Fairfax
Party	Labour	Liberal	National Liberal
Alliance			Coalition
Popular vote	11,962	10,244	8,134
Percentage	39.4%	33.8%	26.8%
Swing	▼5.0%	New	▼28.8%
MP before election
Thomas Whittaker
National Liberal
Subsequent MP
Tom Myers
Labour

The 1919 Spen Valley by-election was held on 20 December 1919. The by-election was held after the death of the incumbent Coalition Liberal MP, Thomas Whittaker. It was won by the Labour candidate, Tom Myers, who had contested the constituency at the 1918 general election. The 1918 contest had been a straight fight between Whittaker and Myers, and had seen the former emerge victorious with a majority of 2,156 votes (11.2% of votes cast).

== Candidates ==
Tom Myers, a member of Dewsbury Borough Council was the Labour candidate, as he had at the general election.

Colonel Bryan Fairfax was nominated as the Coalition Liberal candidate, and former Home Secretary Sir John Simon stood as an "Independent" Liberal.

== Campaign ==
The poll came at the same time as a serious split in the Liberal Party over continuing support for the coalition government.

== Result ==
The poll was held on 20 December 1919, but the votes were not counted until 3 January 1920. The result was seen as sensational, with The Times describing it as a "political event of great significance", with voters deserting the government candidate in "a humiliation which cannot be explained away".

1919 Spen Valley by-election
Party	Candidate	Votes	%	±%
Labour	Tom Myers	11,962	39.4	–5.0
Liberal	John Simon	10,244	33.8	N/A
National Liberal	Bryan Fairfax	8,134	26.8	–28.8
Majority		1,718	5.6	N/A
Turnout		30,340	76.5	+26.3
Registered electors		39,667		
Labour gain from National Liberal		Swing	+13.4	

== Aftermath ==
At the 1922 general election, Simon contested the seat as the sole Liberal candidate, although the Conservatives now fielded a candidate. However Simon emerged victorious with a majority of 787 votes over Myers. Myers would fight the seat again in 1923 and 1924, but Simon increased his majority on both occasions, most significantly to over 4,000 votes in 1924 when no Conservative opposed him. In the 1930s Simon broke from the Liberal Party, eventually forming his own Liberal National Party which worked in close alliance with the Conservatives. He would hold the Spen Valley seat until his elevation to the peerage in 1940, prompting the 1940 Spen Valley by-election.

In the view of Maurice Cowling, Simon's defeat at the by election marked the point at which Labour began to be seen as a serious threat by the older parties.
