= 1940 Spen Valley by-election =

UK parliamentary by-election

The 1940 Spen Valley by-election was a by-election held for the British House of Commons constituency of Spen Valley on 1 June 1940. The seat had become vacant when the Liberal National Member of Parliament Sir John Simon, had been elevated to the peerage as Viscount Simon. Simon had held the seat since the 1922 general election.

During the Second World War the political parties in the Coalition Government had agreed not to contest by-elections when a vacancy arose in any of the seats held by the other coalition parties. As a result, the only candidate was William Woolley of the Liberal National Party, who was returned unopposed. He represented the constituency until his defeat at the 1945 general election.

== See also ==
- Spen Valley (UK Parliament constituency)
- List of United Kingdom by-elections
