= Thomas Whittaker (politician) =

British politician

Thomas Whittaker

Sir Thomas Palmer Whittaker PC (7 January 1850 – 9 November 1919) was a British businessman and Liberal Party politician.

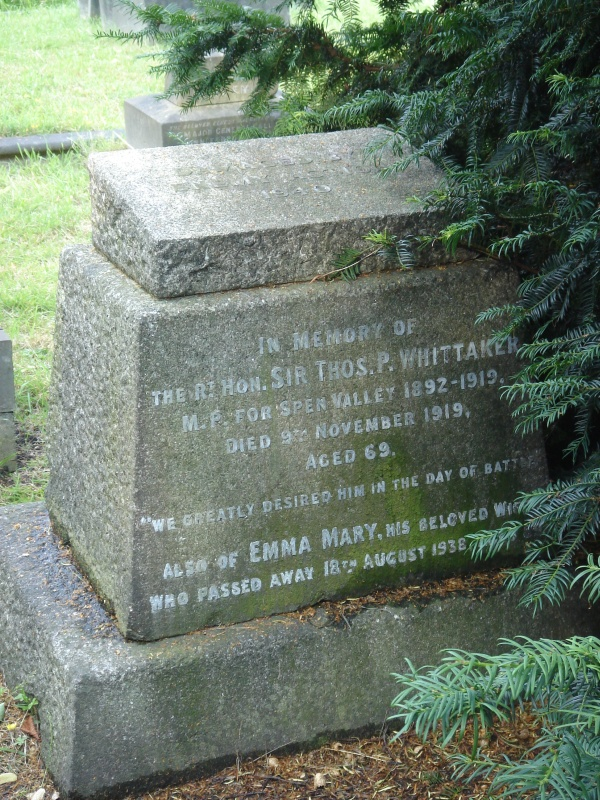
Funerary monument, Brompton Cemetery, London

== Early life ==
Whittaker was born in Scarborough, Yorkshire. Following education at Huddersfield College he entered business at the age of 16, selling hardware and iron goods. In 1874 he married Emma Mary Theedham. In 1882 he became the editor of a number of newspapers, subsequently moving to the London area.

== Parliament ==
At the 1892 general election Whittaker was elected to the Commons as Liberal member of parliament for the Spen Valley constituency in the West Riding of Yorkshire. He was re-elected at each subsequent election, holding the seat until his death. In parliament he was a committed advocate of the temperance movement and sought reform of the alcohol licensing laws. This led to his appointment as a member of the Royal Commission on Licensing of 1896–1899. Outside Parliament Whittaker continued to have a number of business interests including being chairman and managing director of the Life Assurance Institution. He was knighted in 1906, and appointed to the privy council in 1908. He found himself criticising his own party's budget in 1909 as he felt the taxation measures would erode the savings of many small investors in industrial and provident societies. He was appointed the chairman of the Select Committee on Parliamentary Procedure in 1914, immediately prior to World War I. During the war his connections with the newspaper industry led him to be named chairman in 1916 of the Royal Commission on the Importation of Paper, which attempted to tackle the problems of paper shortage. At the 1918 general election he received the "coupon" and was re-elected as a Coalition Liberal.

Whittaker died suddenly in November 1919 aged 69, while visiting Lady Hartington in Eastbourne, Sussex. He is buried in Brompton Cemetery, London.

The famous Spen Valley by-election ensued, at which his seat fell to Labour.

== Works ==
- Free trade, reciprocity, and foreign competition , 1879
- The ownership, tenure and taxation of land, some facts, fallacies and proposals relating thereto , 1914

== Notes ==
Parliament of the United Kingdom
Preceded by Joseph Woodhead	Member of Parliament for Spen Valley; 1892–1919	Succeeded by Tom Myers
