= German Sims Woodhead =

English pathologist (1855–1921)

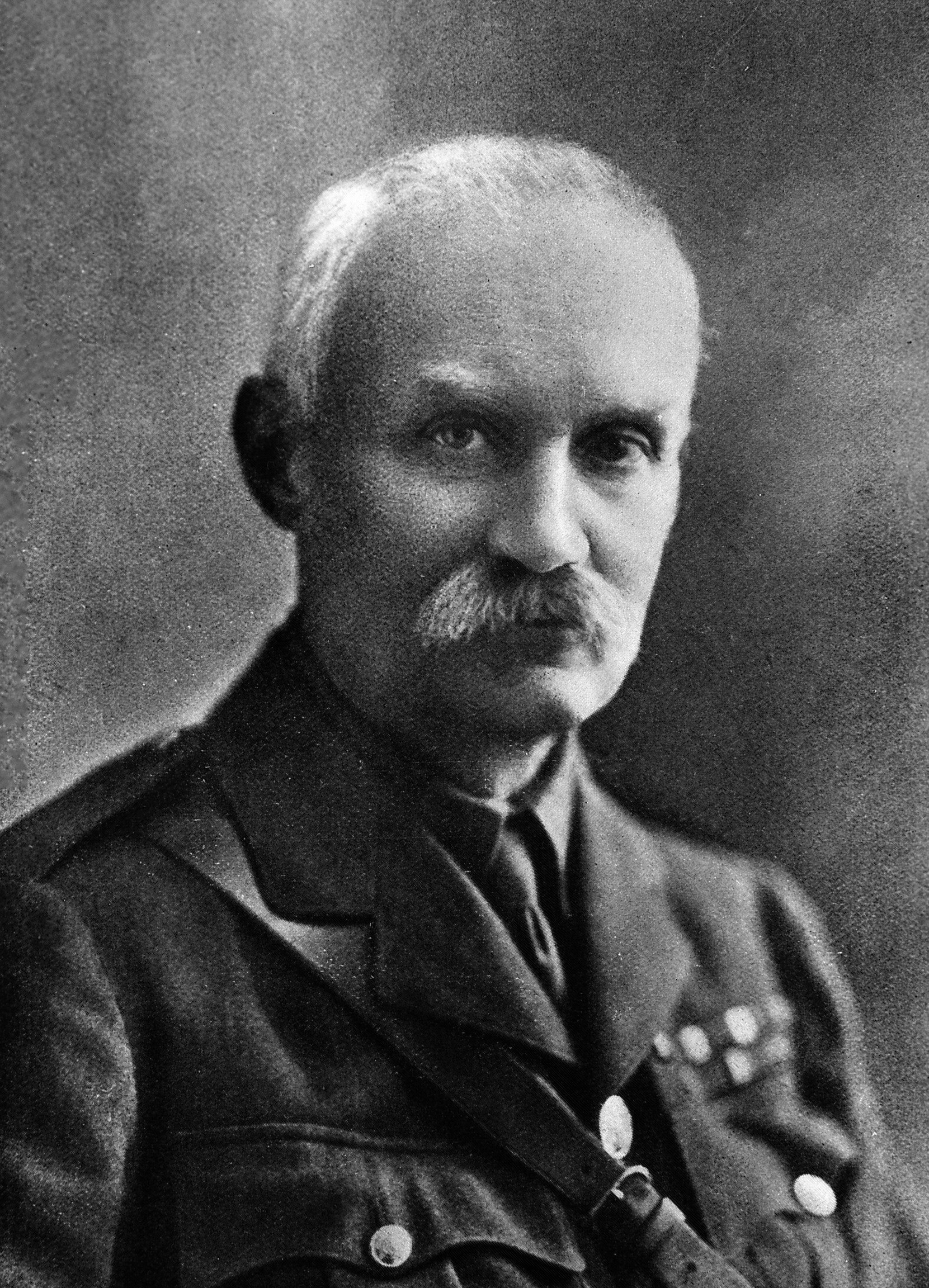
German Sims Woodhead

Lt.-Col. and Bt. Col. Sir German Sims Woodhead, KBE, FRSE, FRCPE (29 April 1855 – 29 December 1921) was an English pathologist.

== Life ==
He was born at Woodland Mount, a large country house near Huddersfield, on 29 April 1855 the son of Joseph Woodhead, a newspaper owner (and later politician), and his wife Catherine Woodhead.

He was educated at Huddersfield College. He then studied medicine at Edinburgh University, graduating MB ChB in 1878.

From 1885 to 1890 he worked as a lab assistant in Edinburgh University, living then at 6 Marchhall Crescent. During his time in Edinburgh, in 1886, he was elected a Fellow of the Royal Society of Edinburgh. His proposers were Sir William Turner, Alexander Crum Brown, Robert Gray and Sir John Murray.

In 1890, aged only 35, he became director of the Conjoint Laboratories of the Royal Colleges of Physicians and of Surgeons in London.

In 1899 he was made professor of pathology in Cambridge University. He was the first editor of the Journal of Pathology.

In the First World War he was the inspector of government laboratories serving all military hospitals. He was attached to the RAMC at the rank of lieurenant colonel. Largely as a result of this service, he was knighted (KBE) by King George V in 1919, as part of the Birthday Honours.

He died at Aisthorpe Hall in Lincolnshire on 29 December 1921 and is buried in Cambridge City Cemetery.

== Family ==
In 1881, he married Harriet Elizabeth St Clair Erskine Yates.

== Published work ==
- Practical Pathology (1883)
- Pathological Mycology (1885), with A. W. Hare
- Bacteria and Their Products (1891)
- Report to the Royal Commission on Tuberculosis (1895)
