= William Woolley =

British politician (1901–1989)

William Edward Woolley (17 March 1901 – 11 May 1989) was a Liberal National politician in the United Kingdom.

He was elected in 1940 as Member of Parliament (MP) for the Spen Valley constituency in the West Riding of Yorkshire, at an unopposed by-election on 1 June. At the 1945 general election, he lost the seat to the Labour Party candidate, Granville Maynard Sharp.

Parliament of the United Kingdom
| Preceded by Sir John Simon | Member of Parliament for Spen Valley; 1940–1945 | Succeeded by Granville Maynard Sharp |
