= Granville Maynard Sharp =

British politician (1906–1997)

Granville Maynard Sharp (5 January 1906 – 8 August 1997) was a Labour Party politician in the United Kingdom.

Sharp was educated at Cleckheaton Grammar School, Ashville College in Harrogate, and St John's College, Cambridge, where he read economics. He became joint owner of his father's outfitters, and from 1928 until 1934 also served as a lecturer at the W. R. Technical Institute. He was commissioned in May 1939 and during the Second World War, he served in an Anti-Tank Regiment, and then as quartermaster general for Northern Ireland from 1942 to 1943. He became the senior British staff officer in the Economic Section of the Allied Control Commission in Italy, and then held a similar post in Austria.

Lieutenant-Colonel Sharp was elected at the 1945 general election as a Labour Member of Parliament (MP) for the Spen Valley constituency in West Yorkshire and held the seat until its abolition at the 1950 general election. He returned to politics in 1970 by serving as a Conservative on East Sussex County Council, then from 1973 on both West Sussex County Council and Mid Sussex District Council.

Parliament of the United Kingdom
Preceded by William Woolley	Member of Parliament for Spen Valley; 1945 – 1950	Constituency abolished
