= Kathleen Simon, Viscountess Simon =

Anglo-Irish anti-slavery activist (1869–1955)

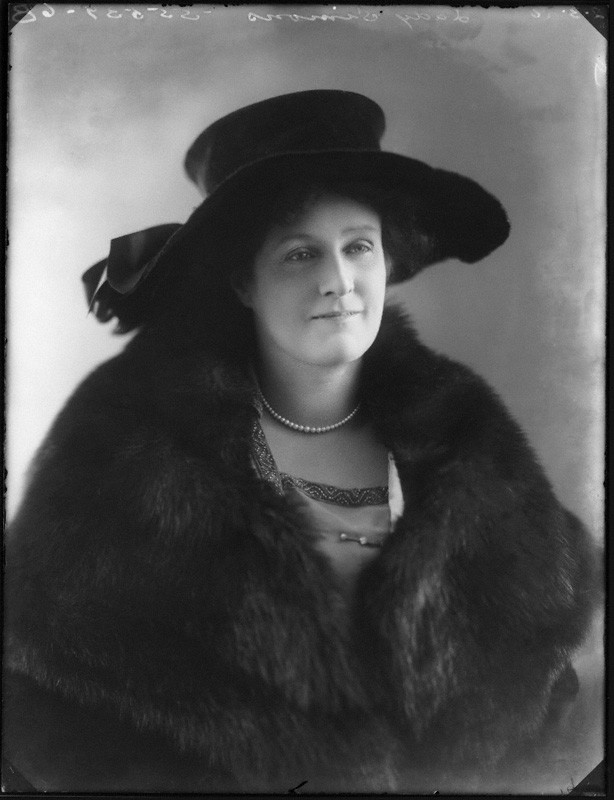
Lady Simon on 17 February 1920

Kathleen Rochard Simon, Viscountess Simon, DBE (formerly Manning, née Harvey; 23 September 1869 – 27 March 1955) was an Anglo-Irish anti-slavery activist. She was inspired to research slavery after living in Tennessee with her first husband, and she joined the abolitionist movement when she returned to London after his death. With her second husband, Sir John Simon, she campaigned against all forms of servitude. Travelling and speaking throughout her life, she was renowned for her commitment to ending slavery and racial discrimination, and was appointed Dame Commander of the Order of the British Empire.

== Early life ==
Kathleen Rochard Harvey was born in Rathmines, South Dublin into a landed Irish family, the Harveys of Kyle (near Enniscorthy, County Wexford). She was the elder daughter of Frances (née Pollock) and Francis Harvey, who taught their daughters to appreciate liberty and despise slavery. In addition to receiving private education, she attended several Dublin schools. She was trained as a nurse and married the Irish physician Thomas Manning MD on 21 February 1885.

The couple moved to the United States and settled in Tennessee. They had one son, Brian O'Donoghue Manning (1891–1964).

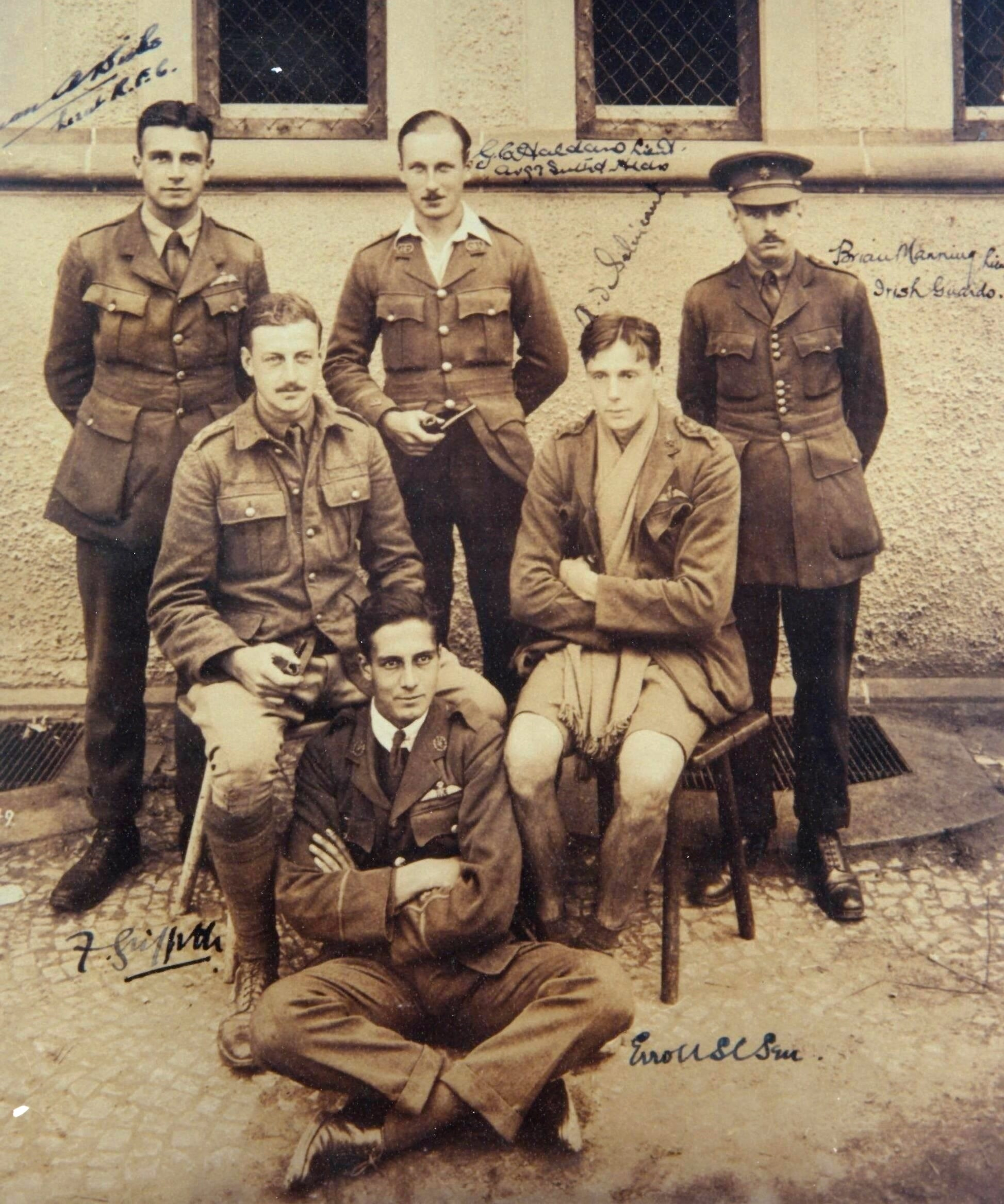
Kathleen Manning's son Brian (far right) in Holzminden prisoner-of-war camp, c. 1918

After her first husband's death, Kathleen Manning moved to London and started working as a midwife in the East End. Finding that she could not earn enough by midwifery alone, she took up the post of governess to the children of the widowed Sir John Simon. When her son, serving in the First World War as a member of the Irish Guards, became a prisoner of war, she asked Simon for help. The two soon got engaged; it has been suggested that the proposal came after Sir John was turned down by Margaret Greville. She married him on 18 December 1917 in France, becoming known as Lady Simon, and remained there with the Red Cross.

== Political engagement ==
While living in Tennessee with her first husband, Kathleen Manning had witnessed discrimination against a young African-American girl named Amanda. Upon moving to London, she joined the Anti-Slavery and Aborigines' Protection Society. Lady Simon called for a peaceful settlement of the Irish War of Independence, condemning the tactics of Black and Tans and Sinn Féin alike. She was not well-liked by high society. Prime Minister Neville Chamberlain said of Sir John: "How he came to marry that wife I don't know. She doesn't seem to fit the part of a grande dame!"

=== Abolitionism ===
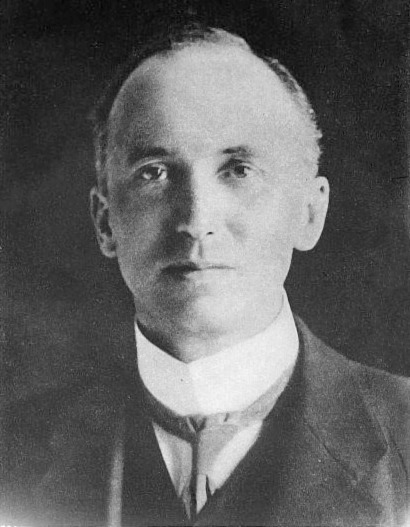
Sir John Simon, photographed in 1916

In 1927 Lady Simon and Violet Bonham Carter decided to support the abolitionism convention made by the League of Nations, stating that "no colour barrier should be erected which will prevent native people from reaching positions for which their capacities and merits fit them". Sir John and Lady Simon's report on instances of slavery being practised in the colony of Sierra Leone was published by The Times. Lady Simon again demonstrated her interest in the rights of African Americans in 1928, when she attended the dedication of the Wilberforce Monument alongside the NAACP president Walter Francis White.

Throughout the 1920s, Lady Simon researched chattel slavery throughout the world, deeming that there were more than six million "living in bondage" worldwide. The highly successful book, titled Slavery, was published in 1929 and was dedicated to "Amanda of Tennessee". The Sunday Times welcomed it as a "startling indictment of modern civilisation", while The Daily News wrote that "this country cannot wash its hands of responsibility". W. E. B. Du Bois reviewed and appreciated the study, but found it compromised by excessive reliance on official reports. Their discussion about the book led to a long-lasting friendship. She remained a stalwart of the Anti-Slavery and Aborigines' Protection Society.

Lady Simon embarrassed the supporters of Haile Selassie I, Emperor of Ethiopia, on the eve of the Second Italo–Ethiopian War by uncovering his slave-owning wealth. She claimed that Benito Mussolini had convinced her that he would try to eradicate slavery in Ethiopia.

=== Campaigns against other forced labour ===
Lady Simon was most concerned about less conspicuous forms of servitude, including indentured labour, peonage, and debt bondage. Deeming it incompatible with the principles of trusteeship under the League of Nations, she publicly opposed the policy of utilising forced labour in East Africa. For several decades, she fought for the emancipation of Mui tsai, domestically enslaved girls in China, along with MP's Edith Picton-Turbervill and Eleanor Rathbone.

== Later years ==
In 1933, Lady Simon was rewarded for her efforts by being appointed Dame Commander of the Order of the British Empire. In the course of her campaign, she travelled extensively both abroad and within the country, giving speeches and raising funds. In 1934 alone, she addressed 10,000 people. Three years later, Sir John became Chancellor of the Exchequer and the couple moved to 11 Downing Street. In the years just before the Second World War, Lady Simon criticised the Nazi regime and was sympathetic to Zionism. In April 1940, despite being crippled by severe osteoarthritis, she hosted a conference at 11 Downing Street, where she emphasised the importance of preparing the people of the Empire for home rule and opposing racial discrimination. The same year, her husband was created Viscount Simon and she became Viscountess Simon.

== Death ==
John Simon, 1st Viscount Simon died in 1954. Kathleen Simon, Viscountess Simon, died at her home in Golders Green in 1955, aged 85, and was cremated at Golders Green Crematorium.

== Works ==
Simon, Kathleen (1929). Slavery. London: Hodder and Stoughton.
