= Joseph Woodhead =

Joseph Woodhead (1824 - 21 May 1913) was an English newspaper proprietor and editor and a Liberal Party politician.

Woodhead was the youngest son of Godfrey Woodhead, a currier and leather merchant of Holmfirth. He was educated at private schools but grew up in a home where books and reading were valued. At fifteen he was apprenticed to a woollen manufacturer working all day and studying until late at night. He was a teetotaller and spoke at temperance meeting. In 1851 with a group of like-minded local Liberals he founded the Huddersfield Examiner newspaper which was produced in a room over a shop in Kirkgate. He made it into a leading exponent of non-conformist liberalism and in 1871 it became a daily evening paper. Woodhead also established the Dewsbury Reporter. In 1868, he was elected to Huddersfield Town Council and became an Alderman of Huddersfield and was twice Mayor of Huddersfield in 1876 and 1877. Huddersfield Town Hall, known as a concert venue, was sited opposite his newspaper offices and in 1885 he was president of the Glee and Madrigal Society - now the Huddersfield Singers. He was also a J. P.

At the 1885 general election Woodhead was elected as the Member of Parliament (MP) for Spen Valley. He held the seat until 1892. He is said to have turned down a baronetcy as he had no wish to be known as other than Joe Woodhead. In 1898 he was awarded Freedom of the City of Huddersfield.

In the 1891 Census of Huddersfield Woodhead is listed as a 66-year-old Newspaper proprietor, Justice of the Peace and Member of Parliament living at Longdenholme, West Hill, Huddersfield with his four sons.

Woodhead lived at Longdenholme, Huddersfield and at Preswylfa, Conway. He died in Huddersfield at the age of 89.

Woodhead married Catherine Woodhead in 1853. Their son Sir German Sims Woodhead became an eminent pathologist. Another son Ernest Woodhead played rugby for England.

Parliament of the United Kingdom
New constituency	Member of Parliament for Spen Valley; 1885 – 1892	Succeeded by Thomas Whittaker
