= Tom Myers (politician) =

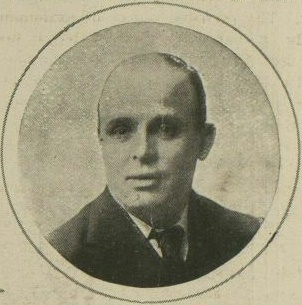
Myers in 1920

Tom Myers (15 February 1872 – 21 December 1949) was a British Labour Party politician.

Born in Mirfield, Myers left school at the age of 12 and spent several years working in coal mines and factories in the West Riding of Yorkshire before taking up employment at a glass bottle works. An early supporter of the Labour Party, he was elected to Thornhill Urban District Council in 1904. In 1910 the urban district was absorbed by the municipal borough of Dewsbury, and Myers became a member of Dewsbury Borough Council.

At the 1918 general election Myers contested the constituency of Spen Valley for the Labour Party, but failed to unseat the sitting Coalition Liberal Member of Parliament, Sir Thomas Whittaker. Whittaker died in November 1919, and Myers was selected to fight the ensuing by election. The by-election came at the same time as a serious split in the Liberal Party over continuing support for the coalition government: Colonel B C Fairfax was nominated as the Coalition Liberal candidate while Sir John Simon stood as an Independent Liberal. The poll was held on 20 December 1919, although the votes were not counted until 3 January of the following year. Myers received 11,962 votes and was elected to the Commons, with a majority of 1,718 over Simon, and the coalition candidate trailing in a poor third place. The result was seen as sensational, with The Times describing it as a "political event of great significance" with voters deserting the government candidate in "a humiliation which cannot be explained away".

The coalition finally fell in 1922, with a general election called for November. Myers defended his seat against Sir John Simon, now the Liberal candidate, and W O R Holton of the Conservative Party. Myers was defeated by Simon. He tried unsuccessfully to regain the seat in 1923 and 1924. While in 1922 Myers had only lost by 787 votes, Simon's margin of victory increased to over 1,000 in 1923 and to 4,475 in 1924, although on that occasion there was no Conservative candidate.

He returned to Dewsbury Borough Council in 1935, and was the town's mayor in 1940–1941. He died in Dewsbury in 1949, aged 77.

Parliament of the United Kingdom
Preceded by Sir Thomas Whittaker	Member of Parliament for Spen Valley; 1920 – 1922	Succeeded by Sir John Simon
