= Andrew Jones (historian) =

Andrew Jones (born 1944) is a British historian of nineteenth century British politics.

Jones was a Fellow of Trinity Hall, Cambridge from 1969 until 1971. In 1971 he was appointed lecturer in history at the University of Reading. In 1972, he published a study of the high-political circumstances surrounding the Representation of the People Act 1884, The Politics of Reform 1884. In this, Jones received editorial assistance and personal encouragement from Maurice Cowling, acknowledging that without his earlier study of the Representation of the People Act 1867, "the structure of the present work would have been much different". The Politics of Reform was praised by Michael Bentley as "masterly" and "an eloquent, precisely-mouthed challenge to those who would try to make of history something it is not", and used by A.B. Cooke and John Vincent while preparing The Governing Passion, their own high-political account of the Government of Ireland Bill 1886.

== Works ==
- The Politics of Reform 1884 (Cambridge: Cambridge University Press, 1972). ISBN 0521083761
- 'Where ‘Governing is the Use of Words’', The Historical Journal, Vol. 19, No. 1 (March 1976), pp. 251-256.
