= Bryan Fairfax (cricketer) =

English cricketer and British Army officer

Personal information
- Full name: Bryan Charles Fairfax
- Born: 12 September 1873; Bilbrough, Yorkshire, England
- Died: 29 January 1950 (aged 76); Whitwell-on-the-Hill, Yorkshire, England
- Batting: Unknown

Domestic team information
- Years: Team
- 1897/98: Europeans

Career statistics
| Competition | First-class |
|---|---|
| Matches | 2 |
| Runs scored | 42 |
| Batting average | 10.50 |
| 100s/50s | –/– |
| Top score | 25 |
| Catches/stumpings | 1/– |
- Source: ESPNcricinfo, 23 November 2022

Bryan Charles Fairfax CMG (12 September 1873 – 29 January 1950) was an English first-class cricketer and British Army officer.

== Early life and education ==
The son of Thomas Ferdinand Fairfax, he was born in September 1873 at Bilbrough, Yorkshire, England. He attended the Royal Military College, Sandhurst

== Military service ==
In March 1893, Fairfax was commissioned as a second lieutenant into the Durham Light Infantry, British Army. While serving in British India, he made two appearances in first-class cricket for the Europeans cricket team against the Parsees in the Bombay Presidency Matches of 1897. He scored 42 runs in his two matches, with a highest score of 25. He was promoted to lieutenant in August 1896, before being seconded for service with the Weihaiwei Regiment in December 1899. During his secondment he saw action in the Boxer Rebellion. He was promoted to captain in February 1900, before being seconded for service in the Second Boer War. Fairfax was appointed aide-de-camp to Major-General Sir Neville Lyttelton in 1903 and later served as aide-de-camp to Sir Arthur Lawley, the Governor of Madras.

Fairfax later served in the First World War, being placed in command of the 17th Battalion, King's Regiment (Liverpool) in February 1915, upon which he was granted the temporary rank of lieutenant colonel. He was placed in command of the Chinese workers of the Chinese Labour Corps in November 1916, with the Corps officially being formed in February 1917. He was admitted to the Order of St Michael and St George in the 1918 New Year Honours, with promotion to major following in the same month, antedated to September 1914. In March 1918, he was appointed a temporary colonel in February 1918, while employed as an assistant adjutant general. He relinquished the rank in February 1919, before gaining the full rank in May 1919. Following the war, he was decorated by the Republic of China with the Order of Wen-Hu, 3rd Class in February 1920.

== Later life ==
Following his retirement, he became a well known racehorse owner in the North-East of England, purchasing the Blink Bonny Stud Farm in 1927. Fairfax died in January 1950 at Whitwell Hall in Whitwell-on-the-Hill, Yorkshire.

Fairfax stood as a candidate in the 1919 Spen Valley by-election but came last out of three candidates.
