= Viscount Simon =

British peerage

Viscountcy Simon
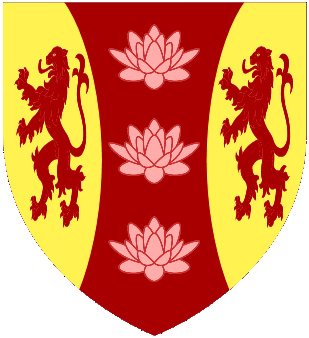
- Arms of the Viscounts Simon; Gules three Lotus Flowers in pale proper between two Flaunches Or each charged with a Lion rampant of the field.
- Creation date: 1940
- Created by: King George VI
- Peerage: Peerage of the United Kingdom
- First holder: Sir John Simon
- Last holder: David Simon, 3rd Viscount Simon
- Subsidiary titles: None
- Status: Extinct
- Extinction date: 15 August 2021
- Motto: J'Ai Ainsi Mon Nom (Such is my name)

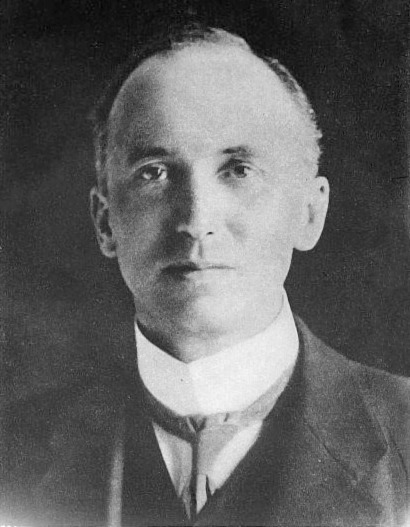
John Simon, 1st Viscount Simon

Viscount Simon, of Stackpole Elidor in the County of Pembroke, was a title in the Peerage of the United Kingdom. It was created on 20 May 1940 for the Liberal politician Sir John Simon. He was Home Secretary from 1915 to 1916 and 1935 to 1937, Foreign Secretary from 1931 to 1935, Chancellor of the Exchequer from 1937 to 1940 and Lord Chancellor from 1940 to 1945. His second wife Kathleen was a noted campaigner against slavery and other forms of involuntary servitude worldwide, and against racial discrimination. From 1993 to 2021, the title was held by his grandson, the third Viscount, who succeeded his father in 1993. He was one of the ninety elected hereditary peers that remained in the House of Lords after the passing of the House of Lords Act 1999, and sat on the Labour benches. He was married to Mary Elizabeth Burns from 1969 until her death in 2020. He died on 15 August 2021, and his only living child was Fiona; he had no male heir and the viscountcy became extinct upon his death.

== Viscounts Simon (1940) ==
- John Allsebrook Simon, 1st Viscount Simon (1873–1954)
- John Gilbert Simon, 2nd Viscount Simon (1902–1993)
- Jan David Simon, 3rd Viscount Simon (1940–2021)
