= Maurice Cowling =

British historian (1926–2005)

Maurice John Cowling
- Born: 6 September 1926; London, England
- Died: 24 August 2005 (aged 78); Swansea, Wales
- Education: Jesus College, Cambridge
- Occupation: Historian
- Known for: His "high politics" interpretation of modern British history

Maurice John Cowling (6 September 1926 – 24 August 2005) was a British historian. A fellow of Peterhouse, Cambridge, for most of his career, Cowling was a leading conservative exponent of the 'high politics' approach to political history.

== Early life ==
Cowling was born in West Norwood, South London, son of Reginald Frederick Cowling (1901–1962), a patent agent, and his wife May (née Roberts). His family then moved to Streatham, where Cowling attended an LCC elementary school and, from 1937, Battersea Grammar School. When the Second World War started in 1939 the school moved to Worthing and then from 1940 to Hertford, where Cowling attended sixth form.

In 1943 Cowling won a scholarship to Jesus College, Cambridge, but was called up for military service in September 1944, where he joined the Queen's Royal Regiment. In 1945, after training and serving in a holding battalion, he was sent to Bangalore as an officer cadet.

In 1946 Cowling was attached to the Kumaon Regiment and the next year-and-a-half he travelled to Agra, Razmak on the North-West Frontier and Assam. As independence for India neared in 1947, Cowling was dispatched to Egypt as a camp adjutant to the British HQ there. Cowling was then promoted to captain in Libya. By the end of 1947 he was finally demobilised, and in 1948 he went back to Jesus College to complete his History Tripos, where he received a double first. Cowling later remembered that he fell in love with Cambridge. He toyed with the idea of being ordained and went to college chapel, possessing "a strong polemical Christianity". Of his religion, Cowling later said:

I'm not sure of the depth or reality of my religious conviction. It could well be that it was a polemical conviction against liberalism rather than a real conviction of the truth of Christianity ... I suppose on a census I would describe myself as a member of the Church of England. If you ask me, do I think I ought to be an Anglican, the answer is that I probably ought to be a Roman Catholic, but I don't see any prospect of that happening ... I have a very Protestant mind.

In 1954 Cowling worked at the British Foreign Office for six months at the Jordan department, and in early 1955, The Times gave him the job of foreign leader-writer, which he held for three years. In 1957 Cowling was invited by the Director of the Conservative Political Centre to write a pamphlet on the Suez Crisis; it was never published however, as the party wanted to move on from Suez as quickly as possible. He stood unsuccessfully for the parliamentary seat of Bassetlaw during the General Election of 1959 for the Conservative Party. Cowling later said that "I enjoyed being a candidate, though it was very hard work and elections are like what I imagine having all your teeth out is like".

== Academic career ==
In 1961 Cowling was elected a fellow of Jesus College and Director of Studies in Economics, shortly before the History Faculty appointed him to an Assistant Lectureship. Cowling's first book was The Nature and Limits of Political Science. Influenced by Michael Oakeshott, this was an attack on political science and political philosophy as it was then taught. Cowling argued that social science's claim to have discovered how people behaved was false because politics was too complex and fluid to be rationalised by theorists and only fully intelligible to politicians.

During six weeks of the summer of 1962 Cowling wrote Mill and Liberalism, which was published in 1963 and became one of his most contentious books. The book argued Mill was not as libertarian as he was traditionally portrayed, and that Mill resembled a "moral totalitarian". Dr. Roland Hall reviewed the book in Philosophical Quarterly (January 1965) and called it "dangerous and unpleasant", with Cowling later remarking that this "was what it was intended to be".

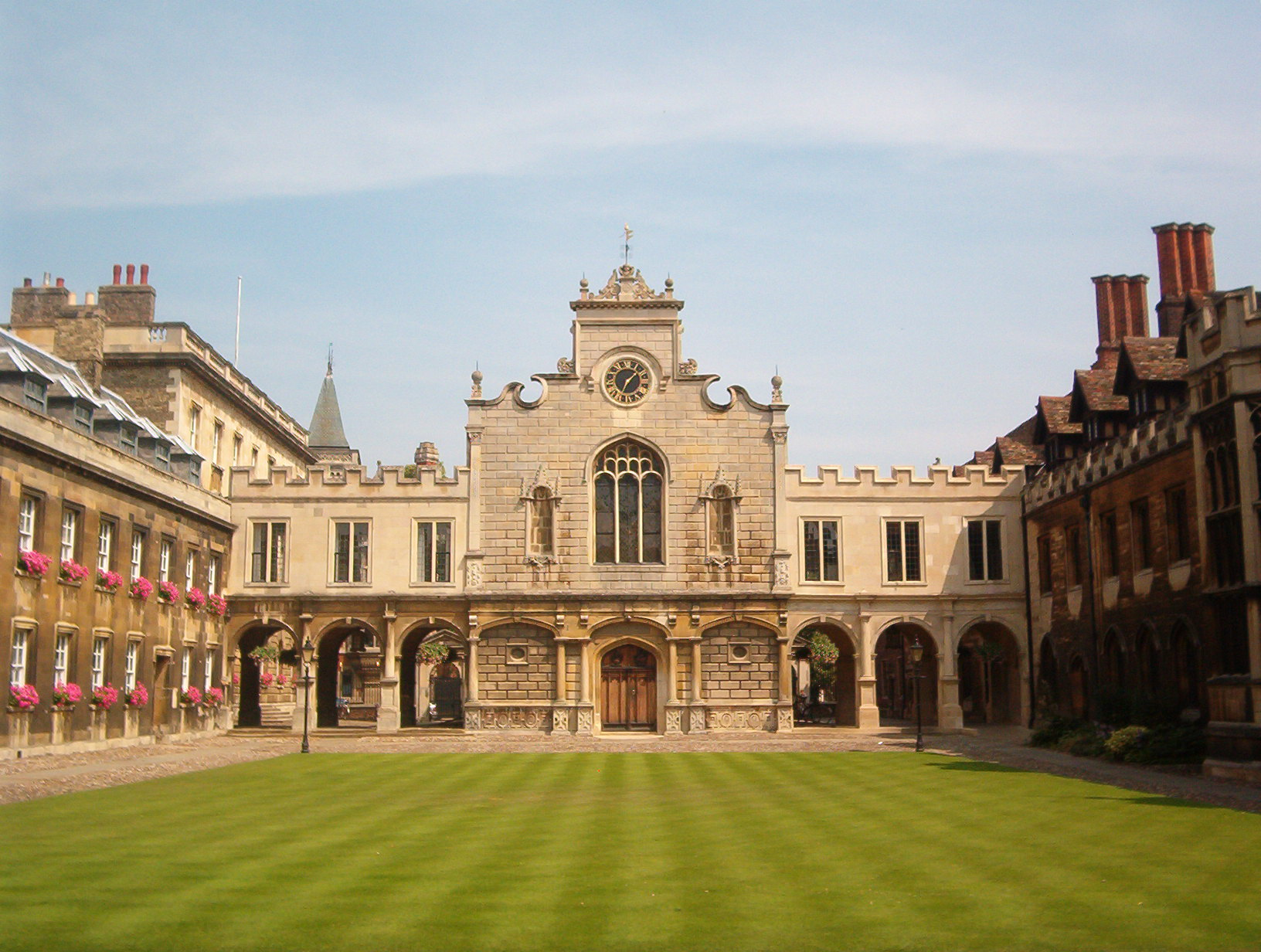
Peterhouse Old Court

In 1963 he was elected a Fellow to Peterhouse, Cambridge, where he advised his students to tackle liberals with "irony, geniality and malice". During the 1960s Cowling campaigned against a sociology course to be introduced at Cambridge, regarding it as a "vehicle for liberal dogma". In November 1966 Cowling was elected as a Conservative councillor on the Cambridgeshire and Isle of Ely County Council in a by-election, which he held until 1970.

He was appointed the literary editor of The Spectator from 1970 to 1971, and in the early 1970s he wrote articles of a broadly Powellite nature arguing against the UK being a member of the EEC. Cowling resigned in 1971 when the editor acting in George Gale's absence refused to publish Cowling's protest against his publication of an article by Tony Palmer which suggested that the important question about Princess Anne was whether she was a virgin.

Cowling supported Andrew Jones while composing The Politics of Reform (1972), a monograph on the high political circumstances surrounding the Representation of the People Act 1884. Jones speculated that without his involvement, "the structure of the present work would have been much different". It was on Cowling's suggestion that Paul Smith edited a collection of Lord Salisbury's articles from the Quarterly Review, also published in 1972.

In 1977 Margaret Thatcher visited the Cambridge Graduate Conservative Association of Peterhouse where she "cut through the compact subtlety and 'rational pessimism' of [Cowling]" and sharply retorted: "We don't want pessimists in our party". In 1978 he ceased to be Director of Studies in Peterhouse, and helped to found the Salisbury Group, a group of conservative thinkers named, on Michael Oakeshott's advice, after Lord Salisbury. In the same year Cowling published Conservative Essays where he said:

If there is a class war – and there is – it is important that it should be handled with subtlety and skill. ... it is not freedom that Conservatives want; what they want is the sort of freedom that will maintain existing inequalities or restore lost ones.

Cowling was "instrumental" in getting the historian Hugh Trevor-Roper, Lord Dacre of Glanton, from Oxford to become Master of Peterhouse from 1980 to 1987, though in later years he came to regret supporting Trevor-Roper's arrival there. Cowling's reactionary clique thought he would be an arch-conservative who would oppose the admission of women. In the event, Trevor-Roper feuded constantly with Cowling and his allies, while launching a series of administrative reforms. Women were admitted in 1983 at Trevor-Roper's urging. The British journalist Neal Ascherson summarised the quarrel between Cowling and Trevor-Roper as:

Lord Dacre, far from being a romantic Tory ultra, turned out to be an anti-clerical Whig with a preference for free speech over superstition. He did not find it normal that fellows should wear mourning on the anniversary of General Franco’s death, attend parties in SS uniform or insult black and Jewish guests at high table. For the next seven years, Trevor-Roper battled to suppress the insurgency of the Cowling clique ("a strong mind trapped in its own glutinous frustrations"), and to bring the college back to a condition in which students might actually want to go there. Neither side won this struggle, which soon became a campaign to drive Trevor-Roper out of the college by grotesque rudeness and insubordination.

In a review of Adam Sisman's 2010 biography of Trevor-Roper, the Economist wrote that the picture of Peterhouse in the 1980s was "startling", stating the college had become under Cowling's influence a sort of right-wing "lunatic asylum", who were determined to sabotage Trevor-Roper's reforms.

In November 1989 Cowling published his essay on "The Sources of the New Right" in Encounter which detailed the ideological roots of Thatcherism in Britain and became the Preface to the second edition of Mill and Liberalism in 1990. In 1990 Cowling described himself as "an intellectual Thatcherite, just as I was an intellectual Powellite, and I think it is important that the Conservative party should be in good hands and that it should win elections...I am a warm supporter [of the Thatcher government]". In Cowling's view "Liberalism is essentially the belief that there can be a reconciliation of all difficulties and differences, and since there can't, it is a misleading way to approach politics". He regarded Salman Rushdie's The Satanic Verses as "a nasty, sneering, free-thinking book ... I can understand why the book is offensive and it didn't seem to me to be anything but offensive when I read it. Some thinking Moslems take a view of the nature of religion, and the incompatibility between Islam and liberalism, which runs parallel to what I'm saying in Mill and Liberalism".

In 1992 Philip Williamson cited Cowling as "the original inspiration" for his monograph on interwar high politics, National Crisis and National Government.

== Later life ==
Cowling retired from the History Faculty of Cambridge in 1988, and from his Fellowship of Peterhouse in 1993. He rarely returned to the university. In 1996, in Swansea, where he then lived, Cowling married George Gale's ex-wife Patricia, with whom he had long conducted an affair. On 24 August 2005, Cowling died at Singleton Hospital in Swansea after a long illness.

== The Politics of British Democracy ==
Cowling wrote three books on British high politics, the sequence he called The Politics of British Democracy. He wrote that "In the future there will be an introduction bearing the sequence-title which will deal in its widest aspects with the period from 1850 to 1940 and will assess the methods used in the volumes which have now been published". However this never appeared. Cowling wrote a letter to The Times Literary Supplement on 3 June 1977 arguing for the need for "a different emphasis" to that on high politics.

The first of these was 1867: Disraeli, Gladstone and Revolution: the Passing of the Second Reform Bill, about the Reform Act 1867. This was published during its centenary and dedicated to "the Prime Minister", Labour leader Harold Wilson. Cowling challenged the traditional liberal assumptions over the reform crisis of the 1860s by arguing that the Liberal Party was not the straightforward progressive party that wanted to hand political power to the working-class and that the Conservatives did not promote reform in reaction to working-class pressure. Cowling instead placed much more importance on parliamentary manoeuvres. Robert Blake thought that this book "gives the most convincing account of what happened".

In 1971 appeared The Impact of Labour, which dealt with the years between 1920, after Labour won the Spen Valley by-election, and 1924 when the Conservatives won the general election of that year and ended the Liberal Party as a realistic party of government, with the Labour Party emerging as the Opposition.

Cowling believed the decisions and actions of “the politicians who mattered” (who, by his count, numbered a mere fifty or sixty) could not “be understood as derivative offshoots of pre-existing social conditions.” The historian’s job was therefore to “impute motive, intention and disingenuousness to the [political] actors whose personalities we have created out of the letters and speeches which survive.”

In 1975 appeared The Impact of Hitler, dealing with 1933 to 1940. Cowling has been described as an "isolationist imperialist" who argued that from Britain's point of view the Second World War was a "liberal war which had been entered into in a condition of moral indignation without the resources to fight it" and that it had been "providential good fortune which had placed the burden of fighting on the Russians and the Americans". He disapproved of the fact that the war was followed by a Labour electoral landslide, a greatly expanded welfare state and the liquidation of the British Empire.

The policy making process for Cowling is heavily influenced by party politics. Cowling was well known for his Primat der Innenpolitik ("primacy of domestic politics") explanations for British foreign policy; for example, he argued that the British "guarantee" of Poland issued on 31 March 1939 was advanced to improve the Conservatives' chances against Labour, and had nothing to do with foreign policy considerations. Cowling's approach is the opposite of the Primat der Außenpolitik ("primacy of foreign politics") thesis.

== Religion and Public Doctrine in Modern England ==
In 1980, 1985 and 2001 appeared the three volumes of Cowling's Religion and Public Doctrine in Modern England. The political history books required "tiring archival visits"; Cowling much preferred writing these. In researching for these books "He spent his days in his college rooms, muscularly grappling with books, indeed often physically ripping them apart. Made up of hundreds of essays on the thought of individuals, the work neither engaged with other scholarship nor developed an interpretative model for understanding modern Britain". Cowling placed Christianity squarely at the centre of English culture post-1840 and claimed that anti-Christians more often than not held traditional religious assumptions and prejudices. Secularisation was not so fast or complete as had been previously argued, but "defenders of orthodoxy as well as their assailants were subjected to pithy, provocative irony" by Cowling.

== Writings ==
=== Books ===
- The Nature and Limits of Political Science (Cambridge University Press, 1963).
- Mill and Liberalism (Cambridge University Press, 1963).
- 1867: Disraeli, Gladstone and Revolution. The Passing of the Second Reform Bill (Cambridge University Press, 1967).
- Selected Writings of John Stuart Mill (editor) (New American Library, 1968)
- The Impact of Labour. 1920–1924. The Beginning of Modern British Politics (Cambridge University Press, 1971).
- The Impact of Hitler. British Politics and British Policy. 1933–1940 (Cambridge University Press, 1975).
- Religion and Public Doctrine in Modern England Volume I (Cambridge University Press, 1980).
- Religion and Public Doctrine in Modern England. Volume II: Assaults (Cambridge University Press, 1985).
- A Conservative Future (Politeia, 1997).
- Religion and Public Doctrine in Modern England. Volume III: Accommodations (Cambridge University Press, 2001).

=== Essays ===
- ‘Reflections on Prof. Butterfield: a historian's movement towards theology’ [writing under the pseudonym Stafford Brignell], Varsity Supplement (6 November 1948), p. 5.
- 'The Language of Miss Himmelfarb', The Cambridge Review (25 October 1952).
- 'Mr Woodruff's Acton', The Cambridge Journal, vi (1952–53), pp. 181–4, 190.
- 'Politics, Economics and the Historical Tripos', The Cambridge Review (24 January 1959), pp. 246–8.
- 'Political Practice & Political Science', The Cambridge Review (6 February 1960).
- 'The Relevance of Natural Law', The Cambridge Review (4 June 1960).
- 'Lytton, the Cabinet & the Russians, August–November 1878', English Historical Review, LXXVI (January 1961).
- 'Mr Raymond Williams', The Cambridge Review (27 May 1961).
- 'Memoir of Reginald Frederick Cowling', Transactions of the Chartered Institute of Patent Agents, LXXXI (1962–63).
- '[Review of H. T. Lambrick, John Jacob of Jacobland]', English Historical Review, LXXIX (January 1964).
- 'The Use of Political Philosophy in Mill, Green, and Bentham', Historical Studies, v (1965).
- 'Disraeli, Derby and the Fusion, October 1865 – July 1866', Historical Journal, VIII (March 1965).
- 'The Social & Political Sciences – and How Many More? [with Philip Abrams and Edward Shils]', The Cambridge Review (2 February 1968).
- 'Mr. Powell, Mr. Heath, and the Future', in John Wood (ed.), Powell and the 1970 Election (Elliot Right Way Books, 1970), pp. 9–18.
- Conservative Essays (editor) (Cassell, 1978).
  - 'Preface', p. v.
  - 'The Present Position', pp. 1–24.
  - 'Conclusion', pp. 194–195.
- 'Herbert Butterfield 1900–1979', Proceedings of the British Academy, 65 (1980).
- 'Herbert Butterfield', in Lord Blake and C. S. Nicholls (eds.), Dictionary of National biography 1971–80 (Oxford University Press, 1986).
- 'One-and-a-half Cheers for Matthew Arnold', in Samuel Lipman (ed.), Culture and Anarchy (Yale University Press, 1994), pp. 202–212.

=== Articles ===
- 'War against Russia: a Suppressed Episode of 1876–7’, Manchester Guardian (16 July 1954).
- ‘Cyprus under Britain’, Manchester Guardian (13 August 1954).
- ‘The Cambridge Plan’ [re: the Spine-Relief Road], Manchester Guardian (18 August 1954).
- 'Liberal?', Manchester Guardian (25 August 1954).
- 'Problems of Orthodoxy' [review of M. Richter, Politics of Conscience and R. S. Downie, Government Action & Morality in the Democratic State], The Spectator (25 September 1964).
- 'Intellectuals and the Tory Party', The Spectator (8 March 1968).
- 'A Letter to Humphrey Berkeley', The Spectator (26 April 1968).
- 'There's been a revolution here, too', The Spectator (24 May 1968).
- 'Two Tiers for the Universities', The Spectator (30 May 1969).
- 'The politics of Free-marketeers' [writing under the pseudonym 'A Conservative'], The Spectator (10 October 1970).
- 'A Strong Line?' [writing under the pseudonym 'A Conservative'], The Spectator (17 October 1970).
- 'Raising the Tone' [writing under the pseudonym 'A Conservative'], The Spectator (24 October 1970).
- 'Heath's Assault' [writing under the pseudonym 'A Conservative'], The Spectator (31 October 1970).
- 'Conservative Dangers Ahead' [writing under the pseudonym 'A Conservative'], The Spectator (21 November 1970).
- 'Europe' [writing under the pseudonym 'A Conservative'], The Spectator (28 November 1970).
- 'Moving to the Right?' [writing under the pseudonym 'A Conservative'], The Spectator (5 December 1970).
- 'The Intellectual Treason?' [writing under the pseudonym 'A Conservative'], The Spectator (19 December 1970).
- 'The Rightness of Indecision' [writing under the pseudonym 'A Conservative'], The Spectator (16 January 1971).
- 'The Labour Party and its Future' [writing under the pseudonym 'A Conservative'], The Spectator (13 February 1971).
- 'Ulster and Mr Powell' [writing under the pseudonym 'A Conservative'], The Spectator (27 March 1971).
- 'Replying to the Marketeers' [writing under the pseudonym 'A Conservative'], The Spectator (5 June 1971).
- 'The Senior Conservative, the Party and Mr Heath' [writing under the pseudonym 'A Conservative'], The Spectator (19 June 1971).
- 'Corn-treading' [writing under the pseudonym 'A Conservative'], The Spectator (21 August 1971).
- 'Acid Test of the New Conservatism', The Daily Telegraph (5 October 1976).
- 'The "Liberal Mind"', The Times Literary Supplement (3 June 1977).
- 'Sir Stuart Hampshire and the Public Realm', The Times Higher Education Supplement (16 October 1981).
- 'Place for Women?' [at Peterhouse], The Sunday Times (6 March 1983).
- 'The Wapping Prof' [Unsigned profile of J. R. Vincent], The Spectator (22 March 1986).
- 'The Nasty Mind of George Orwell', The Sunday Telegraph (22 November 1987).
- 'Why we should not have gone to war' [in 1939], The Sunday Telegraph (20 August 1989).
- 'Raymond Williams in Retrospect', The New Criterion (February 1990).
- 'A Reply' in 'Discussion. Maurice Cowling's "New Right", Encounter (March 1990), p. 72.
- 'Ethics of the Iron Liberal' [Mrs. Thatcher], The Guardian (19 November 1990).
- 'The Mandarin and the Meritocrat' [Hurd and Major], The Sunday Telegraph (25 November 1990).
- 'What they think of the PM' [symposium], The Sunday Telegraph (3 March 1991).
- 'How he could be Right', The Sunday Telegraph (17 March 1991).
- 'The Right Kind of Idealism', The Sunday Telegraph (14 April 1991).
- 'New tax, old dangers', The Sunday Telegraph (28 April 1991).
- 'New Life for the universities', The Sunday Telegraph (26 May 1991).
- 'Way ahead for the Tories' [re: Europe], The Sunday Telegraph (28 July 1991).
- 'Contribution' [to symposium of advice for Neil Kinnock], The Guardian (24 May 1991).
- 'Author as mirror to the soul' [Carlyle], The Times Higher Education Supplement (27 March 1992).
- 'Now the battle begins' [i.e. after the general election], The Sunday Telegraph (12 April 1992).
- 'Virtuous Machiavellian' [review of Geoffrey Elton, The English], The Times (19 November 1992).
- 'History and Joseph Needham', The New Criterion (February 1993).
- '[Review of C. C. O'Brien, The Great Melody]', The Wall Street Journal (18 April 1993).
- 'Finding a role for compassion' [review of Michael Portillo, The Ghost of Toryism Past], The Spectator (6 December 1997).
- 'Rushing to judgment' [review of Hywel Williams, Guilty Men], The Spectator (23 May 1998).
- 'A liberal icon' [review of Michael Ignatieff, Isaiah Berlin], The Spectator (17 October 1998)
- 'The intelligent populist' [profile of Niall Ferguson], The Spectator (30 January 1999).
- 'Trotskyism at bath spa' [George Orwell], The Spectator (20 March 1999).
- 'The 1980s Tory boys now', The Spectator (26 June 1999).
- 'Piecemeal social engineering' [review of Karl Popper, All Life is Problem Solving and Ian Jarvie and Sandra Pralong (eds.), Popper's Open Society After Fifty Years], The Spectator (18 September 1999).
