= John Sykes (politician) =

British Conservative politician

John David Sykes (born 24 August 1956) is a British Conservative politician.

== Parliamentary career ==
Sykes contested Sheffield Hillsborough at the 1987 general election, being beaten into third place.

He was the Member of Parliament (MP) for Scarborough from 1992 to 1997. Following boundary changes at the 1997 general election, Sykes contested the redrawn seat of Scarborough and Whitby, but lost to the Labour candidate, Lawrie Quinn, by 5,124 votes. He re-fought the seat in 2001, but was again beaten by Quinn.

Parliament of the United Kingdom
Preceded by Sir Michael Shaw	Member of Parliament for Scarborough; 1992–1997	constituency abolished
