= Latham baronets =

Title in the Baronetage of United Kingdom

The Latham Baronetcy, of Crow Clump in Walton-upon-Thames in the County of Surrey, was a title in the Baronetage of the United Kingdom.

It was created on 24 May 1919 for Thomas Latham. He was Joint managing Director and Deputy Chairman of Courtaulds and also gave service to the Ministry of Pensions during the First World War. The second Baronet represented Scarborough and Whitby in the House of Commons as a Conservative from 1931 to 1941. He was court-martialled and found guilty of ten charges of indecent conduct and of attempted suicide and was discharged dishonourably and imprisoned for two years without hard labour. Latham's court-martial was the first time a sitting MP who was also in the army had been court-martialled since Lieutenant-General Sir John Murray in 1815. The baronetcy became extinct with the death of the 3rd Baronet in 2022 due to him having only daughters.

== Latham baronets, of Crow Clump (1919) ==
- Sir Thomas Paul Latham, 1st Baronet (1855–1931)
- Sir (Herbert) Paul Latham, 2nd Baronet (1905–1955)
- Sir Richard Thomas Paul Latham, 3rd Baronet (1934–2022)
