= Alison Hume =

British politician and TV writer

Alison Hume MP
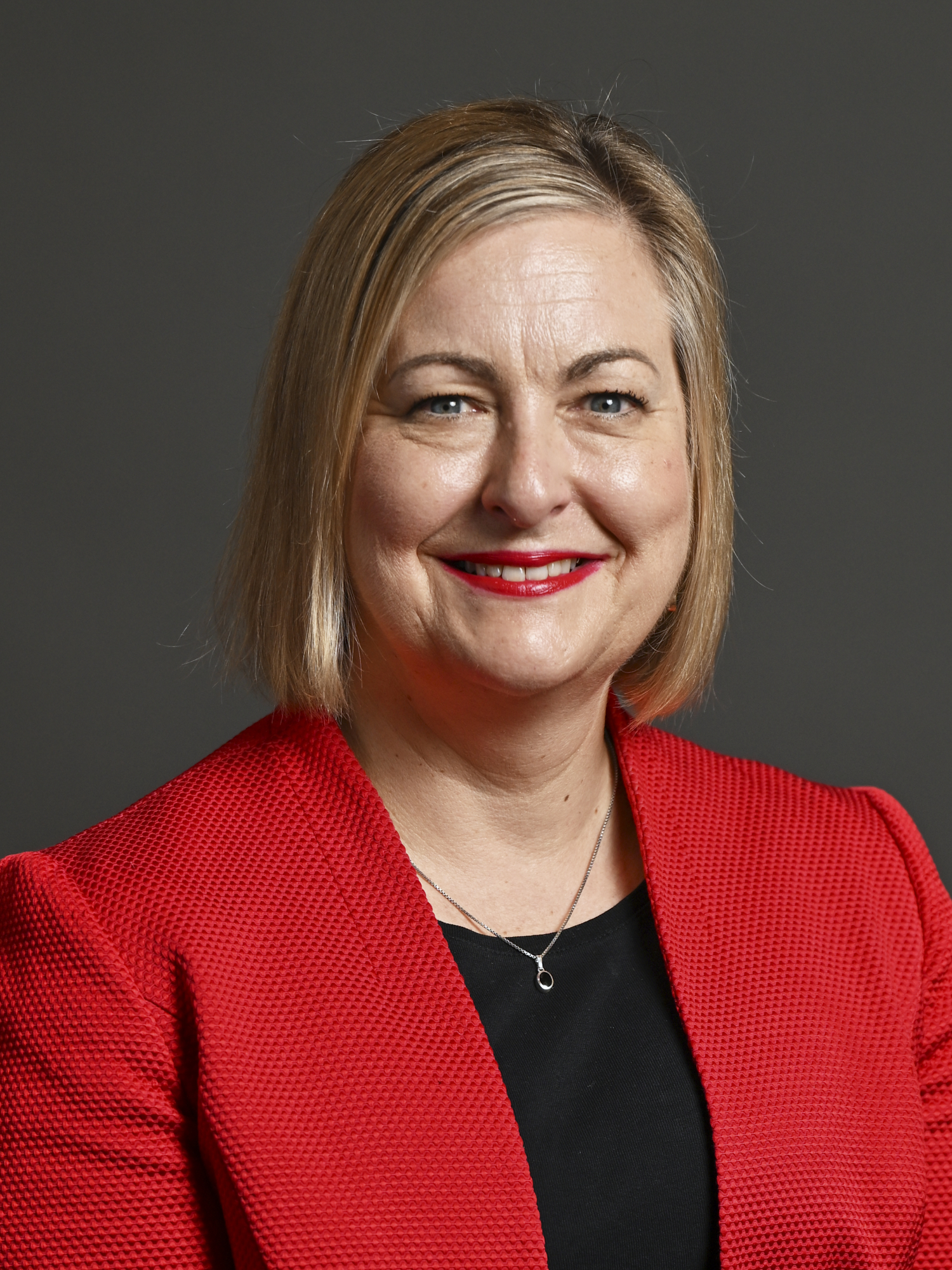
- Official portrait, 2024

Member of Parliament for Scarborough and Whitby
- Incumbent
- Assumed office 4 July 2024
- Preceded by: Robert Goodwill
- Majority: 5,408 (12.3%)

Personal details
- Born: Bushey, Hertfordshire, England
- Party: Labour
- Education: Northern Film School
- Website: www.alisonhume.com
- Writing career
- Occupation: Screenwriter
- Genres: Science-fiction; fantasy; crime drama

Alison Louise Hume is a British Labour Party politician and television writer who has been Member of Parliament (MP) for Scarborough and Whitby since 2024. In television she is known for her work as creator and executive producer of the CBBC series The Sparticle Mystery and the BBC drama Rocket Man.

== Early life ==
Hume was born in Bushey and grew up in Essex, with her father, an accountant, being originally from York. She moved back to Yorkshire with her parents, when they retired, moving to Poppleton.

== Writing ==
Hume attended the Northern Film School and trained on a Carlton new writers' course. She worked as a television and film screenwriter, writing among others, the 2003 feature film Pure, and the 2005 TV movie Beaten. She had her own production company, which produced the CBBC shows Summerhill and The Sparticle Mystery, both of which she wrote.

In 2025 Hume was one of the judges of the 'Self-Published Novel' category of the Comedy Women in Print Prize.

== Politics ==
Following her second son being born with a rare chromosomal disorder, Hume became a disability rights campaigner, eventually co-founding York Accessibility Action. It was through her activism that she entered formal politics. At the 2019 European Parliament election, Hume stood as a candidate for the Labour Party in the Yorkshire and the Humber constituency. In 2019 she unsuccessfully stood to be the Labour candidate for Rother Valley Hume was also a candidate in the 2021 election for the North Yorkshire Police, Fire and Crime Commissioner. In 2023, she was selected as the Labour Party candidate for Scarborough and Whitby at the 2024 general election, a contest that she won with a majority of over 5,000.

== Filmography ==
Production	Notes	Broadcaster
Pure	Feature film (2002)	—N/a
The Vice	2 episodes (2002–2003)	ITV
New Tricks	"Home Truths" (2004)	BBC
Beaten	TV movie (2005)	BBC
Rocket Man	3 episodes (2005)	BBC
Roman Mysteries	2 episodes (2007)	BBC
Summerhill	TV movie (2008)	CBBC
The Sparticle Mystery	36 episodes (2011–2015)	CBBC
Holby City	1 episode (2019)	BBC
So Awkward	1 episode (2019)	CBBC
Jamie Johnson	2 episodes (2020)	CBBC

== Awards ==
Year	Award	Category	Recipients	Result
2008	British Academy Children's Awards	Children's: Drama	Alison Hume (with Stephen Smallwood and Jon East), for Summerhill	Nominated
2008	British Academy Children's Awards	Children's: Writer	Alison Hume, for Summerhill	Won
2008	Royal Television Society Awards	Writer of the Year	Alison Hume, for Summerhill	Won
2015	Royal Television Society Awards – Yorkshire	Writer – Drama	Alison Hume, for The Sparticle Mystery	Nominated

Parliament of the United Kingdom
Preceded by Robert Goodwill	Member of Parliament for Scarborough and Whitby; 2024–present	Incumbent
