= The Sparticle Mystery =

British television series

- Title card
- Genre: Science fiction Drama; Teen drama Adventure
- Starring: Abigail Hardingham; Karim Zeroual; Emily Sanderson; Grace Mandeville; Karene Peter (Series 2–3); Abbie Hayes; Gerran Howell; Oliver Bell (Series 1–2); Gia Lodge O'Meally (Series 3); Adam Scotland (Series 3); Stephanie Dale (Series 3); Oliver Dillon
- Composer: Sheridan Tongue
- Country of origin: United Kingdom
- Original language: English
- No. of series: 3
- No. of episodes: 36

Production
- Executive producers: Alison Hume; Stephen Smallwood
- Running time: 28 minutes
- Production companies: Sparticles Productions; Ingenious Broadcasting

Original release
- Network: CBBC; BBC HD
- Release: 14 February 2011 – 30 March 2015

The Sparticle Mystery is a British science fiction television series written and created by Alison Hume and produced by Sparticles Productions for CBBC. The series follows a group of ten children in modern Britain, where an experiment at a Large Hadron Collider-like facility, the Sparticle Project, goes wrong, sending anybody aged 15 and over into a parallel dimension at exactly 11:11 am. The children travel to the Sparticle Project in an attempt to bring back the adults and re-align the two dimensions.

The series, which had a budget of £3 million, was filmed in and around Bristol, with the final episode filmed at the ISIS neutron source particle accelerators, near Didcot. Series 2 was extremely popular, with over 2 million hits on BBC iPlayer. Series 3 regularly topped the BARB top ten children's shows during transmission. In general, the series has received mixed to positive reception, with a score of 7.3 on IMDb.

The programme, which stars Annette Badland as Doomsday Dora/Holodora, has similar themes to both the 1975 TV series The Changes and the Gone series, and has many similarities to The Tribe; however, it is noted for its difference in that the children desire to bring back the adults. The second series of The Sparticle Mystery was filmed across Yorkshire in July- September 2012 and broadcast in 2013. A third series was filmed in 2014 in and around Belfast, Northern Ireland with the support of Northern Ireland Screen, and the first episode was broadcast on 5 January 2015. The third and final series ended on 30 March 2015. Video-on-demand rights to The Sparticle Mystery were acquired by Amazon UK Prime in 2015 and Series 1 & 2 were available to watch until 2017. In the US, Seasons 1 and 2 are available from Netflix. Series 3 is available on the BBC Store.

In 2019, The Sparticle Mystery Series 1 was available to watch on BBC iPlayer in the UK, but as of 2025, it is no longer available.

== Synopsis ==
=== Series 1 ===
The Sparticle Mystery follows a group of 11 children left to fend for themselves within modern-day Earth after a science experiment at 'The Sparticle Project' goes wrong, resulting in all those of age 15 and over disappearing into a parallel universe, at precisely 11:11 a.m.

Initially, the world becomes their personal playground. With adults' rules, laws and orders all removed, youngsters enjoy complete freedom, leading to them raiding sweetshops, etc. However, as the world's resources start to dwindle and daily survival gets harder, the youngsters resolve to bring the adults back by venturing to the top secret 'Sparticle Project'. They are aided in their quest by a number of clues left before the disappearance of a woman named 'Doomsday' Dora, a scientist who worked on the Sparticle Project. Along the way they have many adventures and learn important life skills.

Early in episode one we discover that in this 'post-disappearance' world, opportunistic gangs soon come to inhabit the streets. This prompts the lead male character Sadiq to usher his newly formed tribe to safety in the City Hotel. After discovering her Mum and older sister missing, a scientifically minded young girl called Kat takes charge of Liam, the small boy next door. They too try to gain entry to the City Hotel, but only Liam gets in, leaving Kat to initially fend for herself, before Sadiq caves in and allows her entry. One of the tribe, a young girl called Reese, soon starts to experience strange events, which eventually turn out to be the manifestation of her own latent psychic powers.

Kat and Reese quickly deduce that the Sparticle Project is behind the adults' disappearance. The 'Sparticles' tribe then split in two: the 'Ranchers', Tia and Jeffrey (who has cerebral palsy), who stay at City Hotel with the two younger kids, Liam and Frankie, and the 'Questers', (Sadiq, Kat, Jordan, Ami, Holly and Reese), who go in search of the Sparticle Project. Also featured is Callum, a tough streetwise young teen, who appears to be the Sparticles' enemy at first, but later joins their side. When a girl living at The Sparticle Project interferes with the machine, Reese and Muna, another child with special powers trapped between dimensions, step in to try and fix the problem, but Kat chooses Reese over the adults and shuts down the machine permanently. Before she disappears, Doomsday Dora tells the Questers to travel to the Quantum Nexus and gives them a mysterious key.

=== Series 2 ===
One year later, the team continue to attempt to bring back the adults by locating the Quantum Nexus after it is discovered that the key unlocks a further clue leading to specific treasures that will guide the children there. It quickly becomes a race between the Sparticles (except Kat, Ami, Jordan and Holly) and Fizzy's deputy Serena, who is joined by Holly. Along the way, the Sparticles discover more children have powers like Reese, and name them "Sensitives." After following clues relating to the "Artos" tribe, the Sparticles are joined by Serena, who was secretly a double agent, in stopping Fizzy, Ernesto and Holly from destroying the Quantum Nexus with Reese, who switches sides after receiving a warning from Muna. Reese interferes with the process of reuniting the children's and the adults’ dimension using her sensitive powers and the adults arrive at the children's dimension as teenagers.

=== Series 3 ===
In the third season, the world is taken over by the newly arrived Queen Kylie, who locks up the remaining Sparticles (Sadiq, Reese, Serena, Holly and Frankie). Kylie's brother Erimon releases the Sparticles but is unable to recapture them, and the Sparticles (joined by the sensitive Aris, Holly's teen mother Kim and Ernesto) embark on a mission to rid the world of the Teen Parents and send them home to the 1980s. While travelling around the country in one of Queen Kylie's stolen tracker vans, Reese discovers "The Circle of Perpetual Time" which, when 7 sensitives are linked up with it, will be able to send the parents home using the power of an energy-boosting Comet. Holly becomes pregnant with Ernesto's child, who turns out to be the final sensitive. In the end, the Sparticles eventually bring the teen parents to their dimensions and bring back the parents.

== Cast and characters ==
Top (left to right)-Holly, Ami, Liam, Bottom(left to right)-Reese, Kat, Sadiq, Tia, Frankie, Jordan, Jeffrey

The main characters in The Sparticle Mystery are all children, of different ages and ethnic groups, many of whom were new to acting. Included in the main cast were: 16-year-old Megan Jones as Tia; 8-year-old Oliver Bell as Liam; Wesley Nelson (who has cerebral palsy) as Jeffrey; Karim Zeroual as Sadiq. Due to the age of the actors there were large changes in the cast between series. Given the premise of the show, the adult cast was minimal, but notable is Annette Badland as 'Doomsday' Dora, and Larissa Wilson as Anita.

Actor	Character	Series	Duration	First appearance	Last appearance
Abigail Hardingham	Kat	1	1x01-1x13	The Disappearance	The Sparticle Project
Zachary Middleton	Ami	1	1x01-1x13	The Disappearance	The Sparticle Project
Iestyn Darmanin	Jordan	1	1x01-1x13	The Disappearance	The Sparticle Project
Chris Draper	Henry	1	1x05	The Funfair	The Funfair
Annette Badland	Doomsday Dora	1	1x03-1x13	The Message	The Sparticle Project
Larissa Wilson	Anita	1	1x03, 1x08	The Message	The Unsuitables
Megan Jones	Tia	1–2	1x01-2x10	The Disappearance	The Quantum Nexus
Wesley Nelson	Jeffrey	1–2	1x01-2x10	The Disappearance	The Quantum Nexus
Jerome Holder	Callum	1–2	1x01-1x02, 1x04, 1x08-2x10	The Disappearance	The Quantum Nexus
Oliver Bell	Liam	1–2	1x01-2x10	The Disappearance	The Quantum Nexus
Lee Worswick	Rocky	2	2x02-2x07	The Decoder	The Traders
Connor Ryan	Fury	2	2x01-2x08	The Stone Head	The Stone of Artos
Maia Tamrakar	Muna	1–2	1x05-1x13, 2x08-2x10	The Funfair	The Quantum Nexus
Finton Flynn	Huen	2	2x04-2x06	The Peace City	The Sword and the Stone
Karim Zeroual	Sadiq	1–3	1x01-3x13	The Disappearance	The Circle of Perpetual Time
Karene Peter	Serena	2–3	2x01-3x13	The Stone Head	The Circle of Perpetual Time
Emily Sanderson	Reese	1–3	1x01-3x13	The Disappearance	The Circle of Perpetual Time
Grace Mandeville	Holly	1–3	1x02-3x13	The Invasion	The Circle of Perpetual Time
Abbie Hayes	Frankie	1–3	1x01-3x13	The Disappearance	The Circle of Perpetual Time
Gerran Howell	Ernesto	1–3	1x08, 2x04, 2x08-3x13	The Unsuitables	The Circle of Perpetual Time
Adam Scotland	Aris	3	3x01-3x13	The Neuroscrambler	The Circle of Perpetual Time
Stephanie Dale	Kim	3	3x01-3x13	The Neuroscrambler	The Circle of Perpetual time
Carrie Lambe	Kylie	3	3x01-3x13	The Neuroscrambler	The Circle of Perpetual time
Ernest Kingsley Junior	Orion	3	3x03-3x13	The Trading Post	The Circle of Perpetual time
Jessica Bell	Dora	3	3x01-3x13	The Neuroscrambler	The Circle of Perpetual time
Kit Garner	Erimon	3	3x01-3x13	The Neuroscrambler	The Circle of Perpetual time
Oliver Dillon	Fizzy	1–3	1x11, 2x01- 3x13	The Hot Zone	The Circle of Perpetual Time
Ross McCormack	Bryan	3	3x01-3x13	The Neuroscrambler	The Circle of Perpetual time
Annette Badland	HoloDora	2–3	2×10, 3x04, 3x07-3x13	The Quantum Nexus	The Circle of Perpetual Time
Thady Graham	Lucie	3	3x06, 3x12-3x13	The Wild Things	The Circle of Perpetual Time
Archie Aaron	Jason	3	3x07, 3x12-3x13	The Zone	The Circle of Perpetual Time
Thomas Copeland	Yanx	3	3x10, 3x12-3x13	The Haunting	The Circle of Perpetual Time
J. J. Murphy	The Keeper	3	3x12-3x13	The Keeper	The Circle of Perpetual Time
Ciaran McCourt	Rat	3	3x02-3x05	The Bounty Hunters	The Teen Father
Niomi Liberante	Jenna	3	3x02-3x03	The Bounty Hunters	The Trading Post

== Series overview ==
Series	Episodes	Originally aired	
Series	Episodes	First aired	Last aired
1	13	14 February 2011	6 March 2011
2	10	11 February 2013	22 February 2013
3	13	5 January 2015	30 March 2015

== Episode list ==
=== Series 1 (2011) ===
No.	Title	Written by	Original release date
1	"The Disappearance"	Alison Hume	14 February 2011
When a group of children return to the surface after a day out trip to the caves that they won, every single person over 15 has disappeared. Meanwhile, Kat, her mum and her sister argue. She turns around and find out that they, too, are gone. The kids who'd been in the cave – Ami, Sadiq, Reese, Jordan and Callum – take a car to see what is going on but while going to the police station, Callum decides to leave. Sadiq calls for him and Callum almost hits Sadiq with a brick on purpose. They leave the car and enter a supermarket at Ami's request. Kat finds her next door neighbor, Liam, trapped in his room because his mother grounded him for 5 minutes. As his mother disappeared with the rest of the adults, she was unable to let him out. Kat gets him out and they find an ice cream van. After she gives Liam an ice cream, they head to the supermarket. Just before Sadiq puts his hand in the till, Kat appears and confronts him. The group (Sadiq, Jordan, Ami and Reese) then go to get Sadiq's stepsister, Frankie, and his neighbor, Tia, at his house and Jordan's brother, Jeffrey, who has cerebral palsy, at his school. The group then head to a hotel and lock out all of the other kids who are trying to get in, including Kat and Liam. Note: First Appearance of Kat, Sadiq, Tia, Jeffrey, Jordan, Reece, Ami, Jordan, Frankie, Liam and Callum.
2	"The Invasion"	Alison Hume	15 February 2011
Callum's new gang intend to take over the City Hotel, using Kat to gain access. Meanwhile, Reese visits the library to learn more about the Sparticle Project, and sees 'ghosts' of the adults there. Later the two find out the adults are still there but in another dimension. The group meets a girl named Holly, who was staying in the hotel when the adults disappeared. Note: First Appearance of Holly.
3	"The Message"	Alison Hume	16 February 2011
While visiting the university to find food, Reese discovers a message from Professor Dora Petty, better known as Doomsday Dora, explaining how the adults disappeared and urging the children to help them return. Meanwhile, Holly is held hostage by the only remaining adult, Anita, who received a heart transplant, and as a result of having received the heart of a fourteen year old was not sent to the parallel dimension with the other adults. Note: Guest Appearance of Doomsday Dora and Anita. Note: Callum is absent for this episode
4	"The Quest"	Debbie Moon	17 February 2011
Doomsday Dora's message has warned the children they must reunite the two parallel worlds quickly or adults and children will remain separated permanently. The children decide to choose who goes on the road to the Sparticle Project and who stays behind to look after Liam and Frankie by an 'Apprentice'-style challenge to source power for the City Hotel. They eventually appoint Kat and Sadiq as joint leaders of the ‘Questers’, who search for the Sparticle Project (Kat, Sadiq, Holly, Jordan, Ami and Reese) and Jeffrey and Tia as leaders of the ‘Ranchers’ (Jeffrey, Tia, Liam and Frankie), who remain at the hotel. Note: Guest Appearance of Doomsday Dora
5	"The Funfair"	Alison Hume	21 February 2011
The Questers discover a fairground, where Jordan, Holly and Ami take being kids way too far, and nearly kill themselves on a runaway waltzer, until Muna (a child caught between the parallel worlds) comes to the rescue. The lack of grid power has led to the failure of the national water supply. Fresh water becomes the latest challenge for the Ranchers, and Frankie goes native in her attempts to find and save the precious resource. Note: Guest Appearance of Muna and Doomsday Dora Note: Callum is absent for this episode
6	"The Big Freeze"	Debbie Moon	22 February 2011
A postcode given to Reese via Psychic Sarah at the fairground leads the Questers to a simulator where scientists were trained how to run the Sparticle Project. Ami, Jordan and Holly get trapped in the room with the prototype collider's super-cooling systems running and the temperature plummeting towards absolute zero. At the City Hotel, a fox has been at the chickens and the children decide to trap it. This is very tricky, but when they finally track down the animal and are set to destroy it, they decide on a better course of action. Note: Callum is absent for this episode
7	"The Water Rats"	Alison Hume	23 February 2011
While the team are on their way to the Sparticle Project, Ami is captured in the woods by the Water Rats – a group who love life messing around on the river. The Water Rats are at war with the Menaces – and the Questers, persuaded by Ami, decide to help. Will Ami swap the seriousness of the Quest for a kid's life of fun and games? Meanwhile, Jeffrey is keen to help out more, but his wheelchair needs more power. Tia and Jeffrey discover a satellite communication system which allows them to send a message into the ether, asking anyone out there for the batteries Jeffrey needs. They arrive back at the hotel to a package − it is from Anita at the university and it comes with a message. Note: Callum is absent for this episode
8	"The Unsuitables"	Alison Hume	24 February 2011
The Questers are intrigued by Head Boy Jeremy and his posh boarding school. However, they are soon locked out and Jordan is forced to leave the tribe to become a true public school believer. Camped outside the school, ex-pupils Ernesto and his rebel gang recruit the Sparticles to overthrow Jeremy's regime and rescue the Unsuitables – the 'less-than-perfects' who do the dirty work for Jeremy and his cadets. The Ranchers at the City Hotel work out how to bypass the first door at the Sparticle Project. Working with Anita at the university, they come up with an ingenious solution, but now they need to get the key to the Questers out on the road. Callum, who is keen to impress Kat, offers to collect the key and bring it to the Questers. Note: Guest Appearance of Ernesto and Anita (Final appearance)
9	"The Harvest"	Jonny Kurzman	28 February 2011
The Questers on their way to the Sparticle Project discover a bucolic village run on communal principals. Reese 'sees' Muna again and with the help of Tamsin, one of the village kids, Kat figures out that the wormhole events are occurring at points where laylines intersect. Some of the Questers, however, have been caught red-handed stealing food and are made to stand trial in the children's court where the issue is whether stealing to survive is justified. Jeffrey is proud of his abundant garden, but when a few hungry girls turn up at the hotel, he finds himself at war. Note: Guest Appearance of Muna Note: Callum is absent in this episode
10	"The Fallout"	Jonny Kurzman	1 March 2011
The Ranchers have invited a tribe of seriously idle girls into their hotel. As they take advantage of the hotel and the Ranchers, the Ranchers are forced to fight back − but who will be turfed out of their home? Holly is anxious when she realizes the journey to the Sparticle Project is coming to its conclusion. She leaves her fellow Questers trapped in an underground nuclear bunker, but there is another force at work. A computer which thinks there has been a nuclear war competes against the ingenuity of the children in a battle of wits. Note: Callum is absent for this episode
11	"The Hot Zone"	Jonny Kurzman	2 March 2011
The Questers discover an alarming new threat. Without the adults, and the automatic cooling systems, the world's nuclear power plants are melting down and threaten to destroy the earth. The Questers have to get a message to the adults – but how? Callum arrives to collect the key to the Sparticle Project from the Ranchers, only to discover them homeless. Tia and Jeffrey don't trust Callum after past encounters. Unfortunately, the key has been lost and sold, and Callum is the only hope to getting it back and to reuniting them with their friends. Note: Guest Appearance of Fizzy.
12	"The Emergency"	Alison Hume	3 March 2011
Ami lapses into a diabetic coma and the Questers rush him to hospital to find some insulin. Switching a generator on in the hospital may just have cost one baby his life. The kids running the hospital need fuel to run the generators to keep the babies alive. Aware of the ticking clock to get to the Project but desperate to put things right, the Questers undertake a dangerous mission as a solution. They have to distract a German shepherd dog who is guarding a yard full of petrol lorries. Meanwhile, it is Tia's fifteenth birthday. Will she be transported to join the adults in a parallel dimension?
13	"The Sparticle Project"	Alison Hume	6 March 2011
The Questers and Ranchers are reunited at Black Tor Mine where the adults were separated from the children by the machine of the Sparticle Project. But another tribe – the Mystic Moles, who are the children of the scientists working there – won't let anyone through the doors. Callum arrives with the dictaphone, the key to opening the Sparticle Project. The Sparticles face a series of challenges before they get to their greatest obstacle. Although they are successful reuniting the worlds, the two worlds are still unstable. Elsewhere, Reese and Holly came across a electricity leak. Reese and Muna use their powers to hold the electricity in place. But the reunification process takes too long and destroys Muna. Reese tries to hold the electricity in place on her own, despite Holly's protests. In the control room, Kat, Sadiq and the adults watch the event while Liam, Frankie, Ami, Jordan, Jeffrey and Dora attempt to hold the Luminite, a mineral that magnifies energy, in place to fix the damage caused to the Sparticle Project by the misinformed Mystic Meg, leader of the Mystic Moles. Kat tries to convince her dad to shut down the Sparticle Project and save Reese. The other adults attempt to stop him, but he shuts down the project, saving Reese. This disrupts the realignment process and the two worlds split again. Doomsday Dora tells the Questers to travel to the Quantum Nexus (hinting a second series). Just before Kat's dad disappears, he gives her a code to shut down the world's nuclear power plants. Sadiq comforts her about the failed realignment. The Sparticles regroup and Liam suggests the group should journey to the Quantum Nexus and attempt to bring the adults back again. Note: Final Appearance of Kat, Jordan and Ami. Note: Guest Appearance of Muna, Doomsday Dora and Professor Henry Barker.

=== Series 2 (2013) ===
No.	Title	Written by	Original release date
1	"The Stone Head"	Alison Hume	11 February 2013
After a year of searching for the Quantum Nexus, most of the tribe has split up. Jordan and Ami have gone to France, Kat is sorting out the nuclear power plants but everyone else reunites when they realize the key from Doomsday Dora fits into a stone head. Unfortunately, the head is in a stadium owned by Fizzy and there is also the matter that there is a traitor within their tribe. Reese is captured and the dims threaten to feed her to the lion if the Sparticles lose the competition between Fizzy’s Dim Army and The Sparticles to win the key to the Quantum Nexus. The lion is revealed to be a hoax and Holly is revealed to be the traitor, accepting a bag of Fizzys for doing a job for Fizzy. She vows to find the Quantum Nexus first and destroy it to ensure the adults never return. She and Serena take off and the Sparticles take the Stone Head back to the Spartivan and set off on a race to the Quantum Nexus. Note: first appearance of Serena and Fury and first main appearance of Fizzy.
2	"The Decoder"	Joe Williams	12 February 2013
The Sparticles and Holly and Serena arrive at the museum that the stone head belongs to and plan to decode the message on the Stone Head, but the Sparticles get caught up in a plan with another tribe, the Featherheads, to raid the museum in order to get gold to melt down to turn into Fizzys to use to buy fuel. Holly and Serena break into the museum and use an ogham has decoder to translate the message on the Stone Head, which was written on a piece of paper that they stole from Reese. While Jeffery and a member of the Featherheads work on a machine turning waste into fuel, the remaining Featherheads rob the gold from the museum, including the Decoder. Reese attempts to get it back but is caught in the diggers bucket and is nearly killed. The Sparticles chase the digger down the road but it gets stuck and Reese drops the Decoder. The digger destroys the Decoder and Rocky drops the bucket and lets Reese out. Before they leave, Reese reveals that before it was destroyed, she saw the message decoded. They leave, and Rocky's brother finds a note stating that he has stowed away with the Sparticles to get their mum back. Note: first appearance of Rocky. Note: Fizzy and Fury are absent in this episode.
3	"The White Horse"	Dan Berlinka	13 February 2013
The Sparticles and Holly and Serena bump into a circus tribe while searching for the white horse. For Serena, will it be a happy reunion with her sister? Note: Tia, Callum, and Fizzy are absent in this episode.
4	"The Peace City"	Alison Hume	14 February 2013
The Sparticles, Holly and Serena all go to Peace City on their way to the River Artos. As Reese is being pulled through as she tells Sadiq, "Peace City might be the Quantum Nexus." Holly and Serena lose the sword (which is taken by Rocky in disguise). Fizzy puts up wanted posters for the Sparticles. Reese meets another person who has special powers named Huen. Tensions rise as Ernesto and Callum arrive. As Holly and Serena exit, Holly spots the sword and shows Serena it hadn't dissolved in the acid bath. She grabs it and they decide to head off for Water Mint Mill. Note: first appearance of Huen and guest appearance of Ernesto.
5	"The Creature"	Alison Hume	15 February 2013
The Sparticles travel to an abandoned mill where a supposed creature has been eating children. There, Tia and Jeffrey's relationship comes under strain and Rocky shows his true colors as he snatches the necklace Tia gave to Jeffrey and throws it in the River blaming Jeffery for the incident. The Sparticles get their next clue, which leads them closer to the Quantum Nexus. Note: Callum, Fizzy and Fury are absent in this episode.
6	"The Sword and the Stone"	Dan Berlinka	18 February 2013
The Sparticles find the stone which opens the Quantum Nexus but Jeffrey gets poisoned by itcyflax flower so therefore the Sparticles go to a castle to get a treatment but Holly messed up their car so Holly and Serena have to give them a ride to a castle that has the cure but the Sparticles and Holly and Serena soon get caught up in duels when they lose their sword. Note: final appearance of Huen. Note: Fizzy and Fury are absent in this episode.
7	"The Traders"	Joe Williams	19 February 2013
A tribe of Traders lock up the Sparticles and accuse them of stealing their shipment which was to be given to Fizzy. They soon discover that the shipment was chocolate and that Fizzy is going to make an army using these. Serena and Holly are then captured and put into a room as the Traders thought they were Sparticles. After an escape planned by Frankie, Liam and Reese, they tried to rescue the others but were unfortunately captured again but Frankie and Liam escaped and found the balaclava and shipment and they discover that it's Skinny as he was 'sick' of taking orders from his boss. He is then arrested by Callum for breaking one of the rules but soon freed to help the Sparticles. Rocky stayed behind to help the Sparticles rather than Callum. Fizzy turns up and the chocolate is melted and Rocky tells to stay off the Quantum Nexus and the Sparticles to get chocolate and biscuits and it was agreed except of Fizzy who was frustrated. The Sparticles get the treasures back and are going to try to find the Stone of Artos. Note: final appearance of Rocky.
8	"The Stone of Artos"	Alison Hume	20 February 2013
The Treasure Hunt is coming together with the discovery of another vital clue in the race to the Quantum Nexus, but the return of Ernesto leads to questions – exactly whose side is the Rebel on? Later on, Reese sees Muna and it is revealed that Muna came back in limbo at the Sparticle Mystery. Muna also tells Reese that it is dangerous to realign the 2 worlds as there are many more dimensions that could destroy them. Later on, it is discovered that Sadiq tells the other Sparticles that Serena is a double agent. Note: first main appearance of Ernesto and guest appearance of Muna. Note: final appearance of Fury.
9	"The Silver Forest"	Alison Hume	21 February 2013
A trail is laid for the Treasure Hunt, but the two competing teams start falling apart. Loyalties become strained and old rivals become new friends. Holly understood the last letter of the last episode and is teamed up with Serena. Holly soon discovers that Serena is on the Sparticles' side rather than hers. Holly leaves her hurt by the riverside (Serena was hurt after a cut from the sword) and teams up with Ernesto and Fizzy and is soon joined by Reese to destroy the Quantum Nexus. They now make a group called The Freedom 4. The Sparticles soon find Serena using the tennis balls to guide them and discover the others are already ahead in the Quantum Nexus. Jeffrey stays behind to help Serena while the others go ahead and discover the Quantum Nexus.
10	"The Quantum Nexus"	Alison Hume	22 February 2013
The Sparticles reach the Quantum Nexus at last and the race is on to see if they can bring back the adults or stay in the world of Emperor Fizzy forever. A curious old friend looks set to help. Dora had set up a hologram version of herself called 'HoloDora', whom she believes to be Dora's daughter and when the children are detected by 'HoloDora', she change to help them to bring back the dimension with the parents. Reese attempts to modify the magnetics of the Quantum Nexus in order to damage the machine due to her worries of connect the wrong dimensions. Reese fails to do this, as she does not know the two dimensions are connected. The wrong dimension is set to come to Earth, which results in the adults – now teenagers – arriving. Note: final appearance of Callum, Tia, Jeffery and Liam. Note: guest appearance of HoloDora and final appearance of Muna.

=== Series 3 (2015) ===
No.	Title	Written by	Original release date
1	"The Neuroscrambler"	Alison Hume	5 January 2015
After bringing the teenage versions of their parents to their dimension, the remaining Sparticles are locked up by the monstrous Queen Kylie. During a rescue mission, Reese teams up another sensitive named Aris, and they manage to send one of the teen parents home and escape with Holly's teen mother Kim. While heading to the resistance HQ, Reese created a plan to send Kylie home so the Sparticles head back to the Citadel to rescue Aris. Note: First Appearance of Aris, Kim, Queen Kylie, Dora, Erimon and Bryan.
2	"The Bounty Hunters"	Alison Hume	12 January 2015
Dora's Neuroscrambler machine goes wrong, causing Aris to lose his memory. Meanwhile, a resistance member Jenna snitches on the Sparticles via a Truthline and joins the bounty hunters Fizzy and Bryan. They kidnap Frankie while she's away from the others but Ernesto leads them to an abandoned factory, where the Sparticles manage to rescue Frankie and slow down the bounty hunters but also manage to get Ernesto fired from the resistance. Meanwhile, Dora helps Aris escape after wiping his memory and Kim discovers she is Holly's teen Mother. Note: First Appearance of Rat and Jenna.
3	"The Trading Post"	Dan Berlinka	19 January 2015
The Sparticles, on the run from the Bounty Hunters, stop in at a trading post only to find a layline and another sensitive named Orion like the constellation. Sadiq, Holly, Frankie and Kim are locked up while looking for the boy, Orion, but are soon rescued by Reese and Aris before the Bounty Hunters find them. Orion shows Reese and Aris a book which relates to their dreams and the laylines. After Serena gets Ernesto accidentally tied up and turned into a trap, the rest of the Sparticles are trapped but are rescued by Orion who sends Jenna home, taking Fizzy and Bryan's relationship down a notch. The Sparticles escape but leave Orion and his friend behind to be mind-wiped. Note: First Appearance of Orion and last appearance of Jenna. Note: Rat is absent in this episode.
4	"The Comet"	James Moran	26 January 2015
Reese uses her 'powers' and the help of Holodora to work out the secret to ridding the world of Queen Kylie and the Teen Parents. Reese finds out that the 'Red Dragon' comet is going to pass by in September and that it's made of luminite. Meanwhile, Ernesto and Serena are attempting to earn Rat's trust again by going through rather straining military exercises, Fizzy and Bryan make a breakthrough with finding the Sparticles and Dora finds out how to get Orion to connect with Reese. Note: First regular appearance of HoloDora (voice only.) Note: Guest appearance of Yarah
5	"The Teen Father"	Kieran Doherty	2 February 2015
Ernesto and Serena join forces with the resistance to infiltrate the Citadel and attempt to rescue Orion, but are actually on a rescue mission for the toys Kylie locked away. At the resistance HQ, the two meet Rat's child – which will eventually grow up to be Ernesto! Meanwhile, Kylie is impatient to learn the Sparticles plan, she has Dora trick Orian to connect to Reese and she accidentally tipping them off about the Resistance's plan and their own. Note: Final Appearance of Rat. Note: HoloDora is absent in this episode.
6	"The Wild Things"	Bronah Taggart and Alison Hume	9 February 2015
When Frankie's rabbit goes missing, the Sparticles find themselves locked up by a 'friend' of Kylie's named Lady Lucy-this"friend" has never actually visited or met Queen Kylie in real life. Frankie escapes and befriends her servant Robyn, who reveals that she is the real Lady Lucy and the imposter stole her identity. Serena and Ernesto arrive at the forest in time to rescue everyone and discover the real Lady Lucy is a sensitive. Meanwhile at the Citadel, Kylie wipes Orion's mind and discovers the Sparticle's plan. Orion explains the plan about the "special places" Reese spoke about to be several points called laylines across the country mirroring the Orion constellation where the sensitives are going to stand. Note: Fizzy, Bryan and HoloDora are absent in this episode Note: Guest appearance of Lucie and Robyn.
7	"The Zone"	Matt Sinclair	16 February 2015
The Sparticles head to a 'Quantum Anomaly' known as 'The Zone' to visit a sensitive with healing powers so he can make Holly recover from a mysterious illness. The sensitive, known as Jason, reveals that Holly is pregnant and in perfect health, much to Ernesto's shock and delight. Meanwhile the bounty hunters chase Reese and Aris into a Quantum Fracture where the two find themselves in the adult dimension, and manage to download HoloDora onto a tablet and return home to continue on with the mission. Note: Queen Kylie, Orion, Dora and Erimon are absent in this episode. Note: Guest Appearance of Jason and Holly's mother.
8	"The Fisher Girls"	Matt Sinclair	23 February 2015
Queen Boudicca's daughter wants to help the Sparticles fight against Queen Kylie but she urgently needs to return to her own dimension to fight the Romans. Serena, Reese and HoloDora send Bua home, to Sadiq's dismay, of losing their fifth sensitive, and to Aris' annoyance that Reese did not allow him to help send Bua home. Serena and Ernesto take Fizzy and Bryan's jeep (which the Fisher tribe stole the keys for) and part ways which they go to the citadel to rescue Orion, while Sadiq and the others search for the sixth sensitive. Note: Erimon is absent in this episode. Note: Guest Appearance of Bua. Note: Frankie gives her rabbit, Roger, to the Fisher Tribe making it his final appearance
9	"The Raid"	James Moran	2 March 2015
After watching Kylie play with Orion's mind, Erimon decides that he hates his sister and regrets helping her become Queen. Meanwhile Serena and Ernesto break Orion out of the citadel, helping him remember who the true Sparticles are with Reese's friendship bracelet. HoloDora also enters the Citadel and finds Dora, only to be shocked when she finds out that her teen mother is helping the evil Queen, and then accidentally mentioning the Red Dragon comet. Kylie uses this information and takes matters into her own hands by heading to the Circle of Perpetual Time with the after overhearing Dora and Erimon plotting against her. Serena, Ernesto and Orion successfully escape the Citadel, but with the knowledge that Kylie knows the full Sparticle plan. Note: Sadiq, Reese, Holly, Frankie, Aris and Kim are absent in this episode. This is the first episode in the entire series in which Sadiq, Reese and Frankie do not appear.
10	"The Haunting"	Matt Sinclair	9 March 2015
The Sparticles arrive at a 'haunted' house and find the next Sensitive, who doesn't know how to use his powers. However, when Aris disappears, the rest of the Sparticles vanish one by one. The source of the kidnappings is Queen Kylie, who reached the house first and is aware of a different sensitive who turns out to be the 'ghost' in the house. Reese and Yanx have the perfect opportunity to send Kylie home but are stopped by Aris, who believes he is saving his mother and leaves with her. The Sparticles leave the mansion with confirmation that Orion has been broken out of the citadel and that Kylie is planning to block the Sensonet at the Circle of Perpetual Time. Note: Serena, Ernesto, Orion, Dora, Erimon, Fizzy, Bryan and HoloDora are absent in this episode. Note: Guest Appearance of Yanx.
11	"The Troll Bridge"	Michael Shannon	16 March 2015
Kylie and The Sparticles are held up in their missions by a bridge guarded by apparently cannibal trolls. Sadiq and Serena break up in an argument and Kylie tests the Neuroscrambler on Sadiq when she works with the Troll Queen Trina and ties him up and wipes his memories of the day. Aris rejoins the Sparticles as a spy for Kylie. Note: Orion is absent in this episode.
12	"The Keeper"	Alison Hume	23 March 2015
The Sparticles arrive at a lighthouse and stay there while Holly gives birth, only to find the oldest man in the world still living there. Ernesto follows him to his garden, and discovers the Circle of Perpetual Time! Frankie, Reese and later Sadiq discover that Aris is a spy for Kylie, who is at the lighthouse setting up the Neuroscrambler. Dora and Erimon arrive with the transmitter, and Aris discovers Kylie has been lying to him and rejoins the Sparticles who believe The Keeper is the final sensitive. Kim reveals to Holly that she is her Teen Mum, but then issues arrive when The Keeper isn't the final sensitive. Note: Guest appearance of Lucie, Jason, Yanx and The Keeper.
13	"The Circle of Perpetual Time"	Alison Hume	30 March 2015
The comet approaches, and the Sparticles discover that Holly's newborn baby is the final sensitive. The Neuroscrambler breaks down, due to HoloDora's interference, Kylie orders Dora to repair it, and threatens to push Erimon off the cliff if she doesn't. Dora attempts to fix it but HoloDora messes with the Neuroscrambler's coding, leaving it stuck on mind-wipe mode, meaning the only way to save the sensitives is to turn it off. Dora still turns it on due to her feelings for Erimon. Aris explains Kylie's plan to burn out the minds of the Sensitives using the comet including the baby. Bryan thinks that the baby won't be affected too greatly as she doesn't know much, which infuriates Fizzy, who states that's why Bryan never made a good father in his future. Fizzy helps the Sparticles break into the lighthouse and disable the Neuroscrambler while Aris stays with the keeper, discovering that he dreams about the comet too. Kylie shuts Fizzy and the Sparticles outside, believing she is unable to trust anyone after Erimon's 'betrayal'. HoloDora shows Kylie, Erimon and Dora an image of Holly and Ernesto's daughter, and explain that if she goes ahead with her plan, she will fry her mind. Kylie remains ignorant, even with Ernesto's plead to spare her and the sensitives. Kim brings the baby to Reese and Aris, but the sensitives can't connect with her. Kylie attempts one final try at convincing Aris not to line up, but instead he heals her scar with Jason's powers. Aris figures out the keeper's riddles and learns that the herb garden isn't the circle of perpetual time, but the old man was. They quickly race to the lighthouse where the old man is. The Keeper's powers activate when he holds Holly's baby and the sensitive link up. The comet passes over, but nothing happens, because HoloDora steals the power and becomes real. Upon realizing what she really looked like, Dora convinces her to do the right thing and send the teen parents home. She releases the energy into a portal, which sends, Kylie, Erimon, Dora, Bryan, Kim, Orion and all the other teen parents back to their times. Holly is searching for the others when her mother emerges, and they embrace. Fizzy's dad and other adults appear as well. HoloDora had altered the quantum energy transfer to bring back their proper parents (possibly losing the old man in the process, who appeared as a hologram with HoloDora). Holly and Ernesto present Kim with her granddaughter (whom they named 'Kimmy', after her.). The Sparticles rejoice and celebrate the victory in bringing back their parents, bringing their quest to an end. The episode and show ends on a celebratory "We did it!" Note: Final appearance of Sadiq, Reese, Aris, Frankie, Holly, Ernesto, Serena, Kim, Kylie, Dora, Erimon, Fizzy, Bryan and HoloDora. Note: This is the final episode. Note: Guest appearance of Lucie, Jason, Yanx, The Keeper, Holly's Baby (Kimmy), Holly's Mother (Kim) and Fizzy's Dad (Bryan).
