= Robert Goodwill =

British Conservative politician

The Right Honourable Sir Robert Goodwill PC
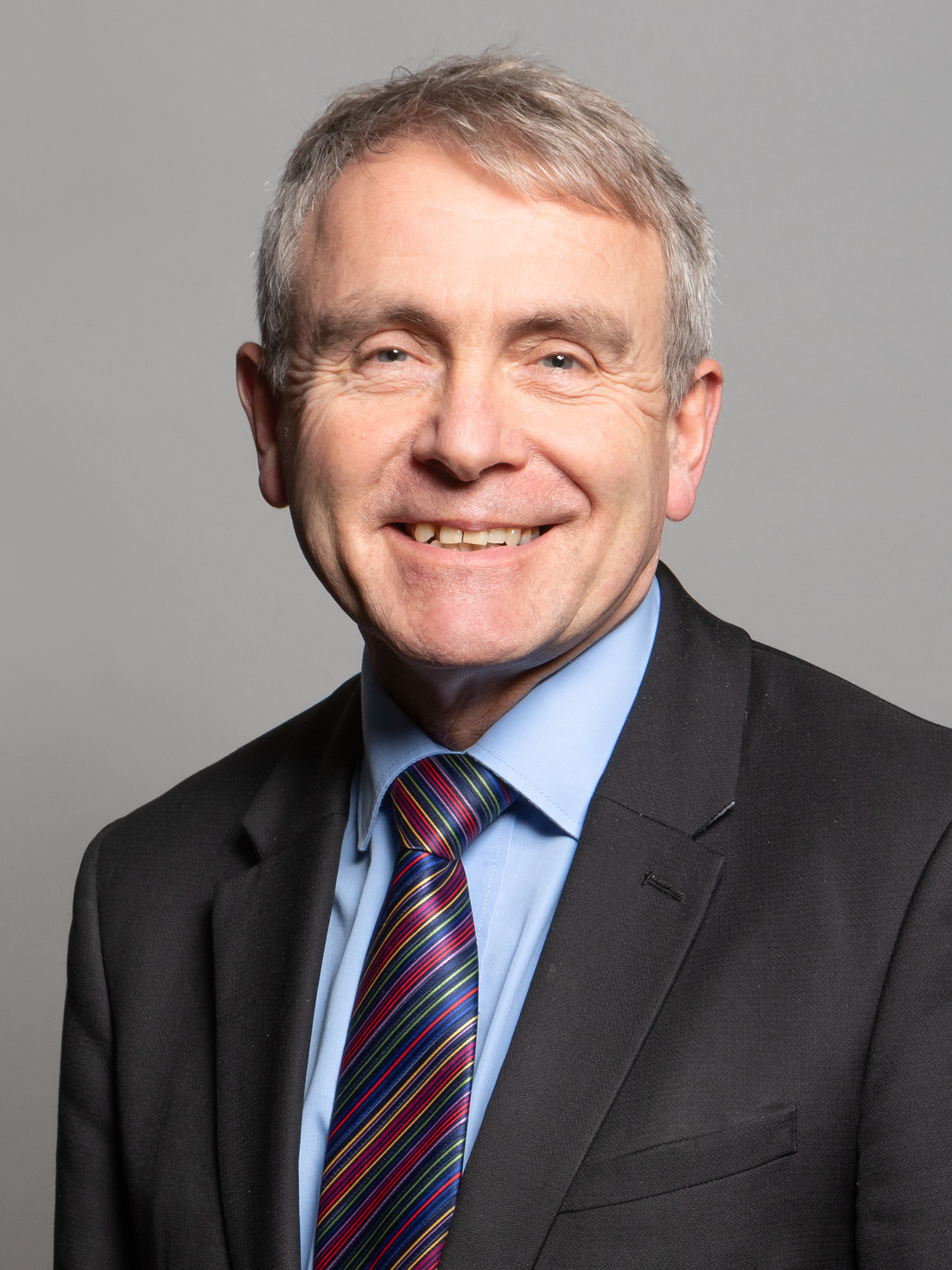
- Official Portrait, 2020

Chair of the Environment, Food and Rural Affairs Select Committee
- In office 25 May 2022 – 30 May 2024
- Preceded by: Geraint Davies (interim)
- Succeeded by: Alistair Carmichael

Minister of State for Agriculture, Fisheries & Food
- In office 5 March 2019 – 25 July 2019
- Prime Minister: Theresa May
- Preceded by: George Eustice
- Succeeded by: George Eustice

Minister of State for Children and Families
- In office 12 June 2017 – 9 January 2018
- Prime Minister: Theresa May
- Preceded by: Edward Timpson
- Succeeded by: Nadhim Zahawi

Minister of State for Immigration
- In office 16 July 2016 – 11 June 2017
- Prime Minister: Theresa May
- Preceded by: James Brokenshire
- Succeeded by: Brandon Lewis

Minister of State for Transport
- In office 9 December 2015 – 16 July 2016
- Prime Minister: David Cameron
- Preceded by: John Hayes
- Succeeded by: John Hayes

Parliamentary Under-Secretary of State for Transport
- In office 7 October 2013 – 9 December 2015
- Prime Minister: David Cameron
- Preceded by: Norman Baker
- Succeeded by: The Lord Ahmad of Wimbledon

Lord Commissioner of the Treasury
- In office 4 September 2012 – 7 October 2013
- Prime Minister: David Cameron
- Preceded by: James Duddridge
- Succeeded by: Karen Bradley

Member of Parliament for Scarborough and Whitby
- In office 5 May 2005 – 30 May 2024
- Preceded by: Lawrie Quinn
- Succeeded by: Alison Hume

Member of the European Parliament for Yorkshire and the Humber
- In office 15 July 1999 – 1 May 2004
- Preceded by: Position established
- Succeeded by: Godfrey Bloom

Personal details
- Born: 31 December 1956 (age 69) Terrington, England
- Party: Conservative
- Spouse: Maureen Short
- Children: 3
- Education: Newcastle University
- Website: Official website

Sir Robert Goodwill, PC (born 31 December 1956) is a British Conservative Party politician and farmer who served as a Member of Parliament (MP) for Scarborough and Whitby from 2005 to 2024. He was previously a Member of the European Parliament (MEP) for Yorkshire and the Humber. Goodwill served in Theresa May's government as Minister of State at the Home Office, the Department for Education, and the Department for Environment, Food and Rural Affairs.

Goodwill is a member of the Cornerstone Group of Conservative MPs. He describes himself as a "staunch Eurosceptic" but supported Remain in the EU referendum.

== Early life ==
Goodwill was born in Terrington, North Riding of Yorkshire, and was privately educated at the Quaker Bootham School in York and the University of Newcastle upon Tyne where he received a Bachelor of Science degree in agriculture in 1979.

He has been the managing director of Mowthorpe (UK) Ltd. since 1995, which offers environmentally friendly burials in the North Yorkshire countryside.

== Political career ==
Goodwill is a member of the Conservative Party and contested his first constituency, Redcar, at the 1992 general election, where he finished second, 11,577 votes behind the sitting Labour MP, Mo Mowlam. He unsuccessfully contested Cleveland and Richmond in the 1994 European election. He again attempted to enter the House of Commons at the 1997 general election when he was selected for the marginally held Conservative seat of North West Leicestershire following the deselection of the sitting MP David Ashby. Goodwill was defeated by Labour's David Taylor by 13,219 votes. In 1998, he contested the Yorkshire South European Parliament by-election, but was again defeated.

He was elected as a Member of the European Parliament at the 1999 European Parliament election for the Yorkshire and the Humber region, serving in Brussels and Strasbourg until the 2004 European Parliament election. He was deputy leader of the Conservative MEPs during his term, and also opposed the Conservative Party's membership of the European People's Party in the European Parliament.

From 1999 to 2004, he was a member of the Committee on the Environment, Public Health, and Consumer Policy, and from 2001 to 2004 was a member of the Committee on Women's Rights and Equal Opportunities.

In September 2001, he participated in the European Parliament Observer Mission on the Presidential Election in Belarus. In 2003, Goodwill criticised the Council of the European Union's proposal to ban smoky bacon flavoured crisps, calling it "over the top" and "disproportionate to the possible risks." During the 2004 European Parliament election campaign, The Guardian classed Goodwill as "pro-war" as a result of his supporting a motion in the European Parliament that said the Iraq War was inevitable and the result of Saddam Hussein's actions.

In the 2005 general election, Goodwill stood in the constituency of Scarborough and Whitby, winning the seat from Labour incumbent Lawrie Quinn by 1,245 votes. He made his maiden speech on 6 June 2005.

In August 2005, Goodwill co-authored a letter to The Spectator with five other newly elected Conservative MPs, criticising the "decadent" nature of British society. In the 2005 Conservative Party leadership election, Goodwill supported Liam Fox's candidacy, declaring his support on 14 October 2005.

After spending 18 months as a member of the Transport Select Committee, he was appointed an Opposition Whip by David Cameron in 2006 and promoted to the post of Shadow Roads Minister in the Transport team in 2007. He was re-elected with an increased majority of 8,130 at the 2010 general election and appointed to the government as a Whip with responsibility for Treasury and DEFRA business. Goodwill is secretary of the All Party Parliamentary Flag Group.

In the October 2013 ministerial reshuffle, he became Parliamentary Under-Secretary of State for Transport, replacing Norman Baker. Goodwill was given responsibility for aviation policy Goodwill had previously established himself as a strong opponent of a third runway at Heathrow, inviting Greenpeace members to plant a tree in his constituency as a gesture of "solidarity" with opponents of Heathrow expansion. Goodwill was re-appointed to his position as Parliamentary Under-Secretary of State for Transport following the 2015 general election and the election of a Conservative majority government. He was the minister responsible for cycling, aviation, road safety, walking and High Speed 2. He was promoted to Minister of State at the Department of Transport in December 2015.

In January 2016, the Labour Party unsuccessfully proposed an amendment in Parliament that would have required private landlords to make their homes "fit for human habitation.". According to Parliament's register of interests, Goodwill was one of 72 Conservative MPs who voted against the amendment who personally derived an income from renting out property. The Conservative Government had responded to the amendment that they believed homes should be fit for human habitation but did not want to pass the new law that would explicitly require it.

In the 2016 European Union membership referendum, in which the UK voted to 'Leave' the EU by 52% to 48%, Goodwill supported a 'Remain' vote despite stating on his own website he was a "staunch Eurosceptic".

In the Conservative Party leadership election following David Cameron's resignation as Prime Minister, Goodwill supported Liam Fox's candidacy, acting as his proposer (Fox was eliminated in the first round of voting). The eventual winner, Theresa May, moved Goodwill to the Home Office, where he assumed the role of Minister of State for Immigration. In the cabinet reshuffle following the 2017 general election, Goodwill was appointed as education minister (Goodwill was succeeded by policing Minister Brandon Lewis).

Goodwill was dismissed from the post of Children's Minister on 9 January 2018.

Goodwill joined the Environmental Audit Select Committee on 22 January 2018 and the Northern Ireland Affairs Select Committee on 5 March 2018. He remained on these two committees until he rejoined the government in March 2019, when he became Minister of State for Agriculture, Fisheries, & Food, replacing George Eustice who had resigned over Brexit.

In the 2019 Conservative Party leadership election, Goodwill supported Jeremy Hunt's candidacy. On 25 July 2019, he was dismissed from his role as Minister of State for Agriculture, Fisheries & Food by newly elected Prime Minister Boris Johnson and replaced by George Eustice.

In the 2019 general election, Goodwill was reelected with a majority of 10,270.

In 2021, he considered challenging Graham Brady for the chairmanship of the 1922 Committee but eventually withdrew from the race, backing the only opposing candidate Heather Wheeler.

In May 2022, Goodwill was elected as chairman of the Environment, Food, and Rural Affairs Select Committee. He is a member of Conservative Friends of the Countryside, a right-wing group that advocates for the use of neonicotinoid pesticides (which have been banned in the EU as they are lethal to bees), opposes the re-introduction of wild beavers to the UK, supports the burning of peatland (which can have adverse environmental effects) and opposes a ban on imports of endangered animals killed for trophy hunting.

He announced in April 2023 that he would retire at the 2024 general election.

He left a permanent mark on England's roads in the form of the yellow plate for motor caravan parking restrictions. As MP for Scarborough and Whitby, he asked the Department for Transport to do something to make such restrictions enforceable. The sign was included in special authorisations issued to all local authorities in 2012; these remain the legal basis for the sign.

In 2025, Goodwill stood as a Conservative Party candidate for the Weaponess & Ramshill ward of the newly-formed Scarborough Town Council, but was unsuccessful, coming sixth in a field of eight candidates, ahead only of two other Conservative candidates.

== Expenses ==
In 2000, whilst working as a Conservative MEP, Goodwill highlighted the generous allowances given to MEPs when he stated that he bought return air tickets from Bradford to Brussels for £160 and claimed, legally, £500. The Conservative Party criticised his actions. Goodwill later donated £2,000 to local charities following feedback from constituents.

In 2013, following on from a review of capital gains made by MPs from their tax-payer funded second homes, the Independent Parliamentary Standards Authority ordered Goodwill to repay £4,963.39.

== Personal life ==
He married Maureen Short in November 1987 in North Yorkshire, and they have two sons (born May 1989 and June 1991) and a daughter (born May 1994). He employs his wife as a part-time caseworker on a salary just under £30,000.

He was once the chairman of the cereals and livestock committee of the North Yorkshire National Farmers Union (1986–1988). He takes a keen interest in steam engines and owns several; he once brought an engine back from the former Czechoslovakia to restore it. He stepped in to save the Scarborough Pleasure Ship, Coronia, in January 2011 so that the historic Dunkirk-veteran vessel can continue to be based in the harbour there.

Goodwill also owns a 1900 De Dion Bouton Veteran Car that he races on the London to Brighton Veteran Car Run.

== Honours ==
=== Commonwealth honours ===
Commonwealth honours

| Location | Date | Appointment | Post-nominal letters |
|---|---|---|---|
| United Kingdom | 24 April 2018 – Present | Member of Her Majesty's Most Honourable Privy Council | PC |
| United Kingdom | 31 December 2021 – Present | Knight Bachelor | Kt: 2022 New Years Honours List; "For Political and Public service" |

Parliament of the United Kingdom
| Preceded by Lawrie Quinn | Member of Parliament for Scarborough and Whitby; 2005–2024 | Succeeded by Alison Hume |
Political offices
| Preceded by John Hayes | Minister of State for Transport; 2015–2016 | Succeeded by John Hayes |
| Preceded by James Brokenshire | Minister of State for Immigration; 2016–2017 | Succeeded by Brandon Lewis |
