= 1931 Scarborough and Whitby by-election =

1931 UK parliamentary by-election

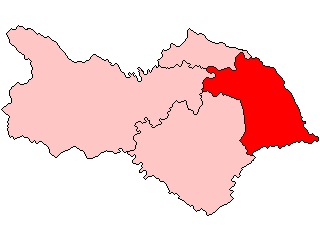
North Yorkshire containing the Scarborough & Whitby seat 1918-1974

The 1931 Scarborough and Whitby by-election was a parliamentary by-election for the British House of Commons constituency of Scarborough and Whitby on 6 May 1931.

== Vacancy ==
The by-election was caused by the resignation of the sitting Conservative MP, Sidney Herbert on 20 April 1931. He had been MP here since winning the seat in 1922.

== Election history ==
The constituency had always returned Unionists since its creation in 1918. However, the Liberals had come close to winning in 1923. The result at the last General election was also close;

1929 general election: Scarborough and Whitby
Party	Candidate	Votes	%	±%
Unionist	Sidney Herbert	20,710	48.3	−9.2
Liberal	Henry Paterson Gisborne	17,544	40.9	+6.7
Labour	H D Rowntree	4,645	10.8	+2.5
Majority		3,166	7.4	−15.9
Turnout		42,899	79.7	+0.8
Unionist hold		Swing	-8.0	

== Candidates ==
The local Conservative Association chose 26-year-old Sir Paul Latham as their candidate to defend the seat. He had recently inherited the Latham baronetcy. Latham was a member of the London County Council, representing Lewisham East as a member of the Conservative-backed Municipal Reform Party. At the 1929 general election, he stood as the Conservative candidate in Rotherham, a safe seat for the Labour Party where he was runner-up with 23% of the votes.

The local Liberals put forward 59-year-old Ramsay Muir as their candidate. He was central to Liberal party policy development in the 1920s. Muir was elected at the 1923 general election as Member of Parliament (MP) for Rochdale in Lancashire, having been unsuccessful in that constituency at the 1922 general election However he was defeated at the 1924 election. He stood for Parliament again without success in the 1926 by-election for the Combined English Universities and at the 1929 general election again at Rochdale.

It was apparent from the beginning that there existed a division in the Scarborough Labour Party as to the advisability of putting forward a Candidate. Nevertheless, attempts were made to secure a nomination but without success. A resolution was therefore carried not to enter the contest, which, upon being reported to the National Executive Committee, was endorsed. However, following pressure from the ILP, the local party adopted a Mr Williams as candidate and on 24 April 1931 sought his endorsement by the NEC. However, the NEC refused to endorse him for the following reasons; (a) The first decision of the Divisional Party not to contest, which the Committee had endorsed. (b) The division in the local ranks, which would have prevented an active campaign. (c) A shortage of financial resources. (d) The time factor, as the writ had been issued. The Scarborough Divisional Labour Party loyally abided by the decision of the Executive Committee and did not put forward a Candidate.

== Campaign ==
Polling day was set for 6 May 1931, just 16 days after the resignation of the previous member.

Lloyd George came to speak for Ramsay Muir twice, once in a hall and once in the Excursion Station and attracted large and enthusiastic audiences.

== Result ==
Latham held the seat. There was a small swing to the Liberals;

Scarborough and Whitby by-election, 1931 Electorate 55,546
Party	Candidate	Votes	%	±%
Conservative	Paul Latham	21,618	52.7	+4.4
Liberal	Ramsay Muir	19,429	47.3	+6.4
Majority		2,189	5.4	−2.0
Turnout		41,047	75.5	−4.2
Conservative hold		Swing	-1.0	

== Aftermath ==
Latham held the seat at the 1931 general election. Muir however, contested Louth without success. This left the Liberals without a candidate. Muir returned to contest the 1935 general election to Scarborough and Whitby. The result at the following General election;

General election 1931: Scarborough & Whitby Electorate 55,546
Party	Candidate	Votes	%	±%
Conservative	Paul Latham	32,025	82.97	
Labour	P S Eastman	6,575	17.03	
Majority		25,450	65.93	
Turnout		38,600	69.49	
Conservative hold		Swing		

Latham's parliamentary career continued until 1941, when he was arrested for "improper behaviour", a homosexual act, with three gunners and a civilian while serving as an officer in the Royal Artillery.

== See also ==
- List of United Kingdom by-elections
- United Kingdom by-election records
