= Alexander Spearman =

British politician (1901–1982)

Sir Alexander Spearman
- Spearman in 1960

Member of Parliament for Scarborough and Whitby
- In office 1941–1966
- Preceded by: Sir Paul Latham
- Succeeded by: Michael Shaw

Personal details
- Born: 2 March 1901
- Died: 5 April 1982 (aged 81)
- Party: Conservative
- Spouse(s): Diana (Doyle) Spearman (m. 1928; div. 1951) Diana Josephine Lambert (Ward) Spearman (m. 1951)
- Children: 5
- Education: Repton School; Hertford College, Oxford
- Military career
- Allegiance: United Kingdom
- Branch: Royal Navy

Sir Alexander Cadwallader Mainwaring Spearman (2 March 1901 – 5 April 1982) was a British Conservative member of parliament (MP).

His father, who was a Commander in the Royal Navy and commanded a battalion of a Royal Naval Brigade in the First World War, was killed in action in the Dardanelles Campaign.

Alexander was educated at Repton and Hertford College, Oxford, where he was in receipt of a scholarship for descendants of Sir Francis Baring. After Oxford, he became a stockbroker, and in 1941, he was elected to Parliament as a Conservative in a by-election for the seat of Scarborough and Whitby. He had earlier failed to be elected at Gorton and Mansfield. He held his seat in every election until 1966 when he retired.

In 1951 to 1952, he was Parliamentary Private Secretary to the President of the Board of Trade. In 1956, he was knighted. A former governor of the London School of Economics, he spoke frequently in the House of Commons on financial and economic issues.

He was married twice and had five children. He married Diana, his first wife, in 1928; they were divorced in 1951, in which year he married his second wife, also called Diana. His first wife contested Poplar South in the 1935 general election, failing to be elected in what was a safe Labour seat. She contested Kingston upon Hull Central in the 1945 general election, again failing to be elected.

His grandson Alexander James Spearman (born 1984) married in 2014 Dona Amelia de Orléans e Bragança, daughter of Dom Antônio de Orléans e Bragança, a descendant of the former Brazilian imperial family, and his wife Princess Christine de Ligne, a member of the Belgian aristocracy.

== See also ==
- Spearman Baronets

Parliament of the United Kingdom
Preceded by Sir Paul Latham	Member of Parliament for Scarborough and Whitby; 1941–1966	Succeeded by Michael Shaw
