= 1941 Scarborough and Whitby by-election =

1941 UK parliamentary by-election

The 1941 Scarborough and Whitby by-election was held on 24 September 1941. The by-election was caused by the resignation of the incumbent Conservative MP, Paul Latham, who had been charged with indecency. The Conservative candidate was Alexander Spearman, who had formerly contested Mansfield and Gorton unsuccessfully. In keeping with wartime practice, the by-election was not contested by the other parties in the coalition government, but Spearman was opposed by W. R. Hipwell, the editor of the tabloid newspaper Reveille, running as an 'independent Democrat'. Spearman won with 12,518 votes; Hipwell received 8,086. Thirty-six per cent of the electorate cast their votes. Hipwell's campaign focused on complaints about the conditions of Services personnel. He ran again as an Independent Progressive in by-elections in Hampstead, Salisbury and The Hartlepools.

Scarborough and Whitby by-election, 1941
Party	Candidate	Votes	%	±%
Conservative	Alexander Spearman	12,518	60.8	+6.9
Independent Progressive	William Reginald Hipwell	8,086	39.2	N/A
Majority		4,432	21.6	+6.4
Turnout		20,604	35.9	−38.8
Conservative hold		Swing		
