= Grace Mandeville =

British actress

- Born: 28 November 1994 (age 31)
- Occupations: Actress; model; vlogger; Television presenter
- Years active: 2010–present
- Relatives: Amelia Mandeville (sister)

Grace Mandeville (born 28 November 1994) is a British actress, vlogger, model, television presenter, and internet personality best known for portraying Holly on CBBC's The Sparticle Mystery and for her and her sister's YouTube channel, "Mandeville Sisters."

== Early life and education ==
Grace Mandeville is from Surrey and was born with a foreshortened right arm. She has a younger sister, Amelia, whom she shares her YouTube channel with, and a younger brother. Mandeville attended sixth form in Surrey while filming The Sparticle Mystery. Mandeville chose to pursue acting instead of attend university.

== Career ==
=== Acting ===
Mandeville began seriously acting when she was fifteen, getting mostly advertorial jobs. Prior to this she appeared as an extra in Harry Potter and the Order of the Phoenix as a Hogwarts student. In 2010, she was cast as Holly in the CBBC show, The Sparticle Mystery, which premiered in February 2011. Mandeville also appeared in BBC3's The Fear alongside her younger sister, Amelia. She has also appeared in advertisements for Huawei and Matalan and is frequently in CBBC shorts such as Lifebabble and Whoops I Missed the Bus with her sister. In 2016, Mandeville also appeared as a panelist in the CBBC show, The Dog Ate My Homework.

In 2016, Mandeville and her sister began presenting for MTV UK.

=== Mandeville Sisters ===
Mandeville and her younger sister Amelia created a YouTube channel in December 2013 called the "Mandeville Sisters". The channel has amassed over 114,000 subscribers. The sisters film weekly vlogs called the "MandevWeekly," and additionally post one other video during the week. They have filmed a number of videos surrounding disabilities and everyday life with one hand. The channel also includes collaborations and interviews with celebrities and other YouTubers.

=== Modeling ===
Mandeville models prosthetics for Open Bionics. In 2015, she modeled a Star Wars themed prosthetic arm for Fashion Finds the Force, designed by Open Bionics. She also modeled a prosthetic arm for Sophie de Oliveira Barata's "Alternative Limb Project" from which Mandeville was featured in the New York Times. Mandeville has also modeled for Dazed magazine and TenEighty magazine.

== Personal life ==
Mandeville lives with her family in Somerset. She began dating Ryan Anthony, a cyber security engineer, in May 2016, and the couple married in August 2019. In January 2022, Mandeville announced that the couple were expecting a baby boy later that year. Her son was born in 2022. In November 2024, Mandeville announced in a YouTube video that she and Anthony were expecting a baby girl in 2025. Her daughter was born in 2025.

== Filmography ==
Film/Television roles
Year	Title	Role	Notes
2007	Harry Potter and the Order of the Phoenix	Unnamed Hogwarts Student	
2011–2015	The Sparticle Mystery	Holly	Seasons 1-3
2015	The Fear	Herself	6 Episodes
2016	The Dog Ate My Homework	Herself-Panelist	Season 3, 2 episodes
