= Paul Latham =

British Conservative Party politician (1905-1955)

Major Sir Herbert Paul Latham 2nd Baronet
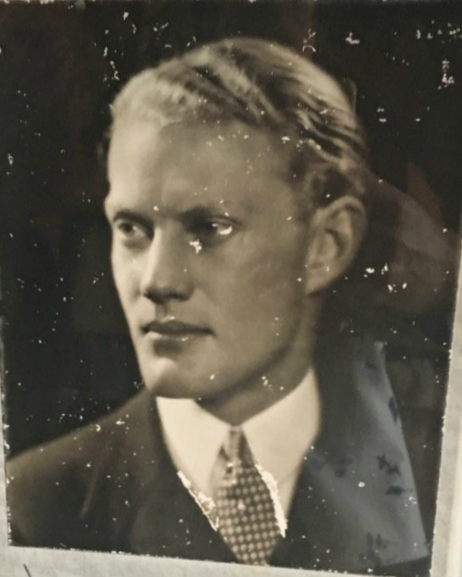
- Paul Latham in the 1930s

Member of Parliament for Scarborough and Whitby
- In office 6 May 1931 – 18 August 1941
- Preceded by: Sidney Herbert
- Succeeded by: Alexander Spearman

Personal details
- Born: 22 April 1905
- Died: 24 July 1955 (aged 50)
- Party: Conservative
- Spouse: Lady Patricia Doreen Moore (1933–1943)
- Education: Magdalen College, Oxford

Major Sir Herbert Paul Latham, 2nd Baronet (22 April 1905 – 24 July 1955) was a British Conservative Party politician who served as Member of Parliament (MP) for Scarborough and Whitby constituency from 1931 to 1941.

== Biography ==
The son of Sir Thomas Paul Latham and his wife Florence Clara née Walley, he was educated at Eton College and Magdalen College, Oxford.

Between 1928 and 1934 Latham was a member of the London County Council, representing Lewisham East as a member of the Conservative-backed Municipal Reform Party.

At the 1929 general election, he stood as the Conservative candidate in Rotherham, a safe seat for the Labour Party where he was runner-up with 23% of the votes.

In April 1931 the standing MP for Scarborough and Whitby, Sidney Herbert, resigned from the House of Commons. Latham was selected as the Conservative candidate for the resulting by-election on 6 May, which he won with a majority of 5% of the votes over his Liberal Party opponent.

In 1932 Latham purchased Herstmonceux Castle in Sussex and carried on its restoration.

== Arrest, attempted suicide and court-martial ==
During World War II, despite being exempt from military service, Latham volunteered to join the army. In 1941, however, he was arrested for "improper behaviour", a homosexual act, with three gunners and a civilian (letters he had written to those involved had been discovered) while serving as an officer in the Royal Artillery. On 31 July 1941, the Secretary of State for War, David Margesson, formally informed the House of Commons that Latham had been placed under arrest in order to be tried by court-martial for alleged offences against military law.

Following the discovery of the correspondence, Latham attempted suicide by riding a motorcycle into a tree. Contemporary evidence discussed at his later court-martial noted that Latham had an artificial leg and that, although he had previously ridden the motorcycle involved, his disability could have affected his ability to operate its foot brake. The attempted suicide was subsequently included among the charges considered by the court-martial.

Latham's court-martial opened in September 1941. Contemporary reports differ over the precise number of charges. The New York Times reported on 5 September that the proceedings had begun with thirteen charges, including allegations of improper conduct involving three gunners and a civilian and a charge of attempted suicide. The following day, the newspaper reported that Latham had been acquitted of three of fourteen charges. A history of the Royal Observatory, Greenwich at Herstmonceux similarly states that he was found guilty on eleven of fourteen charges. Contemporary newspaper reporting quoted his defence counsel as telling the court that, irrespective of its decision, Latham's life was "now pretty well damned". He was discharged dishonourably and imprisoned for two years without hard labour. Latham's court-martial was the first time a sitting MP who was also in the army had been court-martialled since Lieutenant-General Sir John Murray in 1815.

Before the proceedings had been concluded, Latham vacated his parliamentary seat. On 18 August 1941 he accepted appointment as Steward and Bailiff of the Manor of Northstead, the constitutional mechanism by which a member of the House of Commons could resign his seat. The resulting Scarborough and Whitby by-election was held on 24 September 1941.

The surviving official court-martial file, held by The National Archives as WO 71/1062 under the description Latham, H.P. Offence: Indecency, contains records of the proceedings. A 2017 decision of the Information Commissioner's Office concerning access to the file records that substantial material specifically relating to Latham had been released, while information concerning surviving third parties remained withheld.

He served his sentence in Maidstone Prison. After his release in 1943 Latham commented to his fellow MP Henry Channon that he had found conditions and treatment at Maidstone Gaol better than at Eton.

== Later Life and death ==
Henry “Chips” Channon visited Latham at Herstmonceux in 13 September 1943. Latham was no longer living in the Castle, but alone in a tiny one-room cottage called “The Kennels” on the estate. Channon found him thinner and visibly aged. The room still contained fine books and pieces of good silver. They walked through the gardens and looked towards Herstmonceux Castle, which was then occupied by the Hearts of Oak Society. Channon recorded that Latham remained deeply attached to Herstmonceux Castle and was distressed by the prospect of never living there again. He described Latham as socially isolated following his conviction and was critical of both Latham's estranged wife, whom he blamed for abandoning him, and of Latham himself, whom he considered self-centred. Towards the end of the visit, however, he noted that Latham became emotional while showing photographs of his son, whom, according to Channon, he adored but did not see.

=== Sale of Herstmonceux Castle ===
In February 1944, the Admiralty approved in principle the relocation of the Royal Observatory from Greenwich to a new site. More than 70 possible locations were considered. The National Trust drew the Admiralty's attention to Herstmonceux Castle, reporting that Latham was "not a willing seller", although the prospect of the castle becoming the new home of the Royal Observatory appealed to him. By 21 March 1944, Herstmonceux had been included on a shortlist of five potential sites.

In April 1945, a committee of the Observatory's Board of Visitors inspected the five shortlisted properties. The committee subsequently recommended Herstmonceux, with Amport House as its second choice, and the Board of Visitors endorsed this recommendation in June 1945.

Negotiations concerning the acquisition continued during 1945. On 27 September, Harold Spencer Jones, the Astronomer Royal, informed the Hydrographer of the Navy that Latham was anxious for a decision because rates of approximately £3,000 on the property were due on 1 October. The terms of the acquisition remained unresolved into 1946, in part because Latham requested that the shooting rights over the estate be leased back to him.

In April 1946, the Admiralty announced its intention to acquire Herstmonceux Castle as the new home of the Royal Observatory.

According to George Wilkins's history of the Royal Greenwich Observatory, the purchase, for £76,000, was concluded in October 1946 after the precise boundaries of the estate had been established. The formal acquisition by the Admiralty took place on 18 February 1947. It comprised Herstmonceux Castle and an estate of 368 acres. Of the total £76,000 consideration, £70,000 was paid for the castle and estate and a further £6,000 for a temporary building erected on the grounds during the war by the Hearts of Oak Friendly Society, which Latham had subsequently purchased from the society.

The agreed purchase price exceeded an independent valuation of £67,000 which, according to the history of the Royal Observatory, would have formed the basis of the valuation had the property been acquired by compulsory purchase.

==== After castle sale and death ====
Surviving records of Latham's later life include correspondence with the writer and music critic Edward Sackville-West. The British Library's Edward Sackville-West Papers preserve correspondence between the two men dating from 1952 to approximately 1955, contained in Add MS 68905, ff. 132, 144–147v and 151.

In 1955, Latham became involved in the establishment of a Cheshire Home at Ampthill Park in Bedfordshire. Park House at Ampthill became a Cheshire Home that year, after Leonard Cheshire had visited the property in January 1955.

According to an account subsequently published by the Cheshire Homes, Latham had written to the organisation offering his assistance at a time when it had nobody available to establish the Ampthill home. Cheshire asked him to help set it up, and Latham subsequently recruited local supporters, including the woman who became chairman of its local committee. The same account states that Latham also contributed his own money when the project had insufficient funds.

His involvement was not limited to fundraising or organisation. An account by volunteers who travelled to Ampthill records that Latham personally met them on their arrival, drove them and their equipment to the house and showed them the rooms in which work was to begin. A later history in the same magazine described Latham as the "pioneer" of the Ampthill home and recalled the difficult conditions under which it had been established.

Lord Longford, who had known Latham personally, later recalled visiting him at Ampthill during this period. Writing in 1963, Longford stated that the home would not have been established without Latham and remembered finding him living there in conditions of considerable hardship and cold. Despite his circumstances, Longford recalled that Latham appeared happy and said that he was "happier than ever before". Longford further wrote that Latham subsequently developed cancer of the throat, from which he died soon afterwards. Cheshire's own account similarly states that Latham was diagnosed with cancer not long after beginning his work at Ampthill and that the illness eventually caused his death.

Latham died on 24 July 1955, aged 50. He was succeeded in the baronetcy by his son, Richard Thomas Paul Latham.

By the time of his death, Latham maintained residences at 4 Hyde Park Gardens Mews in Paddington, London, and at Herstmonceux Cottage in Herstmonceux, Sussex. A statutory notice concerning his estate published in The London Gazette described him as a "Baronet, Farmer", indicating that he had continued to maintain a connection with Herstmonceux after the sale of the Castle estate.

== Sexuality ==
Latham had a long-standing relationship with the writer and music critic Edward Sackville-West. According to biographer Michael Bloch, their relationship began in the mid-1920s and was sadomasochistic in character. A photograph of Latham inscribed "to Eddy from Paul" survives among objects associated with Sackville-West's rooms at Knole. Their association continued, or was later renewed: the British Library preserves correspondence between Latham and Sackville-West dating from 1952 to approximately 1955.

Latham also participated in London's wartime homosexual social scene. Gilbert Bradley, then a young BBC studio assistant and a regular at the Lower Bar of the Ritz Hotel, later recalled that Latham had picked him up there. The Lower Bar was known during the war as a meeting place for gay men. Bradley subsequently remembered buying The Times when Latham's court-martial was reported in 1941 and being surprised to learn from the proceedings that Latham had an artificial leg.

In 1932, Latham also became acquainted with Jack Hewit, who later lived for many years with Guy Burgess. In a 1994 interview, Hewit recalled that Latham collected him in a Rolls-Royce and invited him to spend a weekend at his country residence. Hewit stated that he was under sixteen at the time and later remarked on the considerable legal and reputational risk Latham had taken.

== Family ==
In 1933 Latham married Lady Patricia Doreen Moore, the daughter of Henry Moore, 10th Earl of Drogheda and Kathleen Pelham Burn. Historian Steven Bednarski has characterises the marriage as one of convenience, intended in part to provide Latham with the appearance of a conventional family life and an heir.

Lady Patricia divorced Latham in 1943 and died in 1947. He was succeeded in the baronetcy by their only son, Richard Thomas Paul Latham, born in April 1934.

Parliament of the United Kingdom
Preceded by Sidney Herbert	Member of Parliament for Scarborough and Whitby; 1931 – 1941	Succeeded by Alexander Spearman
Baronetage of the United Kingdom
Preceded by Thomas Paul Latham	Baronet (of Crow Clump); 1931–1955	Succeeded by Richard Thomas Paul Latham
