= Lawrie Quinn =

British politician (born 1956)

Member of Parliament for Scarborough and Whitby
- In office 1 May 1997 – 11 April 2005
- Preceded by: Constituency established
- Succeeded by: Robert Goodwill

Personal details
- Born: 25 December 1956 (age 69) Carlisle, Cumberland
- Party: Labour
- Spouse: Ann Christine Eames
- Education: University of Hertfordshire

Lawrence William Quinn (born 25 December 1956) is a British Labour Party politician and railway engineer. From 1997 to 2005 he served as the Member of Parliament for Scarborough and Whitby.

== Early life and education ==
Quinn was born in Harraby, a suburb of Carlisle, then in Cumberland. He attended Pennine Way Primary School and North Cumbria Technology College (then known as Harraby Comprehensive School) Harraby Comprehensive School. In 1979, at Hatfield Polytechnic, he gained a BSc in civil engineering.

Prior to his election to Parliament, he was a civil engineer with British Rail (1979–94) and Railtrack London North-East (1994–7), and a member of North Yorkshire County Council from 1989 to 1993.

== Parliamentary career ==
From 1989 to 1993, Quinn was a councillor on North Yorkshire County Council, serving on the Highways Committee, the Policy and Resources Committee and the Planning Committee.

He was elected to Parliament in the 1997 general election as Member of Parliament (MP) for Scarborough and Whitby, as part of the Labour landslide election victory. While he was not expecting to win the normally safe Conservative seat, he still retained it at the following general election in 2001. He served for two terms until being defeated by Conservative candidate Robert Goodwill in the 2005 general election. Quinn lost the seat by 1,245 votes.

Since losing his seat, Quinn has returned to engineering, working as Tube Lines New Works Delivery Manager on secondment from Bechtel (2005 until 2007) then as the Rail Projects Delivery Manager for Bechtel based in London. He is a member of the Fabian Society.

== Personal life ==
He married Ann Christine Eames in 1982.

Parliament of the United Kingdom
New constituency	Member of Parliament for Scarborough and Whitby; 1997–2005	Succeeded by Robert Goodwill
