= Scarborough and Whitby =

UK Parliament constituency (since 1997)

Coordinates: 54.38°N 0.54°W

- County constituency for the House of Commons
- Boundaries since 2010
- Boundary of Scarborough and Whitby in Yorkshire and the Humber
- County: North Yorkshire
- Electorate: 72,191 (December 2019)
- Major settlements: Scarborough and Whitby

Current constituency
- Created: 1997
- Member of Parliament: Alison Hume (Labour)
- Seats: One
- Created from: Scarborough

1918–1974
- Seats: One
- Type of constituency: County constituency
- Created from: Scarborough and Whitby
- Replaced by: Scarborough

Scarborough and Whitby is a constituency (Note: A county constituency (for the purposes of election expenses and type of returning officer).) in North Yorkshire represented in the House of Commons of the UK Parliament since 2024 by Alison Hume, a Labour MP. (Note: As with all constituencies, the constituency elects one Member of Parliament (MP) by the first past the post system of election at least every five years.)

== Constituency profile ==
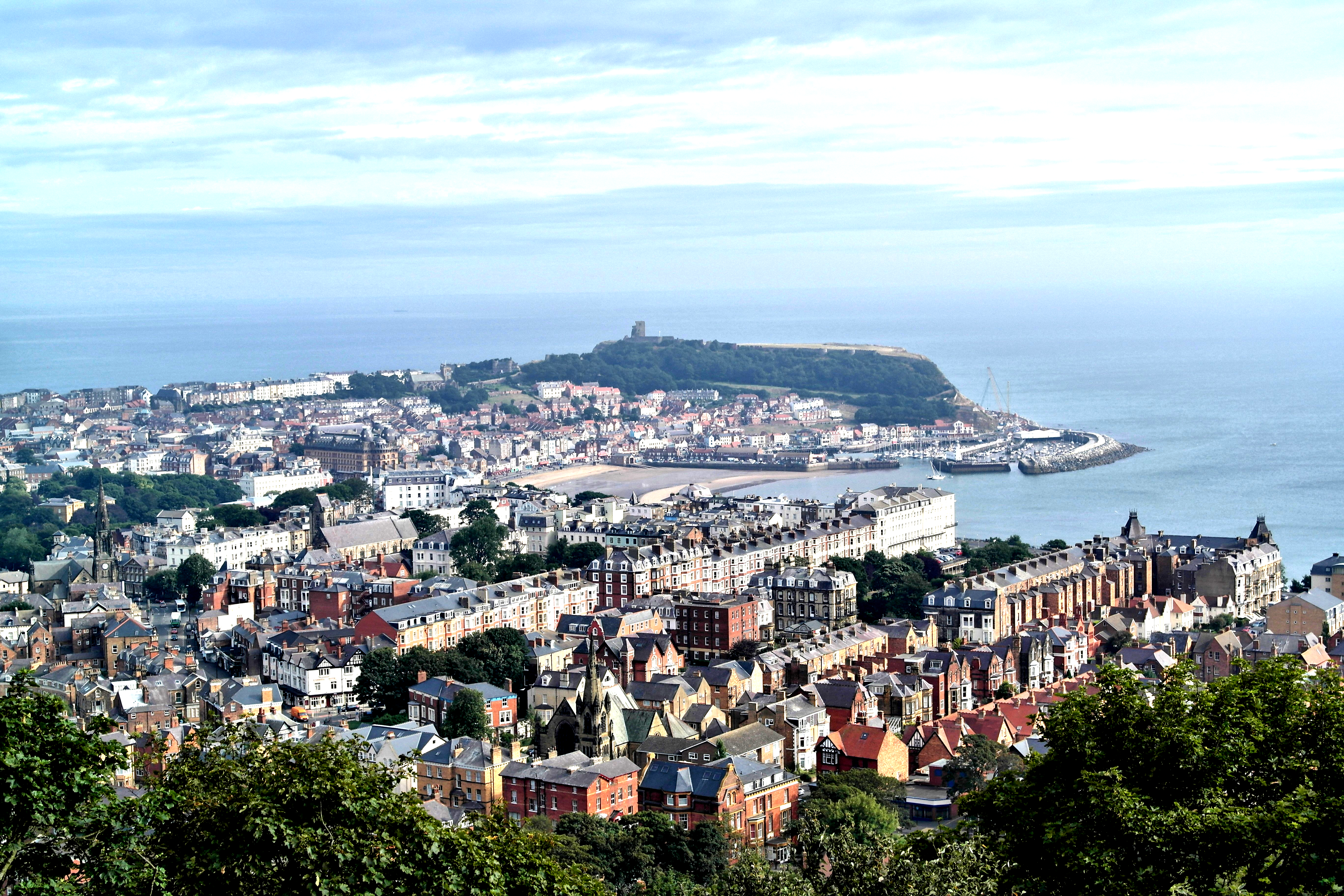
Scarborough

Scarborough and Whitby is a constituency in North Yorkshire in England. Its largest town is Scarborough, which has a population of around 61,000 when taken together with the adjacent town of Eastfield. Other settlements include the town of Whitby and the village of East Ayton.

This is a large, rural constituency covering towns and villages along Yorkshire's North Sea coast. Most of its area is taken up by the North York Moors, an upland region of heather moors with many deep dales. This coastal area contains numerous holiday parks and picturesque villages like Staithes and Robin Hood's Bay.

The towns of Scarborough and Whitby were traditionally reliant on the fishing industry. This sector has largely declined and today the tourism industry is a major part of the local economy; this area is the most-visited tourist location in England outside of London. There are high levels of deprivation in the towns of Scarborough and Whitby whilst the rural areas and the towns' suburbs are wealthier. House prices across the constituency are similar to the rest of Yorkshire and lower than the UK average.

Scarborough and Whitby has a large retired population and a low proportion of young adults. Residents have low rates of income and average levels of homeownership. The child poverty rate is above-average. Residents have low levels of education and a high proportion work in the tourism, manufacturing and agriculture sectors. The percentage claiming unemployment benefits is low. White people made up 97% of the population at the 2021 census.

At the local council, Scarborough is represented by Labour Party councillors whilst the rest of the constituency elected Conservatives. Voters in Scarborough and Whitby strongly supported leaving the European Union in the 2016 referendum; an estimated 61% voted in favour of Brexit compared to the UK-wide figure of 52%.

== History ==
The constituency name has had two separate periods of existence.

1918–1974:

A Scarborough and Whitby division of the North Riding of Yorkshire was created by the Representation of the People Act 1918 after the Boundary Commission of 1917 and first elected a Member of Parliament in the 1918 general election. This division took the entirety of the abolished Parliamentary borough of Scarborough together with the majority of the previous Whitby division and a very small part of Cleveland division (Note: The parishes of Westerdale and Commondale). It had a population, in the middle of 1914, of 72,979. The Boundary Commission had initially recommended that the division simply be called 'Scarborough' but an amendment moved by the Government during enactment of their recommendations enacted it from the outset as Scarborough and Whitby. Throughout its 56-year first creation which allowed a full franchise for all resident men it was represented by a Conservative, including during the Attlee Ministry and First Wilson Ministry.

Changes to boundaries:

The Initial Report of the Boundary Commission in 1947 made minor changes to the constituency, in line with local government changes which had abolished Guisborough Rural District in 1932 and absorbed it into Whitby Rural District. The new constituency again included the whole of Whitby Rural District, and so gained Hinderwell which was previously within Cleveland constituency. It had an electorate of 67,884 on 15 October 1946. No change was made in the First Periodical Report of the Boundary Commission in 1954.

The Second Periodical Report, published in 1969 recommended that the constituency be divided and its recommendations came into effect at the February 1974 general election abolishing the seat. The Scarborough constituency was thereby re-established, and Whitby joined with Guisborough, Loftus, Saltburn and Brotton to form Cleveland and Whitby.

By the beginning of the Third Periodical Report of the Boundary Commission, Cleveland had been created as a new county, which would normally prevent the commission from recommending a constituency crossing the border. Several representations were made to the commission to try to preserve Cleveland and Whitby constituency, but the Commission found itself unable to accept them and recommended putting Scarborough and Whitby together in a new Scarborough despite including the other coastal town, its old name, including Whitby, was finally reinstated in the next review. (Note: Still as a county constituency) This constituency did not include Pickering, which was placed in a new Ryedale constituency.

1997–present:

In the Fourth Periodical Report of the Boundary Commission for England, published in 1995 and coming into effect at the 1997 general election, the Scarborough constituency was renamed as Scarborough and Whitby with no change in boundaries.

When the constituency was recreated in 1997, the Labour candidate, Lawrie Quinn, defeated John Sykes, the sitting Conservative MP for Scarborough – one of many locally and national press-predicted unlikely gains for Labour in their landslide victory of that year. Robert Goodwill defeated Quinn in 2005 to regain the seat for Conservatives. Goodwill retained the seat at the next four elections before deciding to stand down for the 2024 election, when the seat was regained for Labour by Alison Hume.

=== Prominent members ===
Sir Herbert Paul Latham was the first sitting Member of Parliament serving in the army to have been court martialled since 1815.

Sir Alexander Spearman served as the Parliamentary Private Secretary to the President of the Board of Trade from 1951 to 1952.

Sir Robert Goodwill served in as a junior minister in both the Cameron–Clegg coalition and the second Cameron ministry.

== Boundaries ==
1918–1950: The Municipal Borough of Scarborough, the Urban Districts of Pickering, Scalby, and Whitby, the Rural Districts of Scarborough and Whitby, and parts of the Rural District of Pickering and Guisborough.

1950–1974: The Municipal Borough of Scarborough, the Urban Districts of Pickering, Scalby, and Whitby, and the Rural Districts of Scarborough and Whitby.

1997–2010: The Borough of Scarborough wards of Ayton, Castle, Cayton, Central, Danby, Derwent, Eastfield, Eskdaleside, Falsgrave, Fylingdales, Lindhead, Mayfield, Mulgrave, Newby, Northstead, Scalby, Seamer, Streonshalh, Weaponness, and Woodlands.

2010–2024: The Borough of Scarborough wards of Castle, Cayton, Central, Danby, Derwent Valley, Eastfield, Esk Valley, Falsgrave Park, Fylingdales, Lindhead, Mayfield, Mulgrave, Newby, North Bay, Northstead, Ramshill, Scalby Hackness and Staintondale, Seamer, Stepney, Streonshalh, Weaponness, Whitby West Cliff, and Woodlands.

2024–present: The District of North Yorkshire electoral divisions of: Castle; Cayton; Danby & Mulgrave; Derwent Valley & Moor; Eastfield; Esk Valley & Coast; Falsgrave & Stepney; Newby; Northstead; Scalby & the Coast; Seamer; Weaponness & Ramshill; Whitby Streonshalh; Whitby West; Woodlands.

The 2023 periodic review of Westminster constituencies, which was based on the local authority structure in place on 1 December 2020, left the boundaries unchanged. The above contents take into account the abolition of the Borough of Scarborough, which was absorbed into the new unitary authority of North Yorkshire with effect from 1 April 2023.

== Members of Parliament ==
=== MPs 1918–1974 ===
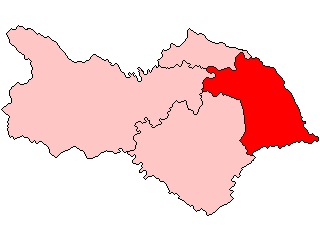
Scarborough and Whitby 1918–1950

Year	Member	Party
1918	Gervase Beckett	Unionist
1922	Sidney Herbert	Unionist
1931	Paul Latham	Conservative
1941	Alexander Spearman	Conservative
1966	Michael Shaw	Conservative
1974	constituency abolished	

=== MPs since 1997 ===
Scarborough prior to 1997

Election	Member	Party
1997	Lawrie Quinn	Labour
2005	Robert Goodwill	Conservative
2024	Alison Hume	Labour

== Elections ==
=== Elections in the 2020s ===
General election 2024: Scarborough and Whitby
Party	Candidate	Votes	%	±%
Labour	Alison Hume	17,758	40.2	+5.4
Conservative	Roberto Weeden-Sanz	12,350	27.9	−27.6
Reform	David Bowes	9,657	21.8	N/A
Liberal Democrats	Robert Lockwood	1,899	4.3	−1.8
Green	Annette Hudspeth	1,719	3.9	N/A
Yorkshire	Lee Derrick	477	1.1	−2.5
Social Justice Party	Asa Jones	285	0.6	N/A
SDP	Thomas Foster	76	0.2	N/A
Majority		5,408	12.3	N/A
Turnout		44,221	59.3	−7.5
Registered electors		74,558		
Labour gain from Conservative		Swing	+16.5	

=== Elections in the 2010s ===
General election 2019: Scarborough and Whitby
Party	Candidate	Votes	%	±%
Conservative	Robert Goodwill	27,593	55.5	+7.1
Labour	Hugo Fearnley	17,323	34.8	−6.8
Liberal Democrats	Robert Lockwood	3,038	6.1	+3.4
Yorkshire	Lee Derrick	1,770	3.6	+2.9
Majority		10,270	20.7	+13.9
Turnout		49,724	66.8	−1.8
Conservative hold		Swing	+6.9	

General election 2017: Scarborough and Whitby
Party	Candidate	Votes	%	±%
Conservative	Robert Goodwill	24,401	48.4	+5.2
Labour	Eric Broadbent	20,966	41.6	+11.4
UKIP	Sam Cross	1,682	3.3	−13.8
Liberal Democrats	Robert Lockwood	1,354	2.7	−1.8
Green	David Malone	915	1.8	−2.8
Independent	John Freeman	680	1.4	N/A
Yorkshire	Bill Black	369	0.7	N/A
Independent	Gordon Johnson	82	0.2	N/A
Majority		3,435	6.8	−6.2
Turnout		50,523	68.6	+3.7
Conservative hold		Swing	-3.1	

General election 2015: Scarborough and Whitby
Party	Candidate	Votes	%	±%
Conservative	Robert Goodwill	20,613	43.2	+0.4
Labour	Ian McInnes	14,413	30.2	+3.9
UKIP	Sam Cross	8,162	17.1	+14.1
Green	David Malone	2,185	4.6	+3.1
Liberal Democrats	Michael Beckett	2,159	4.5	−18.0
Alliance for Green Socialism	Juliet Boddington	207	0.4	+0.2
Majority		6,200	13.0	−3.5
Turnout		47,739	64.9	−0.4
Conservative hold		Swing	-1.8	

Scarborough & Whitby 1997–

General election 2010: Scarborough and Whitby
Party	Candidate	Votes	%	±%
Conservative	Robert Goodwill	21,108	42.8	+1.8
Labour	Annajoy David	12,978	26.3	−12.0
Liberal Democrats	Tania Exley-Moore	11,093	22.5	+6.5
UKIP	Michael James	1,484	3.0	+1.0
BNP	Trisha Scott	1,445	2.9	N/A
Green	Dilys Cluer	734	1.5	−1.1
Independent	Peter Popple	329	0.7	N/A
Alliance for Green Socialism	Juliet Boddington	111	0.2	N/A
Majority		8,130	16.5	+13.9
Turnout		49,282	65.3	+1.8
Conservative hold		Swing	+6.9	

=== Elections in the 2000s ===
General election 2005: Scarborough and Whitby
Party	Candidate	Votes	%	±%
Conservative	Robert Goodwill	19,248	41.0	+1.4
Labour	Lawrie Quinn	18,003	38.4	−8.8
Liberal Democrats	Tania Exley-Moore	7,495	16.0	+7.6
Green	Jonathan Dixon	1,214	2.6	+0.4
UKIP	Paul Abbott	952	2.0	0.0
Majority		1,245	2.6	N/A
Turnout		46.912	71.7	+8.5
Conservative gain from Labour		Swing	+5.1	

General election 2001: Scarborough and Whitby
Party	Candidate	Votes	%	±%
Labour	Lawrie Quinn	22,426	47.2	+1.6
Conservative	John Sykes	18,841	39.6	+3.4
Liberal Democrats	Thomas Pearce	3,977	8.4	−5.7
Green	Jonathan Dixon	1,049	2.2	N/A
UKIP	John Jacob	970	2.0	N/A
ProLife Alliance	Theresa Murray	260	0.5	N/A
Majority		3,585	7.6	−1.8
Turnout		47,523	63.2	−8.4
Labour hold		Swing		

=== Elections in the 1990s ===
General election 1997: Scarborough and Whitby
Party	Candidate	Votes	%	±%
Labour	Lawrie Quinn	24,791	45.6	+15.7
Conservative	John Sykes	19,667	36.2	−13.6
Liberal Democrats	Martin Allinson	7,672	14.1	−4.8
Referendum	Shelagh Murray	2,191	4.0	N/A
Majority		5,124	9.4	N/A
Turnout		54,321	71.6	−5.6
Labour gain from Conservative		Swing	+14.7	

=== Election in the 1970s ===
General election 1970: Scarborough & Whitby
Party	Candidate	Votes	%	±%
Conservative	Michael Shaw	26,154	49.8	+6.7
Liberal	Michael Ford Pitts	16,517	31.5	−0.3
Labour	Jean B Hewitson	9,802	18.7	−5.5
Majority		9,637	18.3	+7.0
Turnout		52,473	71.5	−2.6
Conservative hold		Swing		

=== Elections in the 1960s ===
General election 1966: Scarborough & Whitby
Party	Candidate	Votes	%	±%
Conservative	Michael Shaw	21,141	43.1	−2.9
Liberal	Richard S Rowntree	15,599	31.8	+1.9
Labour	Jack Goodhand	11,848	24.2	+0.2
Ind. Conservative	Jane Ellis	429	0.9	N/A
Majority		5,542	11.3	−4.8
Turnout		49,017	74.1	−0.8
Conservative hold		Swing		

General election 1964: Scarborough & Whitby
Party	Candidate	Votes	%	±%
Conservative	Alexander Spearman	22,632	46.0	−8.3
Liberal	Richard S Rowntree	14,725	29.9	+6.7
Labour	Peter Hardy	11,818	24.0	+1.5
Majority		7,907	16.1	−15.0
Turnout		49,175	74.9	+2.3
Conservative hold		Swing		

=== Elections in the 1950s ===
General election 1959: Scarborough & Whitby
Party	Candidate	Votes	%	±%
Conservative	Alexander Spearman	25,226	54.3	−3.6
Liberal	Gilbert Gray	10,759	23.2	+3.5
Labour	Guy Barnett	10,468	22.5	+0.1
Majority		14,467	31.1	−4.4
Turnout		46,453	72.6	0.0
Conservative hold		Swing		

General election 1955: Scarborough & Whitby
Party	Candidate	Votes	%	±%
Conservative	Alexander Spearman	27,133	57.9	−8.6
Labour	John Archer	10,488	22.4	−11.1
Liberal	Gilbert Gray	9,215	19.7	N/A
Majority		16,645	35.5	+2.5
Turnout		46,453	72.6	−3.3
Conservative hold		Swing		

General election 1951: Scarborough & Whitby
Party	Candidate	Votes	%	±%
Conservative	Alexander Spearman	32,988	66.5	+11.3
Labour	Henry Brinton	16,621	33.5	+5.9
Majority		16,367	33.0	+2.4
Turnout		49,609	75.9	−4.9
Conservative hold		Swing		

General election 1950: Scarborough & Whitby
Party	Candidate	Votes	%	±%
Conservative	Alexander Spearman	28,896	55.2	+4.3
Labour	Philip Taylor	14,421	27.6	+4.8
Liberal	Ronald William Sykes	8,989	17.2	−9.1
Majority		14,475	27.6	+3.0
Turnout		52,306	80.8	+11.6
Conservative hold		Swing		

=== Elections in the 1940s ===
General election 1945: Scarborough & Whitby
Party	Candidate	Votes	%	±%
Conservative	Alexander Spearman	20,786	50.9	−3.0
Liberal	Humphrey Razzall	10,739	26.3	−12.4
Labour	Douglas H Curry	9,289	22.8	+15.4
Majority		10,047	24.6	+9.4
Turnout		40,814	69.2	−5.5
Conservative hold		Swing		

1941 Scarborough and Whitby by-election
Party	Candidate	Votes	%	±%
Conservative	Alexander Spearman	12,518	60.8	+6.9
Independent Progressive	William Hipwell	8,086	39.2	N/A
Majority		4,432	21.6	+6.4
Turnout		20,604	35.9	−38.8
Conservative hold		Swing		

General Election 1939–40:

Another general election was required to take place before the end of 1940. The political parties had been making preparations for an election to take place from 1939 and by the end of this year, the following candidates had been selected;

- Conservative: Alexander Spearman
- Liberal: Margery Corbett-Ashby

=== Elections in the 1930s ===
General election 1935: Scarborough & Whitby
Party	Candidate	Votes	%	±%
Conservative	Paul Latham	23,210	53.9	−29.1
Liberal	Ramsay Muir	16,668	38.7	N/A
Labour	T Wilson Coates	3,195	7.4	−9.6
Majority		6,542	15.19	−50.7
Turnout		43,073	74.7	+5.2
Conservative hold		Swing		

General election 1931: Scarborough & Whitby
Party	Candidate	Votes	%	±%
Conservative	Paul Latham	32,025	82.97	
Labour	Philip Sidney Eastman	6,575	17.03	
Majority		25,450	65.94	
Turnout		38,600	69.49	
Conservative hold		Swing		

1931 Scarborough and Whitby by-election
Party	Candidate	Votes	%	±%
Conservative	Paul Latham	21,618	52.7	+4.4
Liberal	Ramsay Muir	19,429	47.3	+6.4
Majority		2,189	5.4	−2.0
Turnout		41,047	75.5	−4.2
Conservative hold		Swing	-1.0	

=== Elections in the 1920s ===
General election 1929: Scarborough and Whitby
Party	Candidate	Votes	%	±%
Unionist	Sidney Herbert	20,710	48.3	−9.2
Liberal	Henry Gisborne	17,549	40.9	+6.7
Labour	Howard Doncaster Rowntree	4,645	10.8	+2.5
Majority		3,161	7.4	−15.9
Turnout		42,899	79.7	+0.8
Unionist hold		Swing	-8.0	

General election 1924: Scarborough and Whitby
Party	Candidate	Votes	%	±%
Unionist	Sidney Herbert	18,911	57.5	+2.3
Liberal	Ashley Mitchell	11,223	34.2	−14.2
Labour	Howard Doncaster Rowntree	2,713	8.3	N/A
Majority		7,688	23.3	+20.1
Turnout		32,847	78.9	+2.5
Unionist hold		Swing		

General election 1923: Scarborough and Whitby
Party	Candidate	Votes	%	±%
Unionist	Sidney Herbert	15,927	51.6	−3.6
Liberal	Ashley Mitchell	14,933	48.4	+3.6
Majority		994	3.2	−7.2
Turnout		30,860	76.4	+0.2
Unionist hold		Swing	-3.6	

General election 1922: Scarborough and Whitby
Party	Candidate	Votes	%	±%
Unionist	Sidney Herbert	16,358	55.2	−1.6
Liberal	Sydney Peverill Turnball	13,262	44.8	+6.3
Majority		3,096	10.4	−7.7
Turnout		29,620	76.2	+16.1
Unionist hold		Swing		

=== Elections in the 1910s ===
General election 1918: Scarborough & Whitby
Party		Candidate	Votes	%	±%
C	Unionist	Gervase Beckett	11,764	56.6	
	Liberal	Osbert Sitwell	7,994	38.5	
	Labour	John Watson Rowntree	1,025	4.9	
Majority			3,770	18.1	
Turnout			20,783	60.1	
	Unionist win (new seat)				
C indicates candidate endorsed by the coalition government.

== See also ==
- List of parliamentary constituencies in North Yorkshire
- List of parliamentary constituencies in the Yorkshire and the Humber (region)
- Wayback Machine www.annajoydavid.org.uk

== Sources ==
- Craig, F. W. S. (1983) [1969]. British parliamentary election results 1918–1949 (3rd ed.). Chichester: Parliamentary Research Services. p. 509. ISBN 0-900178-06-X.
