= Labour Party (UK) election results (1922–1929) =

UK political party election results

This article lists the Labour Party's election results from the 1922 United Kingdom general election to 1929, including by-elections.

All candidates were sponsored, in some cases by the Divisional Labour Party (noted as "Constituency"). During this period, full details of the sponsorship of candidates were not reported; where known, they are listed.

== Summary of general election performance ==
Year	Number of candidates	Total votes	Average votes per candidate	% UK vote	Change (percentage points)	Lost deposits	Number of MPs
1922	414	4,237,349	10,235	29.1	+8.3	7	142
1923	427	4,267,831	9,994	30.7	+1.6	17	191
1924	514	5,281,626	10,275	24.6	-6.1	28	151

== Sponsorship of candidates ==
Sponsor	Candidates 22	MPs 22	Candidates 23	MPs 23	Candidates 24	MPs 24
CLP	unknown	19	unknown	38	unknown	24
Co-op	11	4	10	6	10	5
Fabian	unknown	1	unknown	2	unknown	1
ILP	55	32	89	45	87	37
SDF	2	1	5	4	4	3
Trade union	157	86	129	102	144	88

Details of the sponsorship of candidates by the Co-operative Party and ILP nominees in 1922, 1923 and 1924 were published by those organisations. Other figures were not collected and are therefore not known with certainty, but estimates of the number of trade union-sponsored candidates come from James Parker's Trade unions and the political culture of the British Labour Party, 1931-1940.

== Election results ==
=== 1922 general election ===
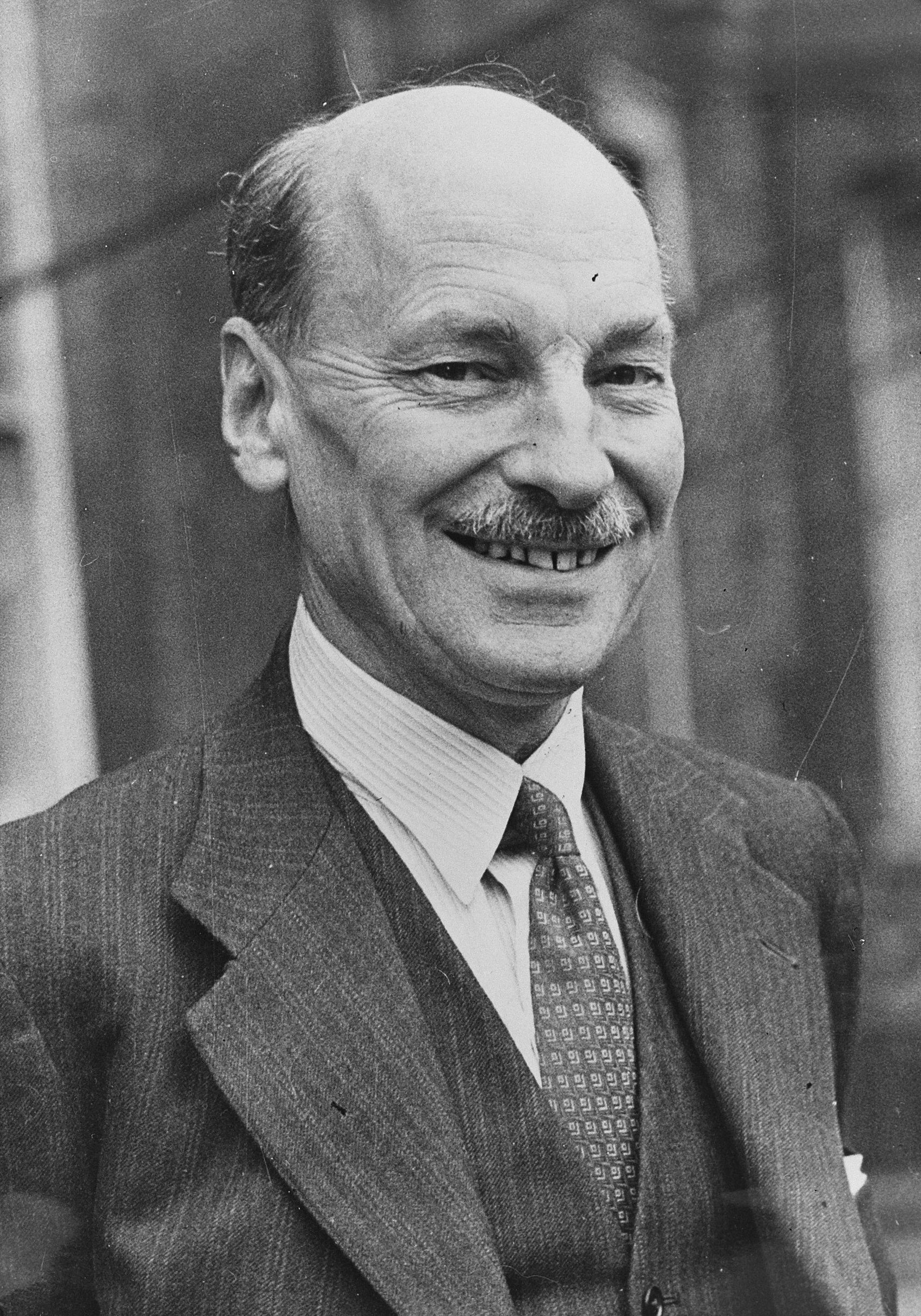
Clement Attlee, future party leader, elected for the first time in Limehouse

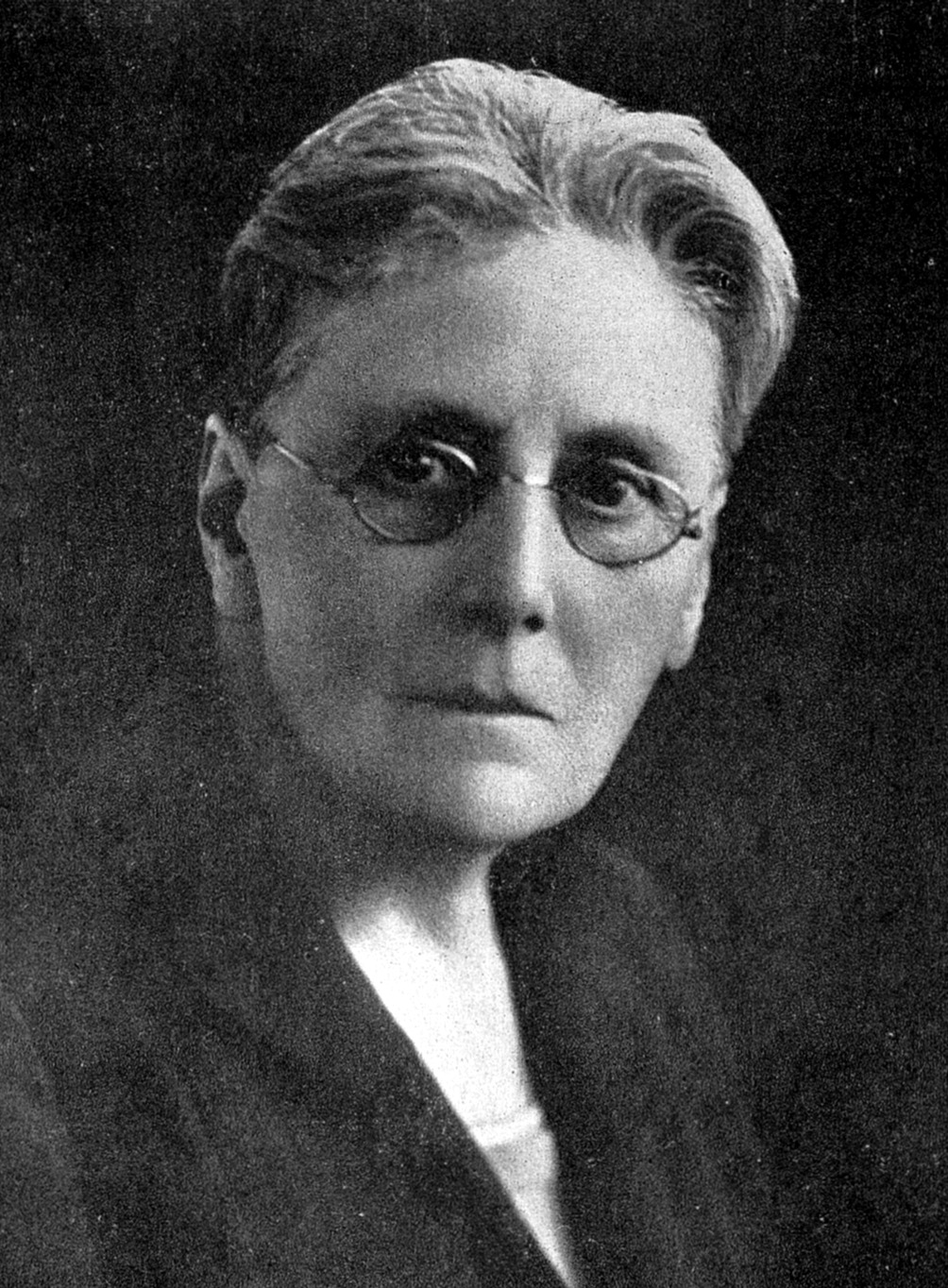
Ethel Bentham, candidate in Islington East

Constituency	Candidate	Votes	%	Position	Sponsor
Aberavon	Ramsay Macdonald	14,138	46.6	1	ILP
Aberdare	George Hall	20,704	57.2	1	Miners
Aberdeen North	Frank Herbert Rose	10,958	55.7	1	Engineering
Abertillery	George Barker	unopposed	N/A	1	Miners
Accrington	Charles Roden Buxton	16,462	44.2	1	ILP
Acton	Mary Richardson	5,342	26.2	2	Constituency
Altrincham	George Benson	4,930	13.7	3	
Ashford	Basil Noble	6,977	30.9	2	Constituency
Ashton-under-Lyne	Tom Gillinder	8,834	42.4	2	Engineering
Ayr Burghs	John McDiarmid Airlie	6,533	26.0	3	Boilermakers
Banbury	Ernest Bennett	6,463	24.1	2	Constituency
Barnard Castle	John Swan	8,052	49.3	2	Miners
Barnsley	John Potts	14,728	55.1	1	Constituency
Barrow-in-Furness	John Bromley	14,551	46.9	2	Locomotive Engineers
Basingstoke	Samuel Ledbury	3,035	13.6	3	Engineering
Bassetlaw	Henry Joseph Odell	10,502	44.8	2	
Bath	Herbert Elvin	4,849	17.8	3	Clerks
Batley and Morley	Ben Turner	15,005	46.2	1	Textile Workers
Battersea South	Albert Winfield	11,050	38.5	2	Municipal Employees
Bedford	Arthur Sells	5,477	20.5	3	Constituency
Bedwellty	Charles Edwards	17,270	63.0	1	Miners
Belper	Oliver Wright	7,942	38.9	2	Miners
Bermondsey West	Alfred Salter	7,550	44.6	1	ILP
Berwick and Haddington	Robert Spence	5,842	29.3	2	Constituency
Birkenhead West	William Henry Egan	10,371	46.0	2	Boilermakers
Birmingham Aston	Joe Cotter	10,279	39.2	2	Marine Workers
Birmingham Deritend	Fred Longden	6,892	28.8	2	Constituency
Birmingham Duddeston	Michael Brothers	8,331	38.9	2	Textile Factory Workers
Birmingham King's Norton	Eleanor Barton	7,017	32.8	2	Co-op
Birmingham Ladywood	Robert Dunstan	10,589	44.8	2	ILP
Birmingham Sparkbrook	Ernest Walter Hampton	6,310	23.4	3	Co-op
Birmingham West	Frank Smith	9,599	38.4	2	Constituency
Birmingham Yardley	Archibald Gossling	11,234	41.9	2	Woodworkers
Bishop Auckland	Ben Spoor	13,946	53.7	1	ILP
Blackburn	John Davies	24,049	21.7	3	ILP
Blackburn	Edward Porter	23,402	21.1	4	
Blaydon	William Whiteley	14,722	53.9	1	Miners
Bolton	Samuel Lomax	20,559	16.1	3	Railway Clerks
Bolton	William James Abraham	20,156	15.8	4	Railwaymen
Bosworth	Clement Bundock	8,740	31.8	2	Constituency
Bothwell	John Robertson	13,872	57.0	1	Miners
Bow and Bromley	George Lansbury	15,402	64.1	1	Constituency
Bradford Central	William Leach	14,296	42.4	1	ILP
Bradford East	Fred Jowett	13,573	45.4	1	ILP
Bradford North	John Palin	8,869	31.5	3	Vehicle Workers
Bradford South	William Hirst	12,353	35.3	2	Co-op
Brecon and Radnor	Edward Thomas John	9,850	32.6	2	Constituency
Bridgwater	Thomas Williams	1,598	06.7	3	
Brigg	David Quibell	9,185	37.3	2	ILP
Bristol Central	Christopher Thomson	12,303	44.1	2	Constituency
Bristol East	Luke Bateman	13,759	49.7	2	Railwaymen
Bristol North	Walter Ayles	9,567	35.4	2	ILP
Bristol South	David Vaughan	12,650	43.8	2	Constituency
Bromley	F. P. Hodes	4,735	15.4	3	Constituency
Broxtowe	George Spencer	11,699	50.8	1	Miners
Buckingham	Owen Connellan	7,343	26.3	2	Typographical
Burnley	Dan Irving	17,385	39.1	1	Social Democratic
Burslem	Andrew MacLaren	11,872	50.4	1	Constituency
Bury	Harry Wallace	9,643	36.7	2	Post Office Workers
Bute and North Ayrshire	John Paton	9,323	39.4	2	ILP
Caerphilly	Morgan Jones	13,759	57.2	1	ILP
Camberwell North	Charles Ammon	8,320	50.8	1	Post Office Workers
Camberwell North West	Hyacinth Morgan	5,182	30.9	2	
Camborne	Tom Proctor	4,502	21.9	3	Engineering
Cambridge	Alec Firth	4,810	20.9	3	
Cambridgeshire	Albert Ernest Stubbs	9,167	35.3	2	Constituency
Cannock	William Adamson	9,889	36.8	1	Workers
Canterbury	John Henry Lang Sims	5,639	28.8	2	
Cardiff Central	James Ewart Edmunds	8,169	29.4	2	ILP
Cardiff East	Arthur James Williams	7,506	31.4	3	Railwaymen
Cardiff South	David Pole	6,831	31.9	3	
Carlisle	George Middleton	7,870	37.6	1	Post Office Workers
Carnarvonshire	Robert Thomas Jones	14,016	53.0	1	North Wales Quarrymen
Chelmsford	Clara Rackham	3,767	17.6	3	
Chelsea	Bertrand Russell	4,513	25.1	2	ILP
Chester-le-Street	Jack Lawson	20,296	68.5	1	Miners
Chichester	Richard Hope	6,752	25.7	2	Constituency
Chippenham	William Robert Roberts	1,098	05.1	3	Woodworkers
Cirencester and Tewkesbury	William Robert Robins	9,195	35.8	2	Railway Clerks
City of Chester	George Muff	5,414	24.6	2	
City of Durham	Joshua Ritson	14,068	55.2	1	Miners
Clackmannan and Eastern Stirlingshire	Lauchlin MacNeill Weir	10,312	42.0	1	ILP
Clapham	Leopold Spero	4,919	21.7	2	
Clay Cross	Charles Duncan	13,206	57.9	1	Workers
Cleveland	Harry Dack	10,843	29.5	3	Miners
Clitheroe	Alfred Davies	12,911	45.3	2	Textile Factory Workers
Coatbridge	James C. Welsh	12,038	49.0	1	
Colchester	Richard Leopold Reiss	10,045	43.3	2	Constituency
Colne Valley	Philip Snowden	12,614	39.5	1	ILP
Combined English Universities	Leonard Woolf	361	12.2	4	
Consett	Herbert Dunnico	14,469	46.5	1	ILP
Coventry	Robert Williams	16,289	33.1	2	Transport & General
Crewe	Edward George Hemmerde	15,311	50.9	1	Constituency
Croydon South	H. T. Muggeridge	8,942	27.5	2	
Darlington	Will Sherwood	9,048	33.8	2	General Workers
Dartford	John Edmund Mills	14,744	43.9	2	Constituency
Darwen	John McGurk	4,528	15.8	3	Miners
Daventry	Will Rogers	8,850	40.4	2	Constituency
Deptford	Charles William Bowerman	18,512	52.6	1	Compositors
Derby	J. H. Thomas	25,215	27.0	1	Railwaymen
Derby	William Robert Raynes	21,677	23.3	4	Constituency
Dewsbury	Ben Riley	8,821	37.3	1	ILP
Doncaster	Wilfred Paling	13,437	46.5	1	Miners
Don Valley	Tom Williams	9,903	47.0	1	Miners
Dudley	James Wilson	8,522	39.8	2	Railwaymen
Dumbarton Burghs	David Kirkwood	16,397	64.5	1	Engineering
Dunbartonshire	William Martin	13,216	49.6	2	ILP
Dundee	E. D. Morel	30,292	25.6	2	Constituency
Dunfermline Burghs	William McLean Watson	11,652	50.4	1	Miners
Ealing	Alfred Chilton	6,128	28.7	2	Constituency
East Dorset	Frederick Jesse Hopkins	6,914	27.1	2	Constituency
East Grinstead	Thomas Crawford	6,527	29.0	2	Constituency
East Ham South	Alfred Barnes	10,566	48.1	1	Co-op
East Norfolk	George Edward Hewitt	4,361	19.3	3	
East Renfrewshire	Robert Nichol	9,708	42.4	1	ILP
East Surrey	Marjorie Pease	3,667	22.7	2	Constituency
Ebbw Vale	Evan Davies	16,947	65.4	1	Miners
Eccles	John Buckle	14,354	51.4	1	Boot & Shoe
Edinburgh Central	William Graham	12,876	57.9	1	ILP
Edmonton	Frank Broad	8,407	45.1	1	Engineering
Elland	William C. Robinson	10,590	36.8	1	Textile Factory Workers
Enfield	George Lathan	9,820	45.6	2	Railway Clerks
Epsom	Somerville Hastings	6,571	28.8	2	Constituency
Evesham	Robert Aldington	7,715	40.1	2	Constituency
Fareham	C. H. Hoare	6,245	26.9	2	Constituency
Farnham	Thomas Humphrey Marshall	5,312	26.7	2	Constituency
Farnworth	Thomas Greenall	13,391	45.6	1	Miners
Faversham	Stanley Morgan	11,096	44.8	2	Constituency
Finsbury	George Gillett	4,903	23.3	3	Constituency
Flintshire	David Gwynfryn Jones	6,163	16.2	3	
Forest of Dean	James Wignall	10,820	52.4	1	Transport & General Workers
Frome	Edward Gill	14,311	48.8	2	Miners
Fulham East	John Palmer	5,393	35.0	2	Transport & General Workers
Fulham West	Robert Mark Gentry	8,210	35.6	2	Bakers
Gainsborough	James Read	4,884	23.1	3	Constituency
Gateshead	John Brotherton	18,795	43.8	1	Engineering
Gillingham	Maurice Spencer	8,944	41.9	2	
Glasgow Bridgeton	James Maxton	17,890	63.7	1	ILP
Glasgow Camlachie	Campbell Stephen	15,181	53.2	1	ILP
Glasgow Cathcart	John Primrose Hay	9,137	34.0	1	ILP
Glasgow Central	Edward Rosslyn Mitchell	12,923	41.9	2	ILP
Glasgow Gorbals	George Buchanan	16,478	54.5	1	Patternmakers
Glasgow Govan	Neil Maclean	15,441	62.3	1	ILP
Glasgow Maryhill	John William Muir	13,058	47.3	1	ILP
Glasgow Pollok	Alexander Burns Mackay	5,759	24.7	2	ILP
Glasgow St Rollox	James Stewart	16,114	56.6	1	ILP
Glasgow Shettleston	John Wheatley	14,695	59.1	1	ILP
Glasgow Springburn	George Hardie	15,771	60.5	1	ILP
Glasgow Tradeston	Thomas Henderson	14,190	55.7	1	Co-op
Gloucester	Morgan Philips Price	7,871	36.0	2	
Gower	David Rhys Grenfell	13,388	54.2	1	Miners
Grantham	John Henry Jones	5,332	18.8	3	Constituency
Gravesend	George Isaacs	7,180	35.6	2	Printers Assistants
Great Yarmouth	Arthur Whiting	2,574	12.1	3	
Greenwich	Edward Timothy Palmer	10,860	39.1	2	Prudential Staff
Grimsby	Charles Franklin	14,227	37.5	2	Constituency
Guildford	William Bennett	7,514	29.4	2	Constituency
Hackney Central	Arthur Lynch	4,507	21.3	3	Constituency
Hackney South	Holford Knight	9,276	39.8	2	Constituency
Hamilton	Duncan Macgregor Graham	12,365	57.8	1	Miners
Hammersmith North	James Patrick Gardner	5,350	29.8	2	Constituency
Hammersmith South	Wyndham Albery	6,397	37.0	2	Constituency
Hanley	Myles Harper Parker	10,742	48.8	1	Enginemen
Harborough	Walter Baker	6,205	28.2	3	Post Office Workers
Hastings	Richard Davies	6,492	31.7	2	
Hemel Hempstead	John Harper Clynes	5,726	32.6	2	
Hemsworth	John Guest	14,295	63.2	1	Miners
Hendon	Charles Latham	4,669	16.8	3	Constituency
Hereford	James Jonas Dodd	4,094	23.8	2	Constituency
Hexham	George Shield	5,050	24.2	3	Miners
Heywood and Radcliffe	Walter Halls	15,334	44.6	2	Railwaymen
High Peak	Frank Anderson	7,698	27.1	2	Railway Clerks
Hitchin	Skene Mackay	8,049	38.0	2	Constituency
Holland with Boston	William Stapleton Royce	12,489	39.1	1	Constituency
Houghton-le-Spring	Robert Richardson	14,611	51.9	1	Miners
Huddersfield	James Hudson	15,673	33.5	2	ILP
Huntingdonshire	Dermot Freyer	4,697	23.6	3	
Ilford	Augustus West	5,414	17.1	3	
Ilkeston	George Oliver	9,432	40.0	1	Constituency
Ince	Stephen Walsh	17,332	67.7	1	Miners
Ipswich	Robert Jackson	14,924	46.6	2	ILP
Isle of Ely	William George Hall	5,688	21.4	3	Constituency
Isle of Wight	Harold Shearman	3,756	11.2	4	
Islington East	Ethel Bentham	5,900	22.7	3	Constituency
Islington North	Edith Picton-Turbervill	7,993	27.8	2	Constituency
Islington South	Frederick Pethick-Lawrence	6,634	30.3	3	Constituency
Islington West	William J. Lewington	4,856	25.8	3	
Jarrow	Robert John Wilson	17,208	53.9	1	Constituency
Keighley	Hastings Lees-Smith	13,978	46.3	1	ILP
Kennington	Harry Gosling	7,670	36.1	2	Constituency
Kensington North	William Joseph Jarrett	6,225	26.8	2	Constituency
Kettering	Alfred Waterson	14,024	49.5	2	Co-op
Kidderminster	John Hutchinson Bruce	9,203	31.8	2	Constituency
Kilmarnock	Robert Climie	10,752	45.3	2	ILP
King's Lynn	Robert Barrie Walker	8,683	32.7	2	Agricultural
Kingston upon Hull East	Archibald Stark	7,468	26.9	3	Constituency
Kingston upon Hull South West	John Arnott	4,859	19.1	3	ILP
Kingswinford	Charles Henry Sitch	15,232	51.6	1	Chainmakers
Kirkcaldy Burghs	Tom Kennedy	12,089	48.6	2	Social Democratic
Lambeth North	Barbara Ayrton-Gould	3,353	17.8	3	Constituency
Lanark	Thomas Scott Dickson	9,812	45.0	2	ILP
Lancaster	Fenner Brockway	9,043	31.6	2	ILP
Leeds Central	Henry Herman Slesser	7,844	27.8	2	
Leeds North	David Stewart	5,836	21.7	3	Constituency
Leeds North East	John Badlay	6,525	24.4	3	ILP
Leeds South	Henry Charleton	13,210	53.7	1	Railwaymen
Leeds South East	James O'Grady	13,676	58.9	1	Transport & General Workers
Leeds West	Thomas Stamford	12,487	48.3	2	ILP
Leek	William Bromfield	12,857	50.8	1	Midland Textile
Leicester East	George Banton	13,850	47.7	2	ILP
Leicester West	Alfred Hill	12,929	45.0	1	Boot & Shoe
Leigh	Henry Twist	15,006	45.0	1	Miners
Leith	Robert Freeman Wilson	6,567	23.5	3	
Lewes	Hugh Millier Black	5,328	32.0	2	Constituency
Leyton East	William Carter	6,300	30.9	2	Railwaymen
Leyton West	Alfred Smith	5,673	23.8	3	Constituency
Lichfield	Walter John French	9,316	46.8	2	Miners
Limehouse	Clement Attlee	9,688	55.4	1	ILP
Lincoln	Robert Arthur Taylor	10,951	41.0	2	Constituency
Linlithgowshire	Manny Shinwell	12,625	46.4	1	ILP
Liverpool Edge Hill	Jack Hayes	9,520	40.2	2	Police
Liverpool Everton	Joseph Toole	7,600	39.4	2	Constituency
Liverpool Fairfield	George Porter	5,478	27.7	2	
Liverpool Wavertree	James Vint Laughland	8,941	38.4	2	Constituency
Liverpool West Derby	David Rowland Williams	6,785	29.5	2	
Liverpool West Toxteth	Joseph Gibbins	10,209	40.4	2	
Llandaff and Barry	James Lovat-Fraser	9,031	30.4	2	Constituency
Llanelly	John Henry Williams	23,213	59.3	1	Constituency
London University	H. G. Wells	1,427	19.2	3	
Lonsdale	Thomas Marshall Scott	4,024	18.4	3	
Lowestoft	Robert Arthur Mellanby	4,511	18.1	3	Constituency
Luton	Percy Alden	7,107	23.3	3	Constituency
Macclesfield	Andrew John Penston	6,584	20.0	3	Constituency
Maidstone	Hugh Dalton	8,004	31.0	3	Constituency
Maldon	George Dallas	6,085	27.8	2	Workers
Manchester Ardwick	Thomas Lowth	14,031	52.3	1	Railwaymen
Manchester Blackley	Arnold Townend	5,580	26.8	3	Railway Clerks
Manchester Clayton	John Edward Sutton	14,789	50.0	2	Miners
Manchester Gorton	John Hodge	15,058	53.6	1	Iron & Steel
Manchester Moss Side	Thomas William Mercer	4,641	19.9	3	Co-op
Manchester Platting	J. R. Clynes	15,683	48.5	1	General Workers
Manchester Rusholme	Albert E. Wood	6,497	26.0	3	Constituency
Mansfield	William Carter	14,917	48.0	2	Miners
Merioneth	John Jones Roberts	7,070	41.7	2	
Merthyr	R. C. Wallhead	17,516	53.0	1	ILP
Middlesbrough East	Martin Henry Connolly	7,607	33.4	2	Boilermakers
Middleton and Prestwich	Matthew Burrow Farr	10,505	41.5	2	Textile Factory Workers
Midlothian and Peebles Northern	Andrew Clarke	6,942	38.3	2	
Mile End	John Scurr	5,219	35.5	2	
Montrose Burghs	John Carnegie	7,044	45.6	2	ILP
Morpeth	John Cairns	15,026	48.3	1	Miners
Neath	William Jenkins	19,566	59.5	1	Miners
Nelson and Colne	Arthur Greenwood	17,714	48.5	1	Constituency
Newark	Henry Nixon	8,378	35.2	2	Blastfurnacemen
Newcastle upon Tyne Central	Charles Trevelyan	13,709	54.2	1	ILP
Newcastle upon Tyne East	Joseph Nicholas Bell	10,084	43.1	1	NAUL
Newcastle upon Tyne West	David Adams	11,654	43.9	1	Engineering
Newcastle-under-Lyme	Josiah Wedgwood	14,503	60.2	1	ILP
Newport (Monmouthshire)	John William Bowen	16,000	45.7	2	Post Office Workers
Newton	Robert Young	12,312	55.6	1	Engineering
Normanton	Frederick Hall	16,040	73.3	1	Miners
Northampton	Margaret Bondfield	14,498	37.9	2	General Workers
North East Derbyshire	Frank Lee	9,359	33.9	1	Miners
North Lanarkshire	Joseph Sullivan	10,349	47.3	1	Miners
North Norfolk	Noel Buxton	12,004	52.2	1	Constituency
Northwich	John Williams	13,006	45.8	2	General Workers
Norwich	Herbert Witard	15,609	16.9	3	ILP
Norwich	George Johnson	14,490	15.7	4	Constituency
Norwood	William Archer Hodgson	4,180	15.7	3	Constituency
Nottingham West	Arthur Hayday	10,787	49.0	1	General Workers
Nuneaton	James Stevenson	10,842	32.5	2	Miners
Ogmore	Vernon Hartshorn	17,321	55.8	1	Miners
Oldham	William John Tout	24,434	27.7	2	Textile Factory Workers
Ormskirk	James Bell	8,374	41.3	2	Textile Factory Workers
Oswestry	Thomas Morris	6,105	23.8	3	Miners
Paisley	John McLaren Biggar	14,689	49.5	2	Co-op
Peckham	Walter Ashbridge Chambers	5,964	23.6	3	Constituency
Peebles and Southern Midlothian	Joseph Westwood	6,394	36.0	1	Miners
Pembrokeshire	William James Jenkins	9,703	31.0	2	Constituency
Penistone	William Gillis	8,382	33.7	2	Miners
Penryn and Falmouth	Joseph Harris	4,482	16.6	3	Workers
Perth	William Westwood	4,651	18.9	3	Shipwrights
Peterborough	John Mansfield	8,668	30.4	2	Constituency
Petersfield	Dudley Aman	7,036	35.8	2	Constituency
Plaistow	Will Thorne	12,321	63.3	1	General Workers
Plymouth Devonport	Barrington Bates	5,742	23.2	3	
Plymouth Drake	James Gorman	8,359	31.4	2	Engineering
Plymouth Sutton	Frederick Woulfe-Brenan	10,831	36.8	2	
Pontefract	Tom Smith	9,111	38.9	1	Miners
Pontypool	Thomas Griffiths	11,198	40.6	1	Iron & Steel
Pontypridd	Thomas Isaac Mardy Jones	14,884	47.2	1	Miners
Poplar South	Samuel March	14,484	58.8	1	Transport & General Workers
Portsmouth Central	Arthur Gourd	6,126	21.4	4	Workers
Portsmouth North	Arthur Henderson	6,808	26.9	2	
Preston	Tom Shaw	26,259	27.9	1	Textile Factory Workers
Pudsey and Otley	Percy Myers	5,818	21.8	3	Constituency
Reading	Derwent Hall Caine	14,322	38.1	2	
Rhondda East	David Watts-Morgan	17,146	55.0	1	Miners
Rhondda West	William John	18,001	62.1	1	Miners
Rochdale	Stanley Burgess	15,774	38.8	1	Engineering
Romford	Albert Emil Davies	9,967	41.5	2	Constituency
Rossendale	Gilbert Wright Jones	11,029	36.5	2	Textile Factory Workers
Rother Valley	Thomas Grundy	unopposed	N/A	1	Miners
Rotherham	James Walker	16,449	49.0	2	Iron & Steel
Rotherhithe	Charles Diamond	6,703	36.3	2	Constituency
Rothwell	William Lunn	17,831	62.8	1	Miners
Royton	John B. Battle	5,776	19.6	2	Textile Factory Workers
Rugby	T. H. Holt-Hughes	4,940	19.7	3	Constituency
Rushcliffe	Norman Angell	11,261	43.2	2	Constituency
Rutherglen	William Wright	14,029	55.1	1	ILP
Rutland and Stamford	Fleming Eccles	7,236	32.9	2	General Workers
Saffron Walden	William Cash	6,797	30.1	2	Constituency
St Albans	John W. Brown	10,662	42.2	2	Constituency
St Helens	James Sexton	20,731	58.7	1	Dock Labourers
St Pancras North	John Gilbert Dale	8,165	33.6	2	Constituency
St Pancras South East	Herbert Romeril	5,609	30.5	2	Railway Clerks
St Pancras South West	George Horne	2,947	17.6	3	Constituency
Salford North	Ben Tillett	11,368	41.5	1	Transport & General Workers
Salford West	Arthur Law	8,724	32.3	2	Railwaymen
Seaham	Sidney Webb	20,203	59.9	1	Fabian
Sedgefield	John Herriotts	9,756	43.6	1	Miners
Sevenoaks	Lewis Alexander Goldie	6,849	36.2	2	Constituency
Sheffield Attercliffe	Cecil Wilson	16,206	68.2	1	Constituency
Sheffield Brightside	Arthur Ponsonby	16,692	60.4	1	ILP
Sheffield Hillsborough	A. V. Alexander	15,130	56.2	1	Co-op
Sheffield Park	Robert Morley	10,578	47.8	2	Workers
Shipley	William Mackinder	11,160	37.2	2	
Shoreditch	Ernest Thurtle	8,834	36.5	2	Constituency
Silvertown	Jack Jones	11,874	73.1	1	General Workers
Skipton	Tom Snowden	8,229	26.0	3	Constituency
Smethwick	John Davison	13,141	50.7	1	Ironfounders
Southampton	Tommy Lewis	14,868	16.1	3	Marine Workers
South Ayrshire	James Brown	11,511	55.6	1	Miners
South Derbyshire	S. Truman	10,201	29.6	2	Constituency
South Dorset	Henry Pavely	4,394	20.8	3	Constituency
South East Essex	Philip Hoffman	11,459	45.9	2	Shop Assistants
South Norfolk	George Edwards	10,159	44.4	2	Agricultural
South Shields	Will Lawther	15,735	39.7	2	Miners
Southwark Central	George Dobson Bell	5,522	34.4	2	Constituency
Southwark North	Leslie Haden-Guest	6,323	46.0	2	Constituency
Southwark South East	Thomas Naylor	7,734	43.6	2	Compositors
South West Norfolk	William Benjamin Taylor	8,655	45.3	2	
Sowerby	John William Ogden	7,496	25.5	3	Textile Factory Workers
Spelthorne	Archibald Church	7,015	35.2	2	Constituency
Spen Valley	Tom Myers	12,519	36.9	2	ILP
Spennymoor	Joseph Batey	13,766	50.3	1	Miners
Stafford	Bill Holmes	7,672	41.1	2	Agricultural
Stalybridge and Hyde	Percy Horace Wood	7,578	21.6	3	Engineering
Stirling and Clackmannan West	Tom Johnston	9,919	55.0	1	ILP
Stirling and Falkirk	Hugh Murnin	11,073	53.3	1	Scottish Miners
Stockport	Samuel Perry	17,059	16.7	3	Co-op
Stockport	James C. H. Robinson	16,126	15.8	4	Woodworkers
Stockton-on-Tees	Frederick Fox Riley	11,183	34.3	2	Post Office Workers
Stoke	John Watts	10,522	38.7	2	
Stratford	Thomas Edward Groves	10,017	46.8	1	Constituency
Stretford	Alfred Harley Turner	8,733	31.1	2	
Stroud	Samuel Edward Walters	5,081	17.6	3	Boilermakers
Sunderland	David Baxter Lawley	13,683	12.2	4	Blind
Sunderland	Vickerman Rutherford	13,490	12.1	5	Constituency
Swansea East	David Williams	11,333	50.9	1	ILP
Swansea West	Howel Walter Samuel	8,401	32.1	3	Fabian
Swindon	Joseph Compton	11,502	43.6	2	Vehicle Builders
The Wrekin	Richard Edward Jones	10,603	47.6	2	Engineers
Thornbury	Joseph Herbert Alpass	5,749	21.3	3	Constituency
Tiverton	Frederick Brown	1,457	06.6	3	
Tonbridge	Joseph Thomas Davies	7,665	27.4	2	Constituency
Tottenham North	Robert Morrison	10,250	44.2	1	Co-op
Tottenham South	R. H. Tawney	8,241	37.1	2	Constituency
Tynemouth	George Harold Humphrey	5,362	22.9	3	
University of Wales	Olive Wheeler	309	24.8	3	
Upton	Benjamin Gardner	7,268	32.8	2	ILP
Uxbridge	William Brown	7,292	31.0	2	Civil Service Clerks
Wakefield	Albert Bellamy	9,798	48.5	2	Railwaymen
Wallsend	Patrick Hastings	14,248	46.8	1	Constituency
Walsall	Robert Dennison	8,946	23.6	3	Iron & Steel
Walthamstow East	William Bridgland Steer	6,382	32.6	2	Constituency
Walthamstow West	Valentine McEntee	8,758	43.3	1	Woodworkers
Wandsworth Central	Lewis Silkin	5,420	30.3	2	
Wansbeck	George Warne	16,032	45.2	1	
Warrington	James Gregory	13,570	46.9	2	Constituency
Watford	James Joseph Mallon	8,561	34.9	2	Constituency
Wednesbury	Alfred Short	16,087	50.2	1	Boilermakers
Wellingborough	Walter Smith	11,057	42.4	2	Boot & Shoe
Wells	Len Smith	4,048	18.9	3	Boot & Shoe
Wentworth	George Henry Hirst	unopposed	N/A	1	Miners
West Bromwich	Frederick Owen Roberts	14,210	50.6	1	Typographical
Westbury	George Ward	4,572	19.3	3	Constituency
West Dorset	T. C. Duke	7,101	37.9	3	Constituency
West Fife	William Adamson	unopposed	N/A	1	Miners
Westhoughton	Rhys Davies	14,846	55.4	1	Distributive Workers
Westminster Abbey	Joseph George Butler	2,454	13.6	2	Constituency
West Renfrewshire	Robert Murray	11,787	54.0	1	ILP
Whitechapel and St George's	Charles James Mathew	6,267	40.2	1	Constituency
Whitehaven	Thomas Gavan-Duffy	10,935	45.3	1	Cumberland Iron Ore Miners
Widnes	Arthur Henderson	12,897	46.8	2	Ironfounders
Wigan	John Parkinson	20,079	56.5	1	Miners
Willesden West	Samuel Viant	12,529	48.5	2	Woodworkers
Winchester	Alexander Haycock	7,535	34.7	2	Constituency
Wirral	John Edward Cameron Grant	4,363	17.3	3	
Wolverhampton Bilston	John Baker	10,392	45.8	2	Iron & Steel
Wolverhampton East	William Thomas Augustus Foot	3,076	12.2	3	Railwaymen
Wolverhampton West	Alexander Walkden	15,190	46.1	2	Railway Clerks
Woodbridge	E. J. C. Neep	9,476	43.3	2	Constituency
Wood Green	Harri Tudor Rhys	9,411	30.0	2	Constituency
Woolwich East	Harry Snell	15,620	57.1	1	Constituency
Woolwich West	John Thomas Sheppard	9,550	39.8	2	Engineering
Workington	Thomas Cape	14,546	54.7	1	Miners
Wrexham	Robert Richards	11,940	35.8	1	Constituency
Wycombe	Samuel Stennett	4,403	14.1	3	Woodworkers
Yeovil	William Kelly	9,581	38.3	2	Engineering
York	Thomas Gill	10,106	29.6	2	Railway Clerks

Morel in Dundee and Tout in Oldham were elected by taking second place in a two-seat constituency.

=== By-elections, 1922–1923 ===
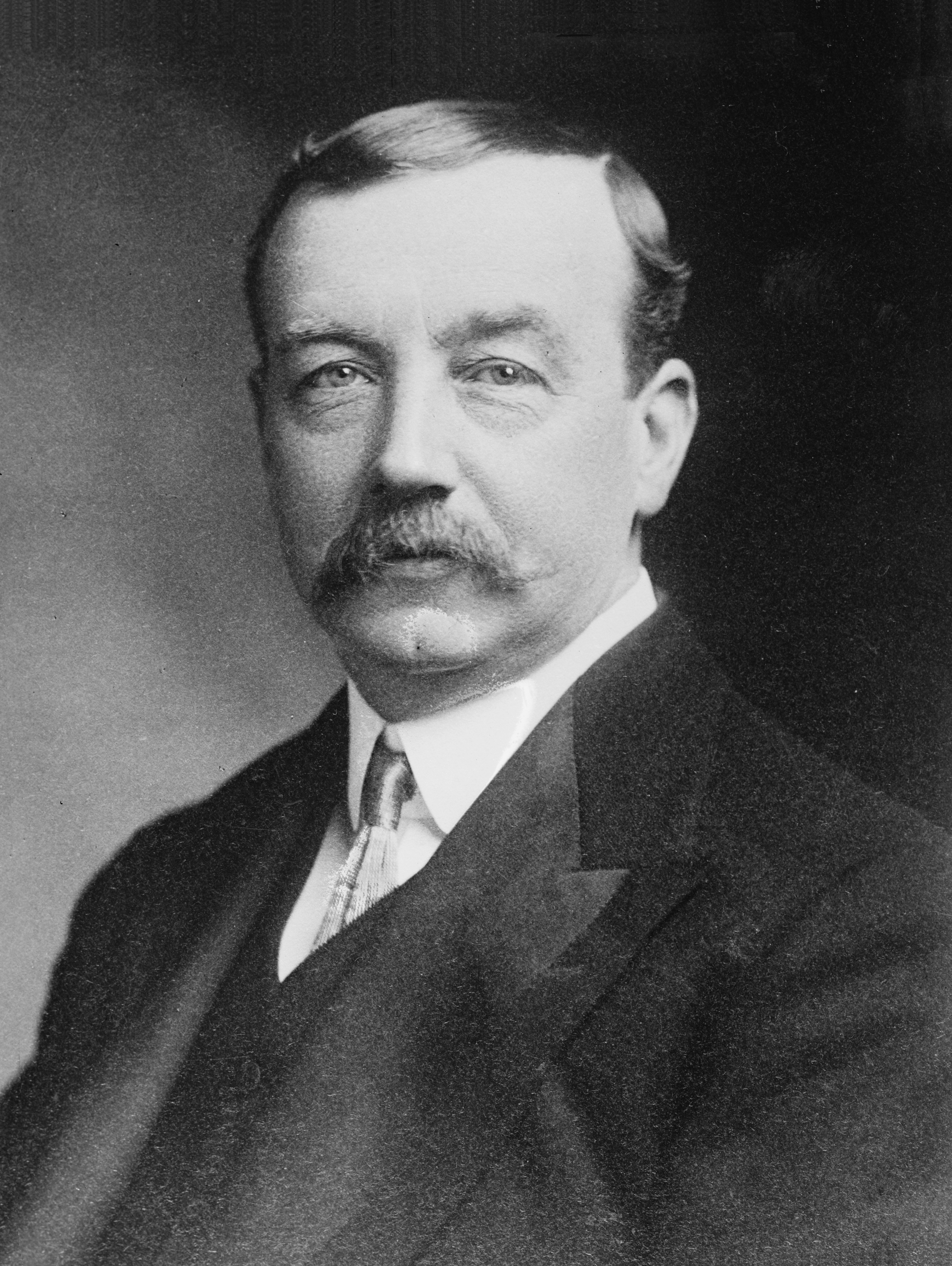
Arthur Henderson, winner of the 1923 Newcastle East by-election

By-election	Candidate	Votes	%	Position	Sponsor
1923 Newcastle-upon-Tyne East by-election	Arthur Henderson	11,066	45.7	1	
1923 Whitechapel and St George's by-election	Harry Gosling	8,398	57.0	1	
1923 Darlington by-election	Will Sherwood	11,271	43.4	2	
1923 Mitcham by-election	James Chuter Ede	8,029	38.0	1	
1923 Liverpool Edge Hill by-election	Jack Hayes	10,300	52.7	1	
1923 Anglesey by-election	Edward Thomas John	6,368	30.5	2	
1923 Ludlow by-election	Percy F. Pollard	1,420	7.8	3	ILP
1923 Berwick-upon-Tweed by-election	Gilbert Oliver	3,966	18.2	3	
1923 Morpeth by-election	Robert Smillie	20,053	60.5	1	
1923 Leeds Central by-election	Henry Slesser	11,359	41.4	2	
1923 Rutland and Stamford by-election	Arthur Sells	8,406	42.9	2	
1923 Yeovil by-election	William Thomas Kelly	8,140	28.7	2	

=== 1923 general election ===
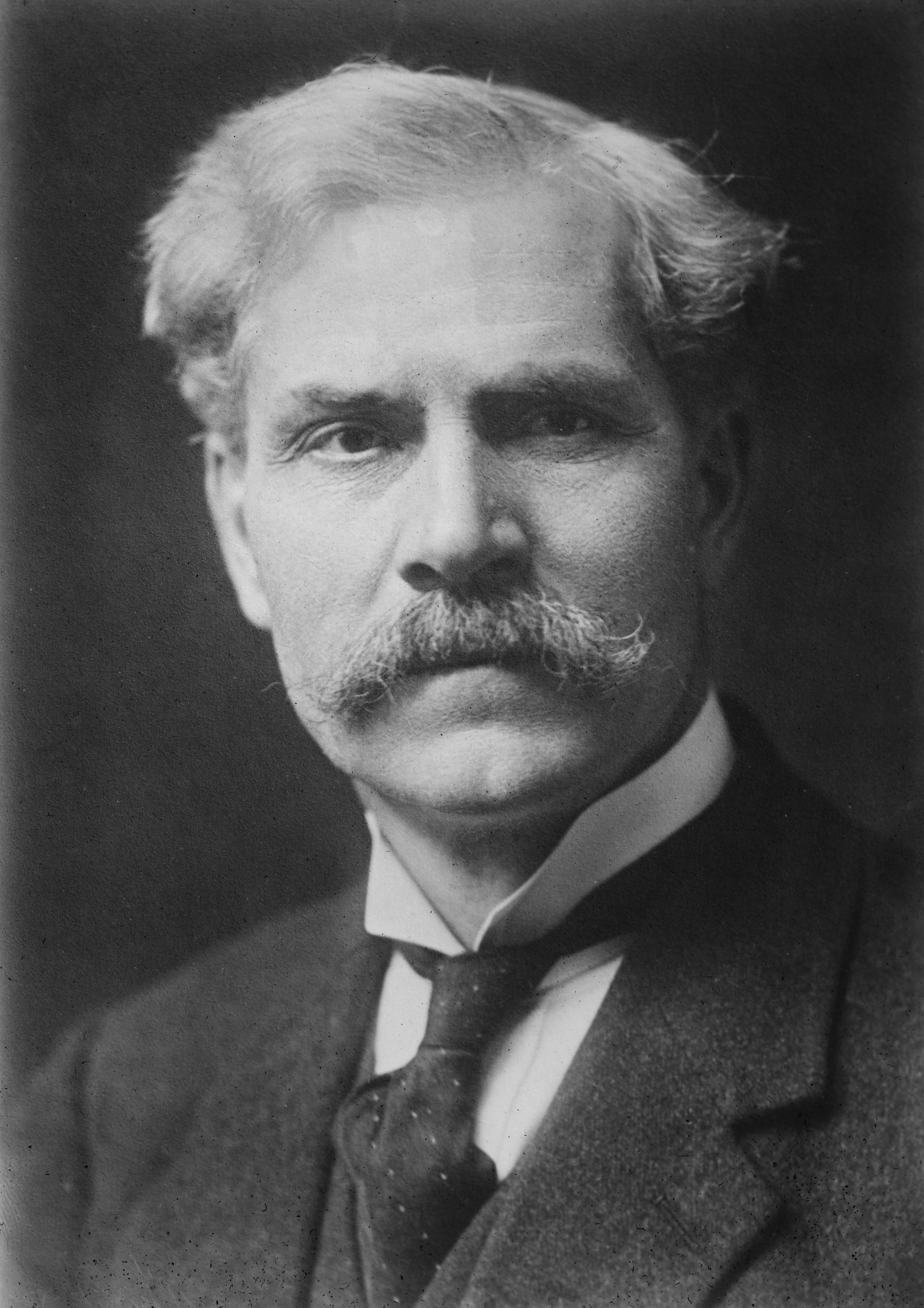
Ramsay MacDonald, party leader, elected in Aberavon, became Prime Minister shortly after

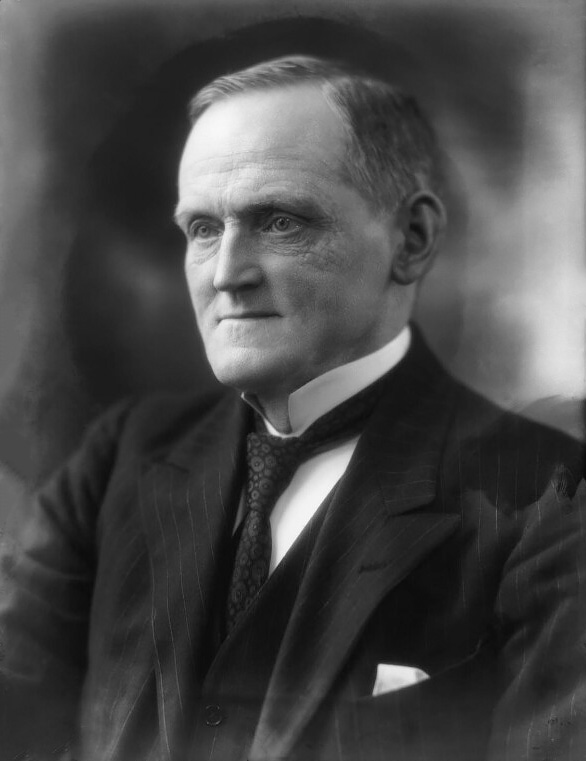
Philip Snowden, victor in Colne Valley

Constituency	Candidate	Votes	%	Position	Sponsor
Aberavon	Ramsay MacDonald	17,439	55.6	1	ILP
Aberdare	George Hall	22,379	58.2	1	Miners
Aberdeen North	Frank Herbert Rose	9,138	50.6	1	Engineering
Aberdeen South	John Paton	6,911	29.0	2	ILP
Abertillery	George Barker	unopposed	N/A	1	Miners
Accrington	Charles Roden Buxton	16,793	45.7	2	ILP
Acton	Herbert Alphonsus Baldwin	6,069	28.9	2	ILP
Ashford	Basil Noble	7,709	37.9	2	
Ashton-under-Lyne	Ellen Wilkinson	6,208	28.7	3	Distributive Workers
Aylesbury	Fred Watkins	1,275	04.5	3	
Ayr Burghs	John McDiarmid Airlie	7,732	31.7	2	Boilermakers
Balham and Tooting	Edward Archbold	5,536	21.5	3	
Banbury	Ernest Bennett	2,500	09.2	3	
Barkston Ash	George Lewis Ward	7,964	30.3	2	
Barnard Castle	Moss Turner-Samuels	9,171	55.1	1	
Barnsley	John Potts	12,674	48.0	1	Miners
Barnstaple	Richard W. Gifford	1,225	04.1	3	
Barrow-in-Furness	John Bromley	13,576	46.0	2	Locomotive Engineers
Bassetlaw	Malcolm MacDonald	6,973	28.3	3	
Batley and Morley	Ben Turner	14,964	52.6	1	Textile Workers
Battersea South	Albert Winfield	13,440	48.0	2	
Bedfordshire Mid	Robert Leonard Wigzell	1,567	07.1	3	
Bedwellty	Charles Edwards	17,564	67.6	1	Miners
Belper	Oliver Wright	7,284	31.5	2	Miners
Bermondsey West	Alfred Salter	8,298	47.5	2	ILP
Berwick and Haddington	Robert Spence	8,576	37.0	1	
Berwick-upon-Tweed	Edna Martha Penny	2,784	12.5	3	
Bethnal Green North East	Walter Windsor	7,415	45.7	1	ILP
Bethnal Green South West	Joe Vaughan	5,251	39.6	2	
Bilston	John Baker	9,085	37.1	2	Iron & Steel
Birkenhead West	William Henry Egan	12,473	55.8	1	Boilermakers
Birmingham Aston	Percival Bower	7,541	31.8	2	
Birmingham Deritend	Fred Longden	9,396	43.9	2	
Birmingham Duddeston	George Francis Sawyer	7,309	37.2	2	
Birmingham Erdington	Albert Edward Eyton	7,574	34.0	2	
Birmingham King's Norton	Eleanor Barton	6,743	30.7	2	Co-op
Birmingham Ladywood	Robert Dunstan	11,330	46.8	2	ILP
Birmingham Sparkbrook	Ernest Walter Hampton	5,948	24.6	2	
Birmingham West	Frank Smith	9,983	41.7	2	
Birmingham Yardley	Archibald Gossling	11,562	46.5	2	Woodworkers
Bishop Auckland	Ben Spoor	13,328	51.2	1	ILP
Blackburn	Edward Porter	21,903	20.5	4	
Blackburn	John Davies	25,428	23.8	3	ILP
Blaydon	William Whiteley	15,073	67.9	1	Miners
Bolton	Albert Law	25,133	18.6	1	Textile Factory Workers
Bolton	Fleming Eccles	21,045	15.6	5	
Bootle	John Kinley	3,272	13.8	3	ILP
Bosworth	Emrys Hughes	8,152	28.9	3	ILP
Bothwell	John Robertson	14,211	60.2	1	Miners
Bournemouth	Minnie Pallister	5,986	19.5	3	ILP
Bow and Bromley	George Lansbury	15,336	68.8	1	
Bradford Central	William Leach	14,241	44.6	1	ILP
Bradford East	Fred Jowett	13,579	48.1	1	ILP
Bradford North	Thomas Blythe	9,036	32.7	3	
Bradford South	William Hirst	11,543	34.9	2	Co-op
Brentford and Chiswick	William Haywood	3,216	18.2	3	
Brigg	David Quibell	10,753	46.4	2	ILP
Brighton	Alban Gordon	9,545	08.5	5	
Brighton	Herbert Carden	9,040	08.0	6	
Bristol Central	Samuel Edward Walters	11,932	45.3	2	Boilermakers
Bristol East	Walter Baker	14,824	53.7	1	Post Office Workers
Bristol North	Walter Ayles	10,433	37.5	1	ILP
Bristol South	David Vaughan	13,701	47.3	2	
Bromley	Glenvil Hall	3,992	13.3	3	
Broxtowe	George Spencer	13,219	54.5	1	Miners
Buckingham	E. J. Pay	11,824	47.0	2	Social Democratic
Burnley	Dan Irving	16,848	37.8	1	Social Democratic
Burslem	Andrew MacLaren	12,480	49.9	2	
Bury	Harry Wallace	9,568	36.1	2	Post Office Workers
Bute and Northern Ayrshire	Peter Campbell Stephen	9,855	44.4	2	ILP
Caernarvonshire	Robert Jones	13,521	47.3	2	
Caerphilly	Morgan Jones	16,535	58.7	1	ILP
Camberwell North	Charles Ammon	10,620	64.2	1	Post Office Workers
Camberwell North West	Hyacinth Morgan	6,763	34.4	2	
Cambridge	Alec Firth	5,741	24.5	3	
Cambridgeshire	A. E. Stubbs	8,554	31.8	2	
Cannock	William Adamson	11,956	41.4	1	Workers
Cardiff Central	James Ewart Edmunds	8,563	32.0	2	ILP
Cardiff East	Hugh Dalton	7,812	32.7	2	
Cardiff South	Arthur Henderson Jr	7,899	37.9	1	
Carlisle	George Middleton	9,120	40.5	1	Post Office Workers
Carmarthen	Rowland Williams	7,132	24.8	3	
Chatham	Mary Hamilton	5,794	24.1	3	ILP
Chelsea	Bertrand Russell	5,047	27.5	2	ILP
Chester	George Muff	5,773	26.3	3	
Chesterfield	George Benson	6,198	25.9	2	ILP
Chester-le-Street	Jack Lawson	20,712	74.7	1	Miners
Chorley	Zeph Hutchinson	12,179	45.3	2	Textile Factory Workers
Cirencester and Tewkesbury	William Robert Robins	7,849	33.8	2	Railway Clerks
Clackmannan and Eastern Stirlingshire	Lauchlin MacNeill Weir	10,492	51.1	1	ILP
Clapham	Leopold Spero	6,404	28.9	2	
Clay Cross	Charles Duncan	11,939	56.0	1	Workers
Cleveland	Robert Dennison	9,683	27.8	3	Iron & Steel
Clitheroe	Alfred Davies	11,469	37.9	2	Textile Factory Workers
Coatbridge	James C. Welsh	12,292	55.5	1	
Colchester	Richard Leopold Reiss	8,316	34.2	2	
Colne Valley	Philip Snowden	13,136	40.4	1	ILP
Combined English Universities	Joseph John Findlay	850	21.9	3	
Consett	Herbert Dunnico	15,862	52.0	1	ILP
Coventry	A. A. Purcell	16,346	34.2	1	Furnishing Trades
Crewe	Edward Hemmerde	14,628	46.5	1	
Croydon North	Gilbert Foan	10,054	37.0	2	ILP
Croydon South	H. T. Muggeridge	9,926	31.6	2	
Darlington	Will Sherwood	9,284	33.6	2	
Dartford	John Edmund Mills	18,329	54.2	1	
Darwen	George Thompson	3,527	12.1	3	
Daventry	Len Smith	4,127	17.5	3	Boot & Shoe
Deptford	C. W. Bowerman	21,576	63.0	1	Compositors
Derby	J. H. Thomas	24,887	29.0	1	Railwaymen
Derby	William Robert Raynes	20,318	23.7	2	
Dewsbury	Ben Riley	8,923	44.4	2	ILP
Don Valley	Tom Williams	12,898	60.4	1	Miners
Doncaster	Wilfred Paling	16,198	60.6	1	Miners
Dudley	R. F. Smith	1,958	09.5	3	
Dumbarton Burghs	David Kirkwood	13,472	61.3	1	
Dunbartonshire	William Martin	11,705	43.0	1	ILP
Dundee	E. D. Morel	23,345	22.7	2	
Dunfermline Burghs	William McLean Watson	12,606	53.6	1	Miners
Durham	Joshua Ritson	13,819	56.8	1	Miners
Ealing	Alfred Chilton	4,495	19.3	3	
East Dorset	Frederick Jesse Hopkins	5,760	22.3	3	
East Grinstead	Thomas Crawford	6,451	31.2	2	
East Ham North	Susan Lawrence	8,727	35.7	1	
East Ham South	Alfred Barnes	11,402	49.2	1	Co-op
East Norfolk	George Edward Hewitt	3,530	14.8	3	
East Renfrewshire	Robert Nichol	9,857	44.6	1	ILP
Ebbw Vale	Evan Davies	16,492	65.6	1	Miners
Eccles	John Buckle	12,267	42.7	1	Boot & Shoe
Edinburgh Central	William Graham	13,186	67.9	1	ILP
Edinburgh West	George Mathers	6,836	25.7	3	
Edmonton	Frank Broad	10,735	64.4	1	Engineering
Elland	William C. Robinson	12,031	49.1	2	Textile Factory Workers
Enfield	William Henderson	11,050	52.8	1	
Epsom	John Langdon-Davies	5,807	29.0	2	
Evesham	Robert Aldington	3,705	18.4	3	
Exeter	Lothian Small	7,123	32.3	2	
Eye	Charles Wye Kendall	2,984	12.8	3	
Fareham	Joseph Bowron Baker	6,526	30.6	2	
Farnham	Anne Corner	3,520	16.7	3	
Farnworth	Thomas Greenall	14,858	57.2	1	Miners
Faversham	Stanley Morgan	12,361	47.9	2	
Finsbury	George Gillett	8,907	42.4	1	
Forest of Dean	James Wignall	11,486	60.9	1	Transport & General Workers
Frome	Frederick Gould	15,902	54.4	1	
Fulham East	John Palmer	7,683	34.5	2	Transport & General Workers
Fulham West	Robert Mark Gentry	8,687	34.4	2	
Gainsborough	James Read	3,039	14.8	3	
Gateshead	John Brotherton	16,689	41.1	2	Engineering
Gillingham	Maurice Spencer	7,674	34.7	2	
Glasgow Bridgeton	James Maxton	15,735	64.8	1	ILP
Glasgow Camlachie	Campbell Stephen	14,143	56.2	1	ILP
Glasgow Cathcart	John Primrose Hay	8,884	34.7	2	ILP
Glasgow Central	Edward Mitchell	12,976	44.4	2	ILP
Glasgow Gorbals	George Buchanan	17,211	67.2	1	
Glasgow Govan	Neil Maclean	13,987	66.3	1	ILP
Glasgow Hillhead	John L. Kinloch	5,059	26.4	2	ILP
Glasgow Maryhill	John William Muir	12,508	48.1	1	ILP
Glasgow Partick	Andrew Young	8,397	44.0	1	Co-op
Glasgow Pollok	John Rankin	6,836	32.8	2	ILP
Glasgow Shettleston	John Wheatley	12,624	59.8	1	ILP
Glasgow Springburn	George Hardie	14,535	62.3	1	ILP
Glasgow St Rollox	James Stewart	15,240	62.3	1	ILP
Glasgow Tradeston	Thomas Henderson	12,787	60.1	1	Co-op
Gloucester	M. Philips Price	8,127	35.7	2	ILP
Gower	David Rhys Grenfell	14,771	59.1	1	Miners
Grantham	Montague William Moore	5,440	18.9	3	
Gravesend	George Isaacs	9,776	43.4	1	
Great Yarmouth	Albert Wrigley	2,138	09.7	3	
Greenwich	Edward Timothy Palmer	12,314	42.7	1	Prudential Staff
Grimsby	Charles Edwin Franklin	15,959	47.6	2	
Guildford	William Bennett	5,260	19.5	3	
Hackney Central	Ernest E. Hunter	6,354	28.7	3	ILP
Hackney South	Herbert Morrison	9,578	42.8	1	
Hamilton	Duncan Macgregor Graham	11,858	58.4	1	Miners
Hammersmith North	James Patrick Gardner	8,101	41.0	1	ILP
Hammersmith South	Wyndham Albery	6,974	36.9	2	ILP
Hanley	Myles Harper Parker	11,508	53.3	1	
The Hartlepools	George Belt	2,755	07.5	3	
Hastings	Richard Davies	4,859	21.5	3	
Hemsworth	John Guest	13,159	70.1	1	Miners
Hendon	Charles Latham	5,005	19.5	3	
Hereford	Sidney Box	981	04.7	3	
Heywood and Radcliffe	Walter Halls	15,273	47.1	2	Railwaymen
High Peak	Frank Anderson	5,684	20.8	3	Railway Clerks
Hitchin	Skene Mackay	5,913	26.3	2	ILP
Holborn	Augustus West	2,044	15.4	3	
Holland with Boston	William Royce	15,697	54.1	1	
Hornsey	Christopher Francis Healy	3,487	09.8	3	
Horsham and Worthing	Ernest Stanford	8,892	33.2	2	
Houghton-le-Spring	Robert Richardson	15,225	59.3	1	Miners
Huddersfield	James Hudson	17,430	36.7	1	ILP
Ilford	Dan Chater	5,775	18.1	3	ILP
Ilkeston	George Oliver	9,191	42.1	1	
Ince	Stephen Walsh	17,365	73.5	1	Miners
Inverness	Andrew D. Kinloch	5,385	34.6	2	ILP
Ipswich	Robert Jackson	15,824	50.7	1	ILP
Isle of Ely	Richard Henry Kennard Hope	3,172	12.4	3	
Isle of Wight	Emily Palmer	2,475	07.1	3	
Islington East	Ethel Bentham	6,941	26.0	3	ILP
Islington North	George Bennett	8,556	28.9	3	
Islington South	William Cluse	7,764	37.0	1	Social Democratic
Islington West	Frederick Montague	7,955	41.4	1	Social Democratic
Jarrow	Robert John Wilson	16,570	63.9	1	
Keighley	Hastings Lees-Smith	14,083	49.1	2	ILP
Kennington	Thomas Williams	8,292	39.2	1	
Kensington North	William Joseph Jarrett	8,888	37.0	2	
Kettering	Samuel Perry	12,718	43.6	1	Co-op
Kidderminster	Louis Tolley	3,990	13.7	3	
Kilmarnock	Robert Climie	10,992	43.2	1	ILP
King's Lynn	John Stevenson	6,488	25.2	3	
Kingston upon Hull East	Archibald Stark	7,468	26.9	3	
Kingston upon Hull South West	John Arnott	5,973	23.7	3	ILP
Kingswinford	Charles Henry Sitch	15,174	49.5	1	
Kirkcaldy Burghs	Tom Kennedy	14,221	54.4	1	Social Democratic
Lambeth North	Fred Hughes	4,089	21.9	3	ILP
Lanark	Thomas Scott Dickson	11,384	50.5	1	ILP
Leeds Central	Henry Slesser	11,574	43.8	2	
Leeds North	David Stewart	5,384	20.6	3	
Leeds North East	Frank Fountain	8,574	31.3	2	
Leeds South	Henry Charleton	11,705	44.2	1	Railwaymen
Leeds South East	James O'Grady	12,210	63.2	1	Transport & General Workers
Leeds West	Thomas Stamford	11,434	40.7	1	ILP
Leek	William Bromfield	13,913	53.6	1	
Leicester East	George Banton	13,162	44.8	1	ILP
Leicester West	Frederick Pethick-Lawrence	13,634	44.6	1	
Leigh	Joe Tinker	13,989	43.0	1	Miners
Leith	Robert Freeman Wilson	8,267	35.5	2	
Lewes	Basil Hall	6,422	40.4	2	
Lewisham East	Ernest Wesley Wilton	9,604	31.4	2	
Leyton East	Archibald Church	7,944	39.5	1	ILP
Leyton West	Alfred Smith	7,536	31.2	3	Transport & General Workers
Lichfield	Frank Hodges	11,029	48.5	1	
Limehouse	Clement Attlee	11,473	68.5	1	ILP
Lincoln	Robert Arthur Taylor	9,251	34.2	2	
Linlithgowshire	Manny Shinwell	13,304	50.9	1	ILP
Liverpool Edge Hill	Jack Hayes	13,538	56.9	1	
Liverpool Everton	Henry Walker	7,673	45.5	2	
Liverpool Wavertree	James Vint Laughland	7,025	28.0	3	
Liverpool West Toxteth	Joseph Gibbins	12,318	49.7	2	
Llandaff and Barry	Thomas F. Worrall	7,871	27.0	3	ILP
Llanelly	John Henry Williams	21,063	55.1	1	
London University	H. G. Wells	1,420	17.6	3	
Loughborough	George Ernest Winterton	8,064	32.5	2	
Lowestoft	Robert Arthur Mellanby	4,788	19.7	3	ILP
Luton	Willet Ball	2,998	09.9	3	
Macclesfield	Andrew Joseph Penston	6,713	20.5	3	
Maidstone	Seymour Cocks	6,558	24.4	3	ILP
Maldon	Valentine Crittall	10,329	50.1	1	
Manchester Ardwick	Thomas Lowth	15,673	60.4	1	Railwaymen
Manchester Clayton	John Edward Sutton	17,255	56.7	1	Miners
Manchester Gorton	Joseph Compton	16,080	60.0	1	Vehicle Workers
Manchester Hulme	Andrew McElwee	8,433	30.0	3	Woodworkers
Manchester Platting	J. R. Clynes	17,078	54.8	1	General Workers
Manchester Rusholme	William Paul	5,366	21.3	3	Constituency
Mansfield	Frank Varley	18,813	57.8	1	Miners
Merioneth	John Jones Roberts	7,181	39.5	2	
Merthyr	R. C. Wallhead	19,511	60.1	1	ILP
Middlesbrough East	Martin Henry Connolly	7,712	33.9	2	Boilermakers
Middlesbrough West	J. D. White	7,413	30.6	2	
Middleton and Prestwich	Matthew Burrow Farr	7,849	28.7	3	Textile Factory Workers
Midlothian and Peebles Northern	Andrew Clarke	8,570	45.3	1	
Mile End	John Scurr	6,219	41.0	1	ILP
Mitcham	James Chuter Ede	9,877	47.7	2	
Montrose Burghs	John Carnegie	7,032	44.7	2	ILP
Morpeth	Robert Smillie	16,902	64.2	1	Miners
Neath	William Jenkins	20,764	62.3	1	Miners
Nelson and Colne	Arthur Greenwood	17,083	46.1	1	
Newcastle-under-Lyme	Josiah Wedgwood	12,881	65.6	1	ILP
Newcastle upon Tyne Central	Charles Trevelyan	12,447	52.5	1	ILP
Newcastle upon Tyne East	Arthur Henderson	11,532	47.7	2	
Newcastle upon Tyne North	John Beckett	5,374	22.0	3	ILP
Newcastle upon Tyne West	David Adams	11,527	43.2	2	Engineering
Newport	John William Bowen	14,100	38.6	2	Post Office Workers
Newton	Robert Young	12,492	59.9	1	Engineering
Normanton	Frederick Hall	15,453	78.0	1	Miners
North East Derbyshire	Frank Lee	10,971	39.5	1	Miners
North Lanarkshire	Joseph Sullivan	10,526	50.5	1	Miners
North Norfolk	Noel Noel-Buxton	12,278	57.6	1	
Northampton	Margaret Bondfield	15,556	40.5	1	General Workers
Northwich	John Williams	9,183	29.8	3	
Norwich	Dorothy Jewson	19,304	20.0	2	ILP
Norwich	Walter Smith	20,077	20.9	1	Boot & Shoe
Norwood	William Archer Hodgson	5,002	19.3	3	
Nottingham West	Arthur Hayday	12,366	62.7	1	General Workers
Nuneaton	Thomas Barron	10,437	29.1	3	Woodworkers
Ogmore	Vernon Hartshorn	unopposed	N/A	1	Miners
Oldham	William John Tout	20,939	23.4	1	Textile Factory Workers
Ormskirk	Robert Barrie Walker	9,388	47.0	2	
Oswestry	Sidney Ronald Campion	3,477	14.1	3	
Paddington North	John William Gordon	6,954	30.8	2	
Paisley	John McLaren Biggar	7,977	27.4	2	Co-op
Peckham	Walter Ashbridge Chambers	8,370	35.3	2	
Peebles and Southern Midlothian	Joseph Westwood	7,882	43.0	1	Miners
Pembrokeshire	William James Jenkins	9,511	27.7	3	
Penistone	Rennie Smith	8,329	33.5	2	ILP
Peterborough	John Mansfield	8,177	30.5	2	
Petersfield	Dudley Aman	6,403	34.4	2	
Plaistow	Will Thorne	13,638	74.6	1	General Workers
Plymouth Devonport	Joseph Harris	4,158	15.5	3	Workers
Plymouth Drake	James John Hamlyn Moses	11,849	41.9	2	
Plymouth Sutton	Frederick Woulfe-Brenan	13,438	45.5	2	
Pontefract	Tom Smith	11,134	45.3	1	Miners
Pontypool	Thomas Griffiths	13,770	50.6	1	Iron & Steel
Pontypridd	Thomas Mardy Jones	16,837	54.9	1	Miners
Poplar South	Samuel March	14,537	64.8	1	Transport & General Workers
Portsmouth Central	Frank Percy Crozier	7,991	26.9	3	
Portsmouth North	Olaf Gleeson	9,523	36.2	2	
Portsmouth South	Jessie Stephen	7,388	24.9	2	
Preston	Tom Shaw	25,816	34.4	1	Textile Factory Workers
Pudsey and Otley	Percy Myers	5,499	20.9	3	
Reading	Somerville Hastings	16,657	44.8	1	ILP
Rhondda East	David Watts-Morgan	21,338	71.9	1	Miners
Rhondda West	William John	18,206	65.4	1	Miners
Rochdale	Stanley Burgess	13,525	32.6	2	Engineering
Romford	Albert Emil Davies	9,109	33.9	2	
Rossendale	Norman Angell	9,230	30.6	3	
Rother Valley	Thomas Walter Grundy	15,967	68.6	1	Miners
Rotherham	Fred Lindley	16,983	53.9	1	Woodworkers
Rotherhithe	Ben Smith	9,019	48.0	1	Transport & General Workers
Rothwell	William Lunn	15,115	66.0	1	Miners
Roxburgh and Selkirk	George Dallas	6,811	26.1	3	Workers
Royton	James Barton Turner	2,740	09.2	3	
Rushcliffe	James Wilson	6,882	24.7	3	Railwaymen
Rutherglen	William Wright	13,021	54.5	1	ILP
Rutland and Stamford	Arthur Sells	5,005	23.8	3	
Saffron Walden	William Cash	6,398	29.3	2	
St Albans	Christopher Thomson	6,640	26.5	2	
St Helens	James Sexton	20,086	55.5	1	
St Ives	Albert Dunn	2,749	12.9	3	
St Marylebone	James Jonas Dodd	8,424	33.4	2	
St Pancras North	James Marley	10,931	43.0	1	ILP
St Pancras South East	Herbert Romeril	7,866	41.6	1	Railway Clerks
St Pancras South West	George Horne	5,321	31.4	2	
Salford North	Ben Tillett	13,377	51.1	1	Transport & General Workers
Salford South	Joseph Toole	12,097	46.0	1	Constituency
Salford West	Alexander Haycock	9,868	38.4	1	ILP
Seaham	Sidney Webb	21,281	71.3	1	
Sedgefield	John Herriotts	11,087	50.0	2	Miners
Sheffield Attercliffe	Cecil Wilson	13,581	58.7	1	ILP
Sheffield Brightside	Arthur Ponsonby	14,741	53.0	1	ILP
Sheffield Central	Tom Snowden	8,762	41.1	2	
Sheffield Hallam	Arnold Freeman	5,506	23.9	2	
Sheffield Hillsborough	A. V. Alexander	15,087	55.7	1	Co-op
Sheffield Park	George Lathan	9,050	39.4	2	Railway Clerks
Shipley	William Mackinder	11,918	38.4	1	Distributive Workers
Shoreditch	Ernest Thurtle	13,874	56.6	1	
Silvertown	Jack Jones	12,777	81.3	1	General Workers
Skipton	George Willey	7,767	24.5	3	
Smethwick	John Davison	13,550	54.7	1	
South Ayrshire	James Brown	11,169	55.9	1	Miners
South Derbyshire	Alfred Goodere	10,919	32.7	2	
South Dorset	David Wyndham Thomas	3,602	17.5	3	
South East Essex	Philip Hoffman	13,979	53.0	1	
South Norfolk	George Edwards	11,682	51.9	1	
South Shields	Will Lawther	15,717	40.7	2	Miners
South West Norfolk	William Benjamin Taylor	9,779	46.5	2	
Southampton	Reginald Sorensen	16,679	16.4	4	ILP
Southampton	Tommy Lewis	17,208	16.9	3	
Southwark Central	Harry Day	6,690	34.9	2	
Southwark North	Leslie Haden-Guest	7,665	51.2	1	
Southwark South East	Thomas Naylor	9,374	54.3	1	Compositors
Sowerby	Arthur Dawson	7,389	25.8	3	
Spelthorne	G. S. Cockrill	5,868	33.6	2	
Spen Valley	Tom Myers	12,597	37.4	2	Distributive Workers
Spennymoor	Joseph Batey	15,567	65.7	1	Miners
Stafford	William Thomas Scott	8,412	46.1	2	Distributive Workers
Stirling and Falkirk	Hugh Murnin	10,565	49.6	2	
Stockport	Arnold Townend	16,340	18.0	5	Railway Clerks
Stockton-on-Tees	Frederick Fox Riley	10,619	31.2	3	Post Office Workers
Stoke	John Watts	12,502	48.8	2	Miners
Stourbridge	Wilfred Wellock	9,050	24.4	3	ILP
Stratford West Ham	Thomas Groves	11466	55.1	1	
Stretford	John Corlett	11,451	41.8	2	
Sunderland	David Baxter Lawley	13,707	11.6	5	ILP
Sunderland	Thomas William Gillinder	13,184	11.1	6	
Swansea East	David Williams	12,735	57.4	1	ILP
Swansea West	Howel Samuel	9,260	34.8	1	
Swindon	Holford Knight	9,121	32.6	2	
The Wrekin	Henry Nixon	11657	53.2	1	
Tonbridge	Joseph Thomas Davis	6,610	23.6	3	
Tottenham North	Robert Morrison	12,696	49.7	1	Co-op
Tottenham South	Percy Alden	10,312	46.9	1	
Twickenham	Stanley Simon Sherman	5,509	23.7	2	
Tynemouth	W. Pitt	4,875	20.7	3	
Upton	Benjamin Walter Gardner	8,656	39.3	1	ILP
Uxbridge	Robert Small	6,146	26.9	3	
Wakefield	George Henry Sherwood	7,966	39.9	1	
Wallsend	Patrick Hastings	16,126	55.5	1	
Walsall	Arthur Carr Osburn	7,007	18.7	3	
Walthamstow East	John Gilbert Dale	6,837	34.6	2	ILP
Walthamstow West	Valentine McEntee	10,026	47.6	1	Woodworkers
Wandsworth Central	George Pearce Blizard	5,294	28.7	2	
Wansbeck	George Warne	18,583	56.8	1	Miners
Warrington	Charles Dukes	12,984	43.6	1	
Warwick and Leamington	Daisy Greville	4,015	12.8	3	
Watford	James Joseph Mallon	7,532	30.8	2	
Wednesbury	Alfred Short	17,810	51.5	1	Boilermakers
Wellingborough	William Cove	11,175	42.1	1	
Wells	Charles Henry Whitlow	1,713	07.6	3	ILP
Wentworth	George Henry Hirst	unopposed	N/A	1	Miners
West Bromwich	Frederick Roberts	12,910	44.8	1	
Westbury	George Ward	4,372	17.4	3	ILP
West Dorset	Louie Simpson	7,087	41.2	2	ILP
West Fife	William Adamson	12,204	65.4	1	Miners
Westhoughton	Rhys Davies	15,347	60.3	1	
West Renfrewshire	Robert Murray	10,904	48.1	1	ILP
West Stirlingshire	Tom Johnston	9,242	51.9	1	ILP
Whitechapel and St George's	Harry Gosling	7,812	54.0	1	
Whitehaven	Thomas Gavan-Duffy	12,419	53.0	1	
Widnes	Joe Cotter	12,020	44.2	2	
Wigan	John Allen Parkinson	19,637	57.6	1	Miners
Willesden East	Joseph George Butler	5,392	19.4	3	
Willesden West	Samuel Viant	14,004	51.3	1	Woodworkers
Wimbledon	Mark Starr	6,717	30.2	2	
Winchester	Reginald Stamp	6,495	27.1	2	
Wolverhampton West	William Brown	15,749	49.6	2	
Wood Green	James Bacon	5,665	17.2	3	
Woodbridge	E. J. C. Neep	4,810	21.1	3	
Woolwich East	Harry Snell	15,766	61.6	1	
Woolwich West	William Barefoot	11,357	47.8	2	
Worcester	Percy Williams	815	03.8	3	
Workington	Thomas Cape	15,296	56.5	1	Miners
Wrexham	Robert Richards	12,918	39.0	1	
Wycombe	George Young	3,611	11.4	3	
Yeovil	William Kelly	5,080	17.8	3	
York	Joseph King	11,626	34.2	2	

=== By-elections, 1923–1924 ===
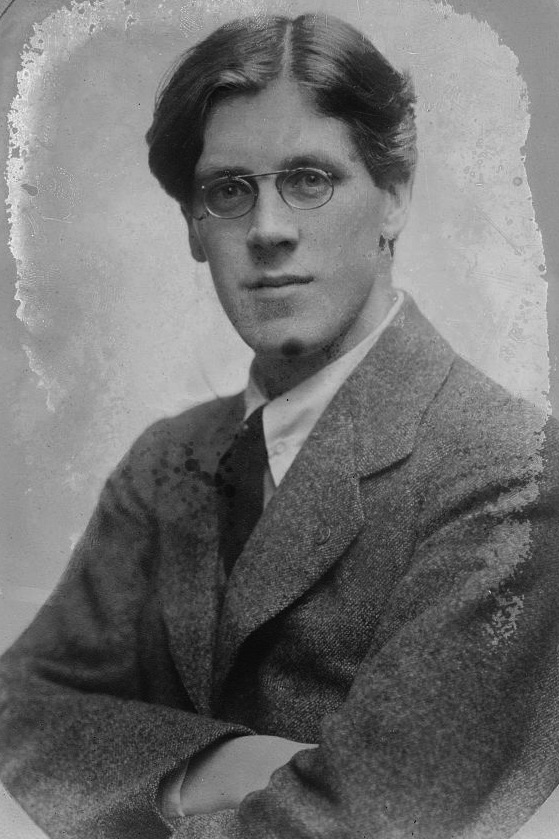
Fenner Brockway, who contested the 1924 Westminster Abbey by-election

By-election	Candidate	Votes	%	Position	Sponsor
1924 Burnley by-election	Arthur Henderson	24,571	58.4	1	
1924 Westminster Abbey by-election	Fenner Brockway	6,156	27.0	3	ILP
1924 Liverpool West Toxteth by-election	Joseph Gibbins	15,505	27.0	3	Boilermakers
1924 Glasgow Kelvingrove by-election	Aitken Ferguson	11,167	39.8	2	Boilermakers
1924 Oxford by-election	Kenneth Lindsay	2,769	13.1	3	
1924 Lewes by-election	Basil Hall	6,112	33.2	2	
1924 Holland with Boston by-election	Hugh Dalton	12,101	37.1	2	
1924 Carmarthen by-election	Edward Teilo Owen	8,351	28.8	2	

=== 1924 general election ===
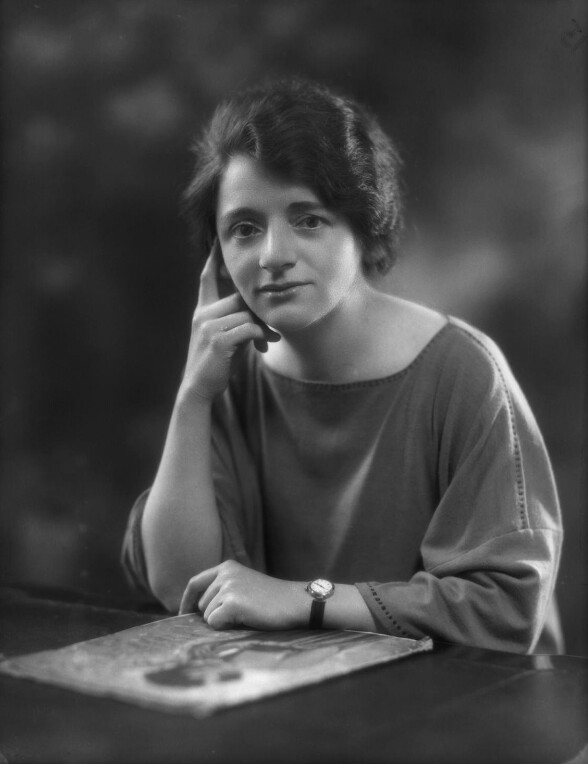
Ellen Wilkinson, newly elected in Middlesbrough East

Joseph Compton, winner in Manchester Gorton

Constituency	Candidate	Votes	%	Position	Sponsor
Aberavon	Ramsay MacDonald	17,724	53.1	1	ILP
Aberdare	George Hall	20,704	57.2	1	Miners
Aberdeen and Kincardine East	William Sloan Cormack	3,899	24.4	3	ILP
Aberdeen North	Frank Herbert Rose	13,249	60.8	1	ILP
Aberdeen South	George Archibald	10,699	39.9	2	ILP
Abertillery	George Barker	unopposed	N/A	1	Miners
Abingdon	D. F. Brundil	1,355	05.8	3	
Accrington	Charles Roden Buxton	18,148	47.1	2	ILP
Acton	Herbert Alphonsus Baldwin	5,583	24.0	2	
Aldershot	Hubert Beaumont	4,313	23.4	2	
Anglesey	Cyril O. Jones	7,580	36.1	2	
Argyllshire	I. H. MacIver	4,532	22.7	3	ILP
Ashford	Basil Noble	4,473	17.8	3	
Ashton-under-Lyne	Cecil L'Estrange Malone	7,451	32.8	2	
Aylesbury	Frederick Charles Watkins	2,655	08.2	3	
Ayr Burghs	John McDiarmid Airlie	9,787	37.7	2	
Balham and Tooting	Edward Archbold	5,536	21.5	3	
Banbury	Arthur Ernest Monks	4,733	16.5	3	
Banffshire	Alexander William Groundwater	3,722	23.3	3	
Barkston Ash	William Dobbie	11,894	41.4	2	Railwaymen
Barnard Castle	Moss Turner-Samuels	9,152	49.2	2	
Barnsley	John Potts	14,738	51.7	1	Miners
Barrow-in-Furness	John Bromley	15,512	51.2	1	Locomotive Engineers
Basingstoke	Ben Greene	2,172	08.0	3	
Bassetlaw	Malcolm MacDonald	11,283	41.0	2	
Bath	Walter Barton Scobell	3,914	13.6	3	
Batley and Morley	Ben Turner	15,966	49.4	2	
Battersea South	Albert Winfield	14,371	42.3	2	
Belper	Jack Lees	10,618	41.8	2	ILP
Bedford	George Dixon	5,330	18.5	3	
Bedwellty	Charles Edwards	unopposed	N/A	1	Miners
Bermondsey West	Alfred Salter	11,578	57.2	1	ILP
Berwick and Haddington	Robert Spence	8,882	34.7	2	
Berwick-upon-Tweed	James Adams	3,521	14.8	3	
Bethnal Green North East	Walter Windsor	9,560	50.2	1	General & Municipal Workers
Bilston	John Baker	14,583	53.2	1	Iron & Steel
Birkenhead East	James Coulthard	7,496	26.7	3	ILP
Birkenhead West	William Henry Egan	12,723	49.4	2	Boilermakers
Birmingham Aston	John Strachey	11,859	45.4	2	
Birmingham Deritend	Fred Longden	12,760	48.5	2	Co-op
Birmingham Duddeston	George Francis Sawyer	10,892	48.9	2	
Birmingham Edgbaston	F. R. Sharkey	5,744	23.4	2	
Birmingham Erdington	Charles Simmons	11,412	40.5	2	ILP
Birmingham Handsworth	Philip Noel-Baker	10,516	34.4	2	
Birmingham King's Norton	Robert Dennison	10,497	43.3	1	Iron & Steel
Birmingham Ladywood	Oswald Mosley	13,297	48.9	2	ILP
Birmingham Moseley	George Pearce Blizard	7,183	22.8	2	
Birmingham Sparkbrook	Sydney Potter	9,759	36.1	2	ILP
Birmingham Yardley	Archibald Gossling	14,184	46.8	2	Woodworkers
Bishop Auckland	Ben Spoor	15,786	55.1	1	ILP
Blackburn	Thomas Gill	24,317	21.8	4	Railway Clerks
Blackburn	Mary Hamilton	24,330	21.8	3	ILP
Blaydon	William Whiteley	17,670	62.6	1	Miners
Bolton	William Harold Hutchinson	28,918	19.8	4	
Bolton	Albert Law	30,632	20.9	3	Textile Factory Workers
Bootle	John Kinley	9,427	34.7	2	
Bosworth	John Minto	9,143	31.5	3	
Bothwell	John Robertson	14,591	56.3	1	Miners
Bournemouth	Minnie Pallister	7,735	27.3	2	Constituency
Bow and Bromley	George Lansbury	15,740	61.6	1	Constituency
Bradford Central	William Leach	16,652	48.3	2	ILP
Bradford East	Fred Jowett	15,174	49.9	2	ILP
Bradford North	Frank Wise	9,442	32.7	2	ILP
Bradford South	William Hirst	13,919	39.0	1	Co-op
Brecon and Radnor	Edward John	10,167	30.5	3	
Brentford and Chiswick	William Haywood	6,114	29.5	2	
Bridgwater	James Musgrave Boltz	1,966	07.3	3	
Brigg	David Quibell	11,669	43.6	2	ILP
Brighton	Alban Gordon	14,072	15.2	3	
Bristol Central	James Lovat-Fraser	14,018	44.9	2	
Bristol East	Walter Baker	16,920	58.2	1	Post Office Workers
Bristol North	Walter Ayles	12,319	40.9	2	ILP
Bristol South	David Vaughan	15,702	48.4	2	
Bristol West	Matt Giles	6,276	21.0	2	
Brixton	James Adams	7,210	25.9	2	
Bromley	Hubert Joseph Wallington	5,876	15.6	3	
Broxtowe	George Spencer	15,276	55.4	1	Miners
Buckingham	Edward J. Pay	8,939	30.6	2	Social Democratic
Burnley	Arthur Henderson	20,549	45.4	1	Foundry Workers
Burslem	Andrew MacLaren	14,361	51.1	1	Constituency
Burton	F. Thoresby	7,141	25.8	2	
Bury	Harry Wallace	10,286	36.1	2	Post Office Workers
Bute and Northern Ayrshire	Peter Campbell Stephen	10,075	38.3	2	ILP
Caernarvon Boroughs	Alfred Zimmern	3,401	17.5	2	
Caernarvonshire	Robert Jones	14,564	49.2	2	
Caerphilly	Morgan Jones	17,723	59.0	1	ILP
Camberwell North	Charles Ammon	11,300	54.9	1	Post Office Workers
Camberwell North West	Hyacinth Morgan	9,432	39.0	2	
Camborne	F. A. P. Rowe	5,477	24.6	3	
Cambridge	Alec Firth	6,744	28.1	2	
Cambridgeshire	Geoffrey Garratt	10,781	41.0	2	
Cannock	William Adamson	16,347	51.9	1	Workers
Cardiff Central	David Pole	9,864	33.8	2	
Cardiff East	Harold Lloyd	8,156	32.8	2	
Cardiff South	Arthur Henderson Jr	9,324	40.3	2	
Carlisle	George Middleton	10,676	45.5	2	Post Office Workers
Carmarthen	Edward Teilo Owen	7,953	31.5	2	
Central Aberdeenshire	J. Newman	3,791	18.4	2	ILP
Chatham	William Harvey Moore	9,276	36.7	2	
Chelmsford	Nils Henry Moller	2,904	10.0	3	
Chelsea	Dora Russell	5,661	26.0	2	Constituency
Chester	George Beardsworth	5,451	23.2	3	
Chesterfield	George Benson	9,206	39.7	2	ILP
Chester-le-Street	Jack Lawson	22,700	71.0	1	Miners
Chichester	Richard Henry Kennard Hope	1,765	05.1	3	
Chislehurst	John Lamb Thomson	3,757	17.2	2	
Chorley	Zeph Hutchinson	13,074	42.3	2	Textile Factory Workers
Cirencester and Tewkesbury	Joseph Alpass	7,078	28.0	2	
Clackmannan and Eastern Stirlingshire	Lauchlin MacNeill Weir	13,032	52.6	1	ILP
Clapham	Charles Diamond	9,204	35.9	2	
Clay Cross	Charles Duncan	14,618	64.4	1	Workers
Cleveland	William Mansfield	11,153	29.4	2	Miners
Clitheroe	Derwent Hall Caine	14,041	45.8	2	
Coatbridge	James C. Welsh	12,782	50.1	1	Constituency
Colchester	Richard Reiss	10,953	43.4	2	ILP
Colne Valley	Philip Snowden	14,215	43.3	1	Constituency
Combined English Universities	Joseph Findlay	861	19.5	2	University Party
Combined Scottish Universities	John Martin Munro	1,639	09.3	4	University Party
Consett	Herbert Dunnico	18,842	55.9	1	ILP
Coventry	A. A. Purcell	17,888	33.4	2	
Crewe	Edward Hemmerde	14,705	44.5	2	
Croydon North	Gilbert Foan	10,954	29.7	2	ILP
Croydon South	H. T. Muggeridge	12,979	35.4	2	
Darlington	Arthur Shepherd	13,008	46.2	2	Constituency
Dartford	John Edmund Mills	19,352	49.0	2	
Darwen	Thomas Ramsden	5,188	17.1	3	
Derby	William Robert Raynes	25,172	23.6	3	
Derby	J. H. Thomas	27,423	25.7	1	Railwaymen
Deptford	C. W. Bowerman	21,903	54.5	1	Compositors
Dewsbury	Benjamin Riley	9,941	41.1	1	ILP
Doncaster	Wilfred Paling	16,496	52.7	1	Miners
Don Valley	Tom Williams	14,958	53.9	1	Miners
Dover	A. F. George	7,627	26.5	2	
Dudley	Oliver Baldwin	10,314	47.9	2	
Dulwich	C. A. Smith	7,068	26.5	2	
Dumbarton Burghs	David Kirkwood	14,562	59.2	1	Engineering
Dumfriesshire	Agnes Dollan	6,342	23.0	3	ILP
Dunbartonshire	William Martin	12,872	44.2	2	ILP
Dundee	E. D. Morel	32,846	26.5	1	
Dunfermline Burghs	William McLean Watson	13,887	57.9	1	Miners
Durham	Joshua Ritson	15,032	54.9	1	Miners
Ealing	Alfred Chilton	6,765	26.7	2	
Eastbourne	D. J. Davis	4,138	16.0	3	
East Dorset	Edward Joseph Stocker	4,205	15.3	3	
East Grinstead	John Morgan	4,479	15.7	3	
East Ham North	Susan Lawrence	10,137	35.8	2	Constituency
East Ham South	Alfred Barnes	13,644	51.9	1	Co-op
East Norfolk	Reginald Barrington Bates	4,907	19.4	3	
East Renfrewshire	Robert Nichol	10,903	44.3	2	ILP
East Surrey	Robert Oscar Mennell	5,152	16.0	3	
Ebbw Vale	Evan Davies	unopposed	N/A	1	Miners
Eccles	John Buckle	14,354	51.4	1	Boot & Shoe
Edinburgh Central	William Graham	13,628	60.5	1	ILP
Edinburgh East	Drummond Shiels	8,460	41.9	1	Constituency
Edinburgh North	Eleanor Stewart	8,192	27.9	2	Workers
Edinburgh West	George Mathers	9,603	33.1	2	Railway Clerks
Edmonton	Frank Broad	11,614	53.1	1	Engineering
Elland	William C. Robinson	11,690	39.5	1	Textile Factory Workers
Enfield	William Henderson	11,807	46.0	2	
Epping	J. R. McPhie	3,768	11.2	3	
Epsom	Philip Butler	5,149	20.5	2	
Evesham	Robert Aldington	3,473	17.3	2	
Exeter	A. J. Penny	6,359	25.2	2	
Eye	Charles Wye Kendall	4,329	17.2	3	
Fareham	Joseph Bowron Baker	6,304	24.8	2	
Farnham	Anne Corner	4,613	20.2	2	Constituency
Farnworth	Thomas Greenall	15,327	47.5	1	Miners
Faversham	Stanley Morgan	9,180	29.9	2	
Finsbury	George Gillett	12,363	47.0	1	Constituency
Flintshire	David Gwynfryn Jones	7,821	19.1	3	
Forest of Dean	James Wignall	11,048	53.1	1	
Forfarshire	Charles Gallie	3,736	22.9	3	Railway Clerks
Frome	Frederick Gould	14,652	47.2	2	
Fulham East	John Palmer	10,403	38.4	2	
Fulham West	Robert Mark Gentry	11,706	40.6	2	
Gainsborough	F. J. Knowles	5,958	27.3	2	
Gateshead	John Beckett	23,514	50.2	1	ILP
Gillingham	Maurice Spencer	8,309	35.3	2	
Glasgow Bridgeton	James Maxton	16,850	61.3	1	ILP
Glasgow Camlachie	Campbell Stephen	14,588	50.4	1	ILP
Glasgow Cathcart	John Primrose Hay	9,915	35.0	2	ILP
Glasgow Central	J. D. White	12,617	40.9	2	ILP
Glasgow Gorbals	George Buchanan	19,480	65.9	1	Patternmakers
Glasgow Govan	Neil Maclean	15,132	63.2	1	ILP
Glasgow Hillhead	John L. Kinloch	6,957	32.3	2	ILP
Glasgow Maryhill	John William Muir	13,947	47.4	2	ILP
Glasgow Kelvingrove	Thomas Archibald Kerr	12,844	41.6	2	ILP
Glasgow Partick	Andrew Young	9,612	42.2	2	Co-op
Glasgow Pollok	John Rankin	6,749	24.7	2	ILP
Glasgow St Rollox	James Stewart	16,299	59.2	1	ILP
Glasgow Shettleston	John Wheatley	12,714	51.3	1	ILP
Glasgow Springburn	George Hardie	15,635	56.5	1	ILP
Glasgow Tradeston	Thomas Henderson	14,067	56.0	1	Co-op
Gloucester	M. Philips Price	8,005	36.2	2	ILP
Gower	David Rhys Grenfell	15,374	57.2	1	Miners
Grantham	Montangue William Moore	7,279	24.5	3	
Gravesend	George Isaacs	10,969	41.6	2	Printers
Great Yarmouth	T. G. Tyler	3,264	14.4	3	
Greenock	Stephen Kelly	5,874	22.4	3	ILP
Greenwich	Edward Timothy Palmer	17,409	48.5	2	Prudential Staff
Grimsby	Charles Edwin Franklin	14,874	35.6	2	
Guildford	Frank Markham	6,227	21.2	2	
Hackney Central	Ernest E. Hunter	9,684	36.3	2	ILP
Hackney North	Stella Churchill	6,097	24.1	3	Constituency
Hackney South	Herbert Morrison	11,651	46.5	2	
Hamilton	Duncan Macgregor Graham	13,003	60.8	1	Miners
Hammersmith North	James Patrick Gardner	10,970	45.9	2	ILP
Hammersmith South	Christopher Addison	8,804	38.5	2	
Hampstead	Charles Terry Hendin	5,662	20.9	2	
Hanley	Samuel Clowes	13,527	53.0	1	Pottery Workers
Harborough	J. S. Hyder	6,032	24.3	2	
Harrow	Kenneth Lindsay	9,507	31.3	2	
Harwich	Alf Barton	1,604	06.8	3	ILP
Hastings	Muriel Matters Porter	6,082	28.6	2	Constituency
Hemel Hempstead	Amy Sayle	1,553	06.9	3	Constituency
Hemsworth	John Guest	15,593	69.3	1	Miners
Hendon	J. Allen Skinner	5,267	17.5	3	
Hertford	Ernest Selley	3,885	16.0	3	
Hexham	Charles Flynn	5,089	22.7	3	
Heywood and Radcliffe	Alexander Walkden	15,307	44.4	2	Railway Clerks
Hitchin	Julian Athelstan Tayler	5,773	24.4	2	
Holborn	W. W. Messer	3,718	24.5	2	
Holland with Boston	G. R. Blanco White	10,689	32.8	2	
Hornsey	Christopher Francis Healy	4,277	11.1	3	
Horsham and Worthing	Ernest Stanford	7,537	24.1	2	
Houghton-le-Spring	Robert Richardson	17,857	57.8	1	Miners
Huddersfield	James Hudson	19,010	36.3	1	ILP
Hythe	Constantine Gallop	3,936	23.5	2	
Ilford	Dan Chater	8,460	21.7	2	
Ilkeston	George Oliver	11,011	44.9	1	Workers
Ince	Stephen Walsh	18,272	70.0	1	Miners
Inverness	T. Henderson	6,863	37.4	2	ILP
Ipswich	Robert Jackson	15,791	44.6	2	ILP
Isle of Ely	Dermot Freyer	4,235	14.6	3	
Isle of Thanet	Dudley Aman	4,202	13.1	3	
Isle of Wight	Henry Edward Weaver	3,620	09.8	3	
Islington East	Ethel Bentham	10,280	32.3	2	Constituency
Islington North	Ewart Culpin	12,376	35.3	2	
Islington South	William Sampson Cluse	10,347	42.8	1	Social Democratic
Islington West	Frederick Montague	10,174	45.3	1	Social Democratic
Jarrow	Robert John Wilson	18,203	57.4	1	Distributive Workers
Keighley	Hastings Lees-Smith	14,105	45.0	1	ILP
Kennington	Thomas Williams	11,572	43.7	2	
Kensington North	Fielding West	14,401	47.0	2	
Kettering	Samuel Perry	14,801	49.6	2	Co-op
Kidderminster	J. Clifford Leigh	6,792	22.3	2	
Kilmarnock	Robert Climie	13,054	47.8	2	ILP
King's Lynn	John Stevenson	7,280	25.8	3	
Kingston upon Hull East	George Muff	11,130	38.4	2	
Kingston upon Hull North West	F. L. Kerran	5,151	18.2	3	
Kingston upon Hull South West	John Arnott	7,965	29.2	3	ILP
Kingston-upon-Thames	Arthur Balfour Bishop	5,640	19.8	2	
Kingswinford	Charles Henry Sitch	17,235	51.5	1	Chain Makers
Kinross and Western Perthshire	John MacDiarmid	5,286	28.0	2	ILP
Kirkcaldy Burghs	Tom Kennedy	14,038	52.7	1	Social Democratic
Lambeth North	George Strauss	7,914	37.1	2	
Lanark	Thomas Scott Dickson	11,426	43.5	2	ILP
Lancaster	Harold Mostyn Watkins	5,572	17.5	3	ILP
Leeds Central	E. J. C. Neep	10,975	40.4	2	
Leeds North East	Edna Penny	8,894	31.6	2	Co-op
Leeds North	Sam Crowther Moore	7,920	30.0	2	
Leeds South East	Henry Slesser	15,133	58.6	1	Constituency
Leeds South	Henry Charleton	12,799	46.3	1	Railwaymen
Leeds West	Thomas Stamford	13,057	42.5	1	ILP
Leek	William Bromfield	14,256	51.7	1	Midland Textile
Leicester East	George Banton	15,669	49.3	2	ILP
Leicester South	Herbert Brough Usher	8,912	29.7	2	
Leicester West	Frederick Pethick-Lawrence	16,047	51.2	1	Constituency
Leigh	Joe Tinker	17,262	51.5	1	Miners
Leith	Robert Freeman Wilson	11,250	40.4	2	
Lewes	Basil Hall	5,043	27.3	2	
Lewisham East	John Wilmot	13,621	31.4	2	
Lewisham West	Barbara Drake	6,781	20.4	2	Constituency
Leyton East	Archibald Church	9,087	39.7	2	
Leyton West	Alfred Smith	9,809	34.7	2	
Lichfield	Frank Hodges	12,512	46.2	2	Miners
Limehouse	Clement Attlee	11,713	57.7	1	ILP
Lincoln	Robert Arthur Taylor	11,596	41.3	1	Constituency
Linlithgowshire	Manny Shinwell	14,123	48.9	2	ILP
Liverpool East Toxteth	Charles Burden	6,620	24.6	2	
Liverpool Edge Hill	Jack Hayes	14,168	53.0	1	Constituency
Liverpool Everton	Henry Walker	10,075	48.5	2	
Liverpool Fairfield	Mary Mercer	8,412	37.1	2	ILP
Liverpool Kirkdale	Elijah Sandham	9,369	39.4	2	ILP
Liverpool Walton	Tom Gillinder	8,924	36.8	2	
Liverpool Wavertree	William Albert Robinson	10,383	35.0	2	Distributive Workers
Liverpool West Derby	Thomas Gallon Adams	8,807	29.6	2	
Liverpool West Toxteth	Joseph Gibbins	15,542	50.6	1	Constituency
Llandaff and Barry	Charles Lloyd	11,609	34.3	2	
Llanelly	John Henry Williams	20,516	52.9	1	Constituency
London University	Frank Bushnell	1,087	12.6	4	University Party
Loughborough	Ernest Winterton	9,751	34.9	2	
Lowestoft	Robert Arthur Mellanby	6,570	24.8	2	
Luton	Philip L. Millwood	5,850	17.8	3	
Macclesfield	John Williams	10,187	30.1	2	
Maidstone	Seymour Cocks	8,192	33.7	2	ILP
Maldon	Valentine Crittall	9,323	36.9	2	
Manchester Ardwick	Thomas Lowth	15,941	54.9	1	Railwaymen
Manchester Blackley	Wilfrid Burke	6,195	27.5	3	Distributive Workers
Manchester Clayton	John Edward Sutton	17,338	54.2	1	Miners
Manchester Gorton	Joseph Compton	16,383	56.0	1	Vehicle Workers
Manchester Hulme	Andrew McElwee	13,070	41.2	2	Woodworkers
Manchester Platting	J. R. Clynes	17,233	49.2	1	General & Municipal Workers
Manchester Withington	Edgar Whiteley	2,467	09.2	3	Constituency
Mansfield	Frank Varley	19,441	59.0	1	Miners
Merioneth	John Jones Roberts	6,393	33.1	2	
Merthyr	R. C. Wallhead	19,882	59.8	1	ILP
Middlesbrough East	Ellen Wilkinson	9,574	38.5	1	Distributive Workers
Middleton and Prestwich	Matthew Burrow Farr	8,442	27.0	2	Textile Factory Workers
Midlothian and Peebles Northern	Andrew Clarke	9,173	44.8	2	
Mile End	John Scurr	8,306	48.5	1	ILP
Mitcham	James Chuter Ede	9,776	38.0	2	
Monmouth	Luke Bateman	6,469	28.2	2	
Montgomeryshire	Arthur Davies	4,384	22.7	2	
Montrose Burghs	Thomas Barron	6,914	42.8	2	Woodworkers
Moray and Nairn	Skene Mackay	6,005	38.1	2	
Morpeth	Robert Smillie	19,248	56.8	1	Miners
Mossley	Thomas William Mercer	10,767	34.3	2	Co-op
Motherwell	James Barr	12,816	52.1	1	ILP
Neath	William Jenkins	unopposed	N/A	1	Miners
Nelson and Colne	Arthur Greenwood	19,922	51.9	1	Constituency
New Forest and Christchurch	C. Lincoln Brighton	3,137	11.3	3	
Newark	H. Varley	5,076	21.8	2	
Newbury	Frank Jacques	1,219	04.6	3	Constituency
Newcastle-under-Lyme	Josiah Wedgwood	14,226	57.7	1	Constituency
Newcastle-upon-Tyne Central	Charles Trevelyan	14,542	51.6	1	ILP
Newcastle upon Tyne East	Martin Henry Connolly	13,120	46.4	1	Boilermakers
Newcastle-upon-Tyne North	Herbert Maw	6,991	27.5	2	
Newcastle upon Tyne West	John Palin	13,089	45.5	1	Transport & General Workers
Newport	John William Bowen	18,263	47.2	2	Post Office Workers
Newton	Robert Young	12,875	56.1	1	Engineering
Normanton	Frederick Hall	unopposed	N/A	1	Miners
Northampton	Margaret Bondfield	15,046	37.2	2	General & Municipal Workers
North Cumberland	B. Brooke	2,125	10.9	3	
North East Derbyshire	Frank Lee	13,420	44.9	1	Miners
North Lanarkshire	Joseph Sullivan	11,852	46.1	2	Miners
North Norfolk	Noel Buxton	11,978	48.7	1	Constituency
Northwich	Barbara Ayrton-Gould	11,630	34.6	2	Constituency
Norwich	Dorothy Jewson	22,931	22.0	4	ILP
Norwich	Walter Smith	23,808	22.9	3	Boot & Shoe
Norwood	George James Anstey	8,927	28.7	2	
Nottingham Central	William Henderson Coultate	6,852	26.0	2	
Nottingham South	Henry Mills	8,897	39.3	2	
Nottingham West	Arthur Hayday	12,782	56.6	1	General & Municipal Workers
Nuneaton	Frank Smith	12,679	31.3	2	
Ogmore	Vernon Hartshorn	unopposed	N/A	1	Miners
Oldham	William Tout	23,623	19.7	3	Textile Factory Workers
Oldham	James Wilson	22,081	18.4	4	Railwaymen
Ormskirk	Robert Barrie Walker	10,402	43.7	2	
Oswestry	Thomas Morris	5,503	21.2	3	
Oxford	Frederic Ludlow	2,260	10.6	3	
Paddington North	John William Gordon	10,481	38.1	2	Railwaymen
Paisley	Edward Mitchell	17,057	53.5	1	ILP
Peckham	Hugh Dalton	13,361	46.1	1	Constituency
Peebles and Southern Midlothian	Joseph Westwood	7,797	40.8	1	Miners
Pembrokeshire	William James Jenkins	8,455	23.4	3	
Penistone	Rennie Smith	10,997	38.5	1	Constituency
Penrith and Cockermouth	Fred Tait	5,404	32.1	2	ILP
Penryn and Falmouth	Frederick Jesse Hopkins	6,462	22.4	3	
Perth	Cameron Roberts	5,316	20.2	3	ILP
Peterborough	John Mansfield	9,180	32.6	2	
Petersfield	George Gilbert Desmond	2,582	12.3	3	
Plaistow	Will Thorne	15,609	67.1	1	General & Municipal Workers
Plymouth Devonport	Holford Knight	6,350	22.7	3	
Plymouth Drake	James John Hamlyn Moses	12,161	39.9	2	
Plymouth Sutton	Frederick Woulfe-Brenan	13,095	41.9	2	
Pontefract	Tom Smith	13,044	48.7	2	Miners
Pontypool	Thomas Griffiths	15,378	52.6	1	Iron & Steel
Pontypridd	Thomas Mardy-Jones	18,301	55.9	1	Miners
Poplar South	Samuel March	16,224	62.6	1	Transport & General Workers
Portsmouth Central	Glenvil Hall	10,525	34.5	2	
Portsmouth North	Olaf Gleeson	10,279	36.9	2	
Portsmouth South	Jessie Stephen	8,310	27.0	2	Constituency
Preston	Tom Shaw	27,009	26.3	1	Textile Factory Workers
Pudsey and Otley	Percy Myers	7,001	25.3	2	
Putney	John Allen	6,609	27.6	2	
Reading	Somerville Hastings	18,337	46.2	2	
Reigate	William Graham	6,061	23.4	2	
Rhondda East	David Watts-Morgan	unopposed	N/A	1	Miners
Rhondda West	William John	unopposed	N/A	1	Miners
Richmond (Surrey)	Herbert Parker	6,034	23.2	2	
Rochdale	William Kelly	14,609	33.8	1	Workers
Romford	Emil Davies	13,312	38.3	2	
Rossendale	James Bell	9,951	32.4	2	Textile Factory Workers
Rotherham	Fred Lindley	18,860	54.6	1	Woodworkers
Rotherhithe	Ben Smith	12,703	60.3	1	Transport & General Workers
Rother Valley	Thomas Walter Grundy	18,750	65.3	1	Miners
Rothwell	William Lunn	16,540	61.8	1	Miners
Roxburgh and Selkirk	George Dallas	7,266	26.2	3	
Royton	Albert E. Wood	6,156	19.6	3	
Rugby	H. Yates	3,768	13.1	3	
Rushcliffe	J. O. Whitwham	9,548	35.0	2	
Rutherglen	William Wright	13,796	52.1	1	ILP
Rutland and Stamford	H. F. Wheeler	6,633	33.3	2	
Saffron Walden	William Cash	6,340	26.6	2	
St Albans	Frank Herbert	8,862	32.5	2	
St Helens	James Sexton	21,313	55.8	1	Transport & General Workers
St Marylebone	George Edward Elmer	8,782	26.5	2	
St Pancras North	James Marley	13,171	44.1	2	ILP
St Pancras South East	Herbert Romeril	10,463	45.5	2	Railway Clerks
St Pancras South West	Ernest Bennett	8,630	42.1	2	
Salford North	Ben Tillett	13,114	42.1	2	Transport & General Workers
Salford South	Joseph Toole	14,455	48.8	2	Constituency
Salford West	Alexander Haycock	12,369	42.5	2	ILP
Salisbury	David Freeman	2,071	08.1	3	
Scarborough and Whitby	Howard Doncaster Rowntree	2,713	08.3	3	
Seaham	Sidney Webb	22,399	65.5	1	Fabian
Sedgefield	John Herriotts	12,552	47.3	2	Miners
Sheffield Attercliffe	Cecil Wilson	16,802	63.6	1	ILP
Sheffield Brightside	Arthur Ponsonby	17,053	55.4	1	ILP
Sheffield Central	Tom Snowden	12,955	49.4	2	
Sheffield Hallam	Edward Snelgrove	8,807	36.3	2	
Sheffield Hillsborough	A. V. Alexander	16,573	56.9	1	Co-op
Sheffield Park	George Lathan	11,576	45.2	2	Railway Clerks
Shipley	William Mackinder	11,862	36.0	1	Distributive Workers
Shoreditch	Ernest Thurtle	16,608	53.0	1	Constituency
Shrewsbury	David Baxter Lawley	1,614	06.8	3	
Silvertown	Jack Jones	15,962	81.1	1	General & Municipal Workers
Skipton	George Willey	8,626	26.5	3	
Smethwick	John Davison	14,491	52.3	1	Constituency
Southampton	Tommy Lewis	22,183	21.1	3	
Southampton	Reginald Sorensen	21,768	20.8	4	
South Ayrshire	James Brown	11,313	50.4	1	Miners
South Derbyshire	Alfred Goodere	15,033	40.5	2	
South Dorset	W. Ridson	5,821	29.5	2	
South East Essex	Philip Hoffman	13,820	41.2	2	
Southend	Sydney Alexander Moseley	3,144	08.4	3	
South Norfolk	George Edwards	11,376	44.5	2	
South Shields	William Lawther	16,852	42.1	2	Miners
Southwark Central	Harry Day	9,199	40.0	1	Constituency
Southwark North	Leslie Haden-Guest	8,115	43.8	1	
Southwark South East	Thomas Naylor	11,635	54.3	1	Compositors
South West Norfolk	W. B. Taylor	10,004	42.0	2	
Sowerby	Arthur Dawson	8,881	30.1	3	
Spelthorne	Frederick Wilson Temple	7,792	30.6	2	
Spen Valley	Tom Myers	13,999	43.1	2	
Spennymoor	Joseph Batey	17,211	63.0	1	Miners
Stafford	William Thomas Scott	7,571	37.9	2	
Stalybridge and Hyde	Walter Fowden	12,509	33.7	2	ILP
Stirling and Clackmannan Western	Tom Johnston	9,749	49.3	2	ILP
Stirling and Falkirk	Hugh Murnin	13,436	53.9	1	Scottish Miners
Stockport	Arnold Townend	21,986	24.8	3	Railway Clerks
Stockton-on-Tees	Frederick Fox Riley	11,948	33.1	2	Post Office Workers
Stoke Newington	Lewis Silkin	3,420	18.1	3	
Stoke	John Watts	13,318	42.7	2	Miners
Stone	C. A. Brook	4,245	18.9	3	
Stourbridge	Wilfred Wellock	14,113	34.8	2	ILP
Stratford	Thomas Groves	13,264	56.0	1	Constituency
Stretford	Joseph Robinson	11,520	35.6	2	
Stroud	Edith Picton-Turbervill	7,418	25.2	2	Constituency
Sunderland	Jeremiah McVeagh	21,823	19.3	3	
Swansea East	David Williams	12,274	54.6	1	Constituency
Swansea West	Howel Samuel	9,188	33.4	2	
Swindon	R. H. Tawney	12,698	44.9	2	
Taunton	George Woods	2,441	09.1	3	
The Hartlepools	Craigie Aitchison	3,717	09.7	3	
The Wrekin	Henry Nixon	11,132	44.4	2	
Thornbury	Godfrey Elton	6,376	21.9	3	
Tonbridge	W. F. Toynbee	6,564	22.0	2	
Torquay	Arthur Moyle	2,752	08.4	3	
Totnes	Kate Spurrell	2,240	06.1	3	Constituency
Tottenham North	Robert Morrison	13,800	51.0	1	Co-op
Tottenham South	Percy Alden	12,099	47.1	2	
Twickenham	Stanley Simon Sherman	7,945	29.6	2	
Tynemouth	John Stuart Barr	6,818	27.4	3	
University of Wales	George Davies	721	40.6	2	University Party
Upton	Benjamin Gardner	11,443	46.0	2	ILP
Uxbridge	Robert Small	8,459	32.6	2	
Wakefield	George Sherwood	10,192	47.9	2	Railwaymen
Wallasey	John H. Warren	8,634	27.6	2	
Wallsend	Patrick Hastings	17,274	52.4	1	
Walsall	Lothian Small	11,474	28.7	3	
Walthamstow East	John Gilbert Dale	8,246	35.4	2	
Walthamstow West	Valentine McEntee	12,621	49.1	2	Woodworkers
Wandsworth Central	Charles Latham	8,235	38.4	2	
Wansbeck	George Warne	21,159	52.9	1	Miners
Warrington	Charles Dukes	15,251	47.6	2	
Waterloo	George Frank Titt	6,116	28.0	2	
Watford	Herbert Elvin	7,417	26.6	2	
Wednesbury	Alfred Short	18,170	50.5	1	Boilermakers
Wellingborough	William Cove	11,381	40.0	1	Constituency
Wells	Wilfred Thomas Young	2,726	11.3	3	
Wentworth	George Hirst	unopposed	N/A	1	Miners
West Bromwich	Frederick Roberts	15,384	51.6	1	Typographical
Westbury	George Ward	4,731	18.1	3	ILP
West Dorset	Louie Simpson	5,764	31.7	2	Constituency
Western Isles	A. G. Burns	1,454	17.2	3	ILP
West Fife	William Adamson	14,685	70.9	1	Miners
Westhoughton	Rhys Davies	16,033	55.8	1	Distributive Workers
Westminster Abbey	Arthur Woolf	4,308	19.4	2	
Westmorland	Reginald Penrith Burnett	7,242	28.2	2	
Weston-super-Mare	Raphael Neft	1,343	04.2	3	ILP
West Renfrewshire	Robert Murray	11,252	45.9	2	ILP
Whitechapel and St George's	Harry Gosling	10,147	58.5	1	Transport & General Workers
Whitehaven	Thomas Gavan-Duffy	11,741	47.2	2	Cumberland Iron Ore
Widnes	Joe Cotter	13,326	46.3	2	
Wigan	John Parkinson	20,350	57.6	1	Miners
Willesden East	William Davies Lloyd	7,860	24.7	3	ILP
Willesden West	Samuel Viant	14,884	47.3	1	Woodworkers
Wimbledon	Mark Starr	7,386	25.8	2	
Winchester	Reginald Stamp	8,216	31.3	2	
Windsor	C. N. B. Crisp	5,514	21.3	2	
Wolverhampton East	D. Rowland Williams	5,188	19.8	3	
Wolverhampton West	William Brown	17,046	48.8	2	
Wood Green	Harri Tudor Rhys	8,648	23.0	2	
Woodbridge	Sylvain Mayer	3,998	16.4	3	
Woolwich East	Harry Snell	16,660	58.4	1	Constituency
Woolwich West	William Barefoot	12,304	42.7	2	
Worcester	Percy Williams	3,272	15.3	3	
Workington	Thomas Cape	15,353	55.6	1	Miners
Wrexham	Robert Richards	15,291	44.4	2	
Wycombe	George Young	4,626	12.2	3	
Yeovil	James Lievsley George	6,179	20.6	3	
York	David Adams	15,500	43.8	2	

=== By-elections, 1924–1929 ===
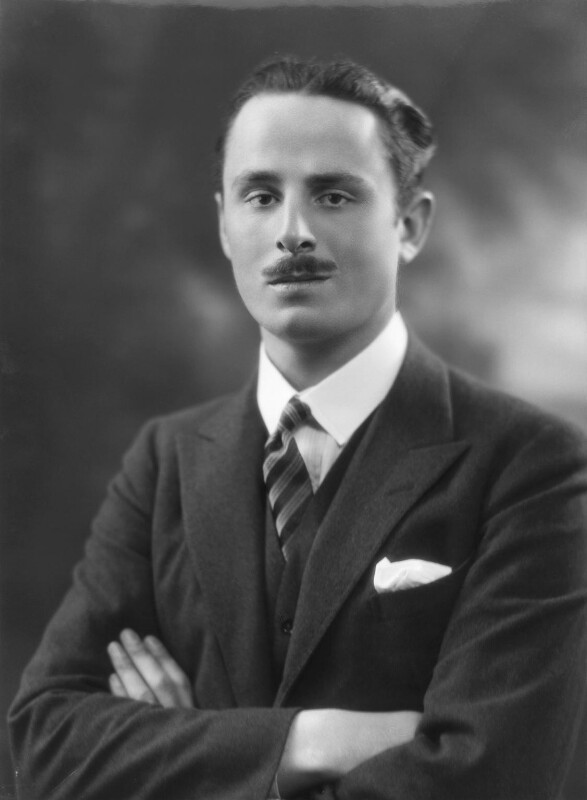
Oswald Mosley, victor in the 1926 Smethwick by-election

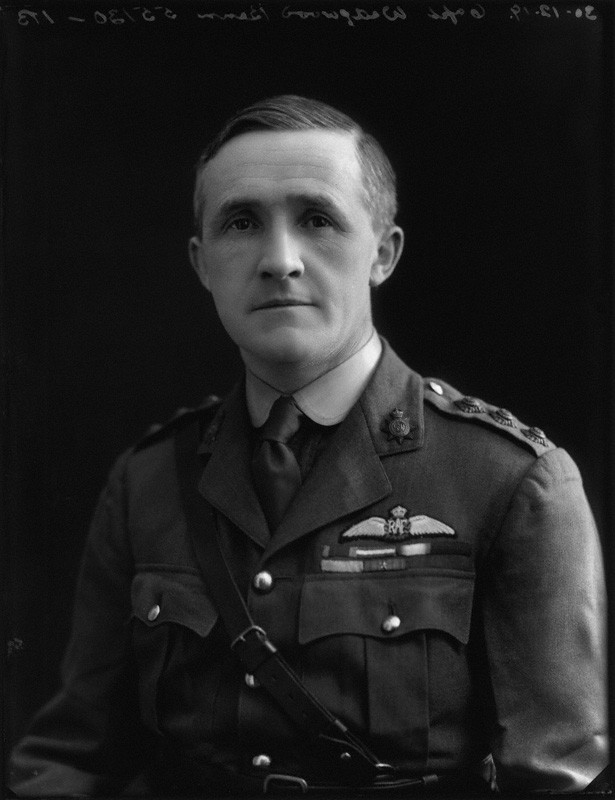
William Wedgwood Benn, victor in the 1928 Aberdeen North by-election

By-election	Candidate	Votes	%	Position	Sponsor
1924 Dundee by-election	Tom Johnston	22,973	69.2	1	ILP
1925 Walsall by-election	Lothian Small	11,610	30.0	3	Constituency
1925 Ayr Burghs by-election	Patrick Dollan	9,787	35.2	2	ILP
1925 Eastbourne by-election	Thomas Williams	3,696	16.9	3	
1925 Oldham by-election	William John Tout	21,702	45.2	2	Textile Factory Workers
1925 Forest of Dean by-election	A. A. Purcell	11,629	48.5	1	Furnishing Trades
1925 Stockport by-election	Arnold Townend	20,219	36.5	1	Railway Clerks
1925 Galloway by-election	John Mitchell	4,207	16.8	3	
1926 Dunbartonshire by-election	William Henry Porteous Martin	11,610	43.9	2	
1926 East Renfrewshire by-election	John Martin Munro	10,889	48.0	2	
1926 Darlington by-election	Arthur Shepherd	12,965	44.5	1	
1926 Bothwell by-election	Joseph Sullivan	14,830	59.7	1	
1926 East Ham North by-election	Susan Lawrence	10,798	40.7	1	
1926 Buckrose by-election	Herbert Cecil Laycock	2,191	8.8	3	
1926 Hammersmith North by-election	James Patrick Gardner	13,095	53.4	1	
1926 Wallsend by-election	Margaret Bondfield	18,866	57.7	1	General & Municipal Workers
1926 North Cumberland by-election	H. W. McIntyre	2,793	15.1	3	Constituency
1926 Howdenshire by-election	John Kneeshaw	2,318	11.8	2	Constituency
1926 Kingston upon Hull Central by-election	Joseph Kenworthy	16,145	52.9	1	
1926 Chelmsford by-election	Nils H. Moller	6,140	22.0	3	Constituency
1926 Smethwick by-election	Oswald Mosley	16,077	57.1	1	Constituency
1927 Stourbridge by-election	Wilfred Wellock	16,561	41.9	1	Constituency
1927 Leith by-election	Robert Freeman Wilson	12,350	42.0	2	Constituency
1927 Southwark North by-election	George Isaacs	6,167	36.9	2	Printers' Assistants
1927 Combined Scottish Universities by-election	Hugh Guthrie	2,378	12.3	2	University Party
1927 Bosworth by-election	John Minto	11,710	37.3	2	
1927 Westbury by-election	George Ward	5,396	20.4	3	Constituency
1927 Brixton by-election	James Adams	6,032	28.0	2	
1927 Southend by-election	Erskine Harper	4,777	12.3	3	Constituency
1928 Northampton by-election	Cecil L'Estrange Malone	15,173	37.5	1	Constituency
1928 Faversham by-election	Dudley Aman	11,313	36.2	2	Constituency
1928 Bristol West by-election	Clare Annesley	7,702	26.0	2	Constituency
1928 Lancaster by-election	David R. Davies	6,101	18.1	3	Constituency
1928 Ilford by-election	Charles Robin de Gruchy	8,922	21.9	3	Constituency
1928 St Ives by-election	Frederick Jesse Hopkins	4,343	18.0	3	Constituency
1928 Middlesbrough West by-election	Alonzo Ralph Ellis	10,628	36.0	2	Transport & General Workers
1928 Linlithgowshire by-election	Manny Shinwell	14,446	49.1	1	ILP
1928 Hanley by-election	Arthur Hollins	15,136	60.2	1	Pottery Workers
1928 St Marylebone by-election	David Amyas Ross	6,721	29.4	2	Constituency
1928 Holborn by-election	Percy Allott	2,238	21.0	2	Constituency
1928 Carmarthen by-election	Daniel Hopkin	10,154	35.4	2	Constituency
1928 Epsom by-election	Helen Keynes	3,719	16.8	3	Constituency
1928 Halifax by-election	Arthur Longbottom	17,536	42.8	1	Constituency
1928 Sheffield Hallam by-election	Charles Flynn	5,393	30.8	2	Constituency
1928 Aberdeen North by-election	William Wedgwood Benn	10,646	52.5	1	ILP
1928 Cheltenham by-election	Florence Widdowson	3,962	18.8	3	Constituency
1928 Tavistock by-election	Richard Davies	2,449	10.3	3	Constituency
1928 Ashton-under-Lyne by-election	Albert Bellamy	9,567	40.6	1	Railwaymen
1929 Midlothian and Peebles Northern by-election	Andrew Clarke	7,917	42.0	1	Constituency
1929 Battersea South by-election	William Bennett	11,789	45.5	1	Constituency
1929 Bishop Auckland by-election	Ruth Dalton	14,797	57.1	1	Constituency
1929 Wansbeck by-election	George Shield	20,398	58.0	1	Miners
1929 Liverpool East Toxteth by-election	Joseph Jackson Cleary	6,563	29.2	2	Constituency
1929 Bath by-election	George Gilbert Desmond	6,359	25.7	3	Constituency
1929 Holland with Boston by-election	G. R. Blanco White	9,294	27.3	2	Constituency
1929 North Lanarkshire by-election	Jennie Lee	15,711	57.5	1	ILP
