= Archibald Southby =

Archibald Southby may refer to:

- Sir Archibald Southby, 1st Baronet (1886–1969), British Conservative Member of Parliament 1928–1947
- Sir Archibald Southby, 2nd Baronet (1910–1988), cricketer and British Army officer, son of the 1st Baronet
