= 1928 Epsom by-election =

UK parliamentary by-election

The 1928 Epsom by-election was a parliamentary by-election for the British House of Commons constituency of Epsom, Surrey on 4 July 1928. The by-election was caused by the resignation of the sitting Unionist MP, Sir Rowland Blades. He had been MP here since winning the seat in 1918. Polling Day was set for 4 July 1928.

== Election history ==
Epsom had been created in 1885 and won by a Unionist at every election since. The Unionists even won comfortably in 1923, when there was no Liberal candidate standing. The result at the last General Election was

1924 general election: Epsom Electorate 37,515
Party	Candidate	Votes	%	±%
Unionist	Rowland Blades	20,017	79.5	+8.5
Labour	Philip Butler	5,149	20.5	−8.5
Majority		14,868	59.0	+17.0
Turnout		25,166	67.1	+11.5
Unionist hold		Swing	+8.5	

== Candidates ==
The Epsom Unionist Association chose 41-year-old Comdr. Archibald Southby as their candidate to defend the seat. He served in the Royal Navy and, in the period following the First World War, took part in the demilitarisation of Heligoland.

The Epsom Constituency Labour Party selected Helen Keynes as their candidate to challenge for the seat. She was a member of the Fabian Society.

The Epsom Liberal Association, who had not put forward a candidate since the General election of January 1910, intervened with Samuel Parnell Kerr as their candidate. He had twice contested the neighbouring seat of Guildford, coming second in 1923 and third in 1924. He had been Private Secretary to the leading Liberal, Sir Herbert Samuel and the Insurance Commission. He was a Barrister.

== Result ==
The Unionists held the seat, but the feature of the result was the Liberals pushing Labour into third place.

Epsom by-election, 1928 Electorate 43,292
Party	Candidate	Votes	%	±%
Unionist	Archibald Southby	13,364	60.3	−19.2
Liberal	Samuel Parnell Kerr	5,095	23.0	New
Labour	Helen Keynes	3,719	16.8	−3.7
Majority		8,269	37.2	−21.8
Turnout		22,178	51.2	−15.9
Unionist hold		Swing		

== Aftermath ==
Southby held the seat at the following General Election, against a further challenge from Parnell Kerr, who managed a swing of 1.9% to the Liberals. Keynes did not fight the seat, contesting Horsham and Worthing instead and finishing third. The result at the following General Election;

1929 general election: Epsom Electorate 63,268
Party	Candidate	Votes	%	±%
Unionist	Archibald Southby	24,720	57.8	−2.5
Liberal	Samuel Parnell Kerr	10,422	24.3	+1.3
Labour	Stanley James W Morgan	7,662	17.9	+1.1
Majority		14,298	33.5	−3.7
Turnout		42,804	67.7	+16.5
Unionist hold		Swing	-1.9	

== See also ==
- List of United Kingdom by-elections
- United Kingdom by-election records
