= Southby baronets =

Baronetcy in the Baronetage of the United Kingdom

The Southby Baronetcy, of Burford in the County of Oxford, is a title in the Baronetage of the United Kingdom. It was created on 12 June 1937 for Archibald Southby, Conservative Member of Parliament for Epsom. The second Baronet was a cricketer.

== Southby baronets, of Burford (1937) ==
- Sir Archibald Richard James Southby, 1st Baronet (1886–1969)
- Sir (Archibald) Richard Charles Southby, 2nd Baronet (1910–1988)
- Sir John Richard Bilbe Southby, 3rd Baronet (born 1948)

The heir apparent is the present holder's son Peter John Southby (born 1973). His heir-in-line is his eldest son Robert Henry Southby (born 2000).

Coat of arms of Southby baronets
Crest A demi-lion Or holding in the dexter paw an apple Gules. Escutcheon Or a chevron between three apples Gules.
