= Sir Archibald Southby, 1st Baronet =

British politician

Commander Sir Archibald Southby Bt DL
- Southby in 1939

Member of Parliament for Epsom
- In office 5 July 1928 – 3 November 1947
- Preceded by: George Blades
- Succeeded by: Malcolm McCorquodale

Personal details
- Born: 8 July 1886
- Died: 30 October 1969 (aged 83)
- Spouse(s): Phyllis Garton (m. 1909; div. 1962) Noreen Simm (m. 1962)
- Children: Archibald, Patrick

Sir Archibald Richard James Southby, 1st Baronet DL (8 July 1886 – 30 October 1969) was an English Royal Navy officer and Conservative Party politician.

== Career ==
=== Royal Navy ===
Southby joined the Royal Navy, and on 15 September 1902 was posted as a naval cadet to the pre-dreadnought battleship HMS Magnificent, flagship to the second-in-command of the Channel Fleet. The following month it was reported that he would be lent to the armoured cruiser HMS Hogue which was in the last stages of completion before her first commission in November.

In 1908 and 1909 he commanded torpedo boats. In the period following the First World War, he took part in the demilitarisation of Heligoland.

=== Member of Parliament ===
Following his return home to England, he was elected as Member of Parliament (MP) for the Epsom constituency in Surrey at a by-election in 1928.

==== Norway Debate ====
He spoke in the Norway Debate in the House of Commons. Southby spoke immediately after Leo Amery. Amery's famous speech against the government of Neville Chamberlain closed with words, "Depart, I say, and let us have done with you. In the name of God, go". Southby rose at 8.44pm and spoke in defence of the government -

It is easy to talk glibly of Ministers' failure without specifying exactly in what way they have failed; it is easy to throw about charges of ineptitude, inability and procrastination without specifying exactly to what degree those charges are able to be substantiated. I listened to every word that the right hon. Gentleman said. He was full of general accusations of failure against the Government. It seemed to me that if he had been in charge of the affairs of the nation at the beginning of the war, rightly or wrongly, he would have considered that the proper action for us to have taken would have been to have gone into Norway and Sweden before Germany did. He may be right or wrong in that view. But if he was right in that view then we would, I presume, be doing right now to go into Holland and Belgium lest Germany should come in there before us.

— Archibald Southby MP, House of Commons – 7 May 1940

==== Buchenwald ====
Southby travelled as part of the British parliamentary delegation to the Buchenwald concentration camp in April 1945. He described the journey as one, "which I felt it was my duty to undertake and which I shall never regret". However, the journey brought on an illness which was "a most unpleasant mixture of influenza and near jaundice".

==== Later parliamentary career ====
He held the seat for nearly 20 years until his resignation in 1947 by the procedural device of accepting the Stewardship of the Chiltern Hundreds. He was made a Baronet in 1937, of Burford in the county of Oxfordshire.

== Family ==
Southby was twice married: firstly to Phyllis Mary Garton, on 20 July 1909, from whom he was divorced in 1962. They had two sons, Sir Archibald Richard Charles Southby, 2nd Bt, and Lt.-Cdr. Patrick Southby (born 1913). He married secondly to Noreen Vera Simm, on 28 March 1962.

== Arms ==
Coat of arms of Sir Archibald Southby, 1st Baronet
Crest A demi-lion Or holding in the dexter paw an apple Gules. Escutcheon Or a chevron between three apples Gules.

== Notes ==
Parliament of the United Kingdom
Preceded by George Blades	Member of Parliament for Epsom; 1928–1947	Succeeded by Malcolm McCorquodale
Baronetage of the United Kingdom
New creation	Baronet (of Burford); 1937–1969	Succeeded by Sir Archibald Southby
