= Helen Keynes =

British political activist and author

- Born: 1892
- Died: 26 August 1975 (aged 82–83)
- Writing career
- Notable work: The Spanish Marriage

Helen Mary Keynes (1892 – 26 August 1975) was a British political activist and author.

Keynes wrote from an early age. Her first novel, The Spanish Marriage, was written before she turned twenty. She was also a supporter of the Labour Party. By the late 1920s, she served on the executive of the Fabian Society, chaired the Fabian Women's Group, and also served on the executive of the Rural Reconstruction Association.

Keynes stood for Parliament at the 1928 Epsom by-election, taking third place with 16.8% of the vote. She stood again in Horsham and Worthing at the 1929 and 1931 general elections, taking third place on each occasion, and finally in Southend at the 1935 general election, where she again came third. Alongside these candidacies, she served as secretary of the Society of Labour Candidates, which helped candidates network and share ideas.

Keynes continued to write during the 1930s and 1940s, her works including Murder In Rosemary Lane, and Salute To The Brave (under the pseudonym "Clementine Hunter").
