= Skene Mackay =

Scottish politician and trade unionist

Benjamin Skene Mackay (1883 – 24 January 1930) was a Scottish politician and trade unionist.

Born in Elgin, Moray in Scotland, Mackay left school at the age of nine and, in time, became a vehicle body builder. He joined the United Kingdom Society of Coachmakers, which sponsored him to attend Ruskin College in 1909. While he was in attendance, he participated in the students' strike and was subsequently a founder of the rival Central Labour College and a leading figure in the Plebs' League. He also joined the Independent Labour Party.

In 1912, Mackay was elected as a Labour Party member of Kensington Borough Council. That year, he also became the full-time London District Secretary of the Coachmakers. In the run-up to World War I, he realised that many more aircraft workers would be needed, and he began recruiting them into the Coachmakers. This campaign was a success, and in 1915 he was appointed as the union's national organiser.

Mackay continued his political activity, standing in Hampstead at the 1918 United Kingdom general election, managing only a distant second place with 19.3% of the vote. He also stood unsuccessfully in Hampstead at the 1919 London County Council election. He was elected to Hampstead Borough Council in 1922, but at the 1922 and 1923 United Kingdom general elections, he instead stood in Hitchin, and in the 1922 London County Council election he stood in Limehouse, without success.

Mackay left the Coachmakers in 1922 and became secretary of the Industrial Orthopaedic Society. He also worked as a socialist journalist, mostly on behalf of the co-operative Party and the Fabian Society. At the 1924 United Kingdom general election, he stood in Moray and Nairn, then in 1929 he stood in Mitcham. He then suffered an accident which forced him out of activity for some months and, though he recovered sufficiently to find work as the London correspondent of the Munich Illustrierte Presse, he caught pneumonia and died early in 1930.

In his official Labour Party obituary, Mackay was described as "gifted with a lively humour, blended with a fervent belief in the Cause he made his own". It praised his enthusiasm and effectiveness as an organiser, but noted that his Parliamentary campaigns "courted certain defeat".
