= James Jonas Dodd =

British solicitor and political activist

James Jonas Dodd (1863 – September 1925) was a British solicitor and political activist.

Born in Woolwich, Dodd was educated at Colfe's School in Lewisham. He qualified as a solicitor, specialising in representing working-class members of Hoxton Hall, Kingsgate Baptist Church, and Bell Street Domestic Mission. He also spent time living in Spennymoor and West Hartlepool, and wrote a History of Spennymoor.

Dodd worked as a solicitor for many years, and became known as an advocate of legal reform, giving evidence to the Divorce Commission. He joined the Fabian Society in 1910, and through it became active in the Labour Party. He stood unsuccessfully in Hereford at the 1922 United Kingdom general election, and in St Marylebone at the 1923 United Kingdom general election.

Dodd also wrote several books under the pseudonym "Arnold Crossley", including Marriage and Baby Culture and the Compleat Baby Book.
