= 1928 St Ives by-election =

UK parliamentary by-election

- 6 March 1928
Candidate	Runciman	Caird	Hopkins
Party	Liberal	Unionist	Labour
Popular vote	10,241	9,478	4,343
Percentage	42.6%	39.4%	18.0%
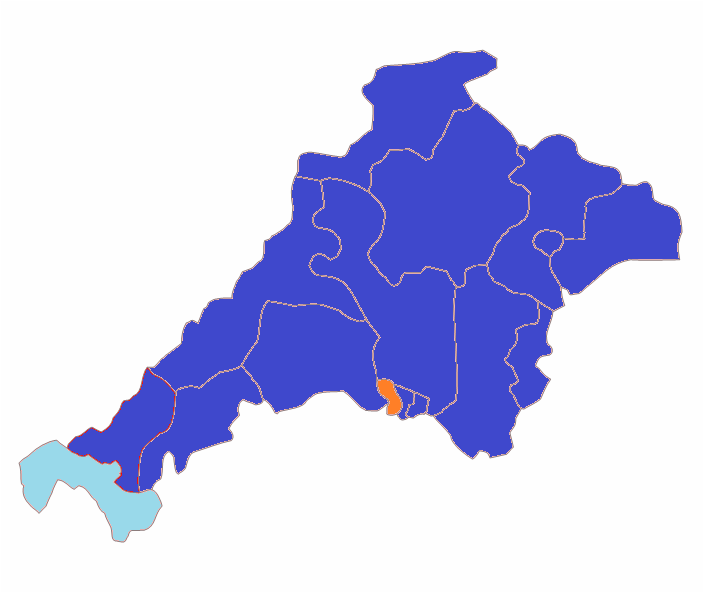
MP before election
Anthony Hawke
Unionist
Subsequent MP
Hilda Runciman
Liberal

The 1928 St Ives by-election was a by-election held on 6 March 1928 for the British House of Commons constituency of St Ives in Cornwall.

== Vacancy ==
The by-election was caused by the resignation of the sitting Unionist Party Member of Parliament (MP) Anthony Hawke on his appointment to be a High Court judge.

== Electoral history ==
Hawke had first won the seat at the 1922 general election. He lost it to the Liberal candidate Sir Clifford Cory at the 1923 general election when there was also a Labour candidate in the field but won it back from Cory in a straight fight in 1924.

General Election 1924: St Ives
Party	Candidate	Votes	%	±%
Unionist	Anthony Hawke	11,159	53.0	+12.4
Liberal	Clifford Cory	9,912	47.0	+0.5
Majority		1,247	6.0	N/A
Turnout		21,071	69.1	−2.3
Unionist gain from Liberal		Swing	+6.0	

== Candidates ==
- The Unionists picked Sir Andrew Caird (1870-1956) one of Lord Northcliffe’s newspaper editors and directors to defend the seat.
- The Liberal Party challenger was Hilda Runciman, the wife of leading Liberal MP, Rt Hon. Walter Runciman.
- The Reverend Frederick Jesse Hopkins, intervened for the Labour Party.

== Campaign ==
The by-election was a three-cornered contest, though given the electoral history of the seat it was always regarded as a two-horse race between Unionist and Liberal.

The circumstances in which Hilda Runciman came to be selected as Liberal candidate were an issue in the by-election. Her husband, Walter, who was Liberal MP for Swansea West, had decided to transfer to St Ives at the next general election. When the by-election was caused by Hawke’s resignation, Hilda was adopted as Liberal candidate to keep the seat warm for her husband.

Liberal party leader David Lloyd George did not approve of Hilda’s candidacy; the Liberal Council, a band of Liberal politicians which Walter led, had voted to oppose Lloyd George's Yellow Book, which set out many of his key positions. Runciman refused to have Lloyd George speak on her behalf during the campaign However, Deputy Leader Sir Herbert Samuel did travel to the constituency to speak on her behalf.

The use of Hilda to keep the seat warm for her husband attracted Tory derision, and became a campaign issue.

== Result ==
The result was a victory for Mrs Runciman, who overturned Hawke’s majority of 1,247 to win by a majority of 763 votes.

St Ives by-election, 1928
Party	Candidate	Votes	%	±%
Liberal	Hilda Runciman	10,241	42.6	−4.4
Unionist	Andrew Caird	9,478	39.4	−13.6
Labour	Frederick Jesse Hopkins	4,343	18.0	New
Majority		763	3.2	N/A
Turnout		24,062	77.4	+8.3
Liberal gain from Unionist		Swing	+4.6	

Runciman was the third woman parliamentary candidate ever to be elected for the Liberal Party, after Margaret Wintringham and Vera Terrington. On election she joined her husband in the House of Commons, the first married couple to sit in the House together. She was the first female Cornish MP and the only Cornish Liberal MP at the time (though the Liberals won all five Cornish seats in the general election the next year).

== Aftermath ==
Runciman duly stood down in her husband’s favour at the 1929 general election and he held the seat for the Liberal Party, again defeating Caird.

General Election 1929: St Ives
Party	Candidate	Votes	%	±%
Liberal	Walter Runciman	12,433	43.2	+0.6
Unionist	Andrew Caird	11,411	39.7	+0.3
Labour	W E Arnold-Forster	4,920	17.1	−0.9
Majority		1,032	3.5	+0.3
Turnout		28,764	76.5	−0.9
Liberal hold		Swing	+0.15	

Runciman sought re-election at the General Election of 1929 at the Unionist held seat of Tavistock, but finished second. Hopkins also moved to contest Penryn & Falmouth and again finished third.

This was seen as one of the two ‘warming pan’ by-elections in the 1924-1929 Parliament, alongside Hugh Dalton's wife successfully contesting the 1929 Bishop Auckland by-election with her husband contesting it at the 1929 general election.

== See also ==
- List of United Kingdom by-elections (1918–1931)
- Politics of Cornwall
