= Ernest Stanford =

British politician (1894–1966)

Ernest Stanford CBE
- Born: 27 November 1894; Horsham, Sussex, England
- Died: 14 April 1966 (aged 71)

Ernest Stanford CBE (27 November 1894 – 14 April 1966) was a British politician.

== Early life ==
Born in Horsham in Sussex, Stanford was educated in Crawley. He served in the Royal Army Medical Corps during World War I.

== Political career ==
=== Standing for Parliament ===
Around the end of the war, he joined the Independent Labour Party (ILP), within which he became a prominent supporter of Ramsay Macdonald. The ILP was affiliated to the Labour Party, and in 1919, Stanford was a founder member of Crawley Labour Party.

At the 1923 United Kingdom general election, Stanford stood unsuccessfully for Horsham and Worthing, and although he stood again in 1924, his vote share fell back further. In 1931, he joined the National Labour Organisation, Macdonald's split from the Labour Party, and he was adopted as its candidate for Wolverhampton West. On nomination day, Stanford agreed to withdraw in favour of a National Liberal Party candidate, and he instead spent the election campaigning for Macdonald in Seaham.

Stanford finally stood for National Labour in Southwark Central at the 1935 United Kingdom general election; he took 47% of the vote but was not elected. He remained active in the party, and in 1939 was elected to its executive committee, as the representative of the National Labour Candidates' Association. For his work for the party, in 1933 he was made a Commander of the Order of the British Empire.

From 1932, Stanford worked as National Appeals Organiser for the British Empire Cancer Campaign, then from 1939 until 1959 he filled the same role at St Dunstan's.

=== Crawley ===
In 1947, Stanford was elected as chair of Crawley Parish Council, and he became vice-chair of the Crawley Development Corporation which developed a new town around the village.

== Retirement and death ==
He later retired to Angmering.
