= Sir Archibald Southby, 2nd Baronet =

English cricketer and British Army officer

Personal information
- Full name: Archibald Richard Charles Southby
- Born: 18 June 1910; Devonport, Devon, England
- Died: 4 April 1988 (aged 77); Ashford, Kent, England
- Batting: Right-handed

Domestic team information
- Years: Team
- 1935/36–1936/37: Madras
- 1935/36–1936/37: Europeans

Career statistics
| Competition | First-class |
|---|---|
| Matches | 7 |
| Runs scored | 158 |
| Batting average | 13.16 |
| 100s/50s | –/– |
| Top score | 33 |
| Catches/stumpings | 3/– |
- Source: Cricinfo, 16 May 2019

Sir Archibald Richard Charles Southby, 2nd Baronet OBE (18 June 1910 – 4 April 1988) was an English first-class cricketer and British Army officer. Southby served in the Rifle Brigade from 1933 to 1948, seeing action in the Second World War, for which he was made an OBE and received the Medal of Freedom. He also played first-class cricket in British India for Madras and the Europeans, as well as appearing for the British Army cricket team. He succeeded his father as the 2nd Baronet of the Soutby Baronetcy in 1969, before being succeeded by his son upon his death in 1988.

== Early life and military career ==
The son of Sir Archibald Southby, 1st Baronet and wife, Phyllis Mary Garton, he was born at Devonport. He was educated at Eton College, before going up to Magdalen College, Oxford. While at Oxford he served in the Oxford University contingent of the Officers' Training Corps, firstly as a cadet before gaining the rank of second lieutenant in March 1931. From Magdalen he chose a career in the British Army, serving with the Rifle Brigade. He was promoted to the rank of lieutenant in December 1933, while in October the following year he was seconded to serve in British India as aide-de-camp to the Governors of Madras.

While in British India, Southby made his debut in first-class cricket for Madras against Hyderabad at Madras in December 1935. In January 1936, he played for the Europeans against the Indians in the Madras Presidency. He made three further first-class appearances for Madras in 1936, including against the touring Australians, before making a final appearance for the Europeans against the Indians in January 1937. He vacated his role as aide-de-camp in November 1937 and was restored to the Rifle Brigade. He was promoted to the rank of captain in December 1938. He made a final appearance in first-class cricket for the British Army cricket team against Cambridge University at Fenner's in 1939, bringing his total first-class appearances to seven. He scored a total of 158 runs in these, with a high score of 33.

== WWII and later life ==
Southby served with the Rifle Brigade in the Second World War, seeing action in the Italian Campaign. He was made an OBE in December 1945, for his part in the Italian Campaign. He was promoted to the rank of major in July 1946, with him retiring from active service in May 1948, upon which he was granted the honorary rank of lieutenant colonel. In May 1948, he was awarded the Medal of Freedom by the United States. Upon the death of his father in October 1969, he succeeded him as the 2nd Baronet. He later emigrated to Zimbabwe, where he lived on a farm at Eldorado. He returned to England in his later years, where he died at Ashford in April 1988. Upon his death, he was succeeded as the 3rd Baronet by his son, John.

Coat of arms of Sir Archibald Southby, 2nd Baronet
| Crest A demi-lion Or holding in the dexter paw an apple Gules. Escutcheon Or a chevron between three apples Gules. |

Baronetage of the United Kingdom
| Preceded by Sir Archibald Southby | Baronet (of Burford); 1969–1988 | Succeeded by Sir John Southby |
