= Percy Myers =

British political activist

Percival Myers (1887 – 5 January 1967) was a British political activist.

Born in Otley, Myers became a printers' engineer, and joined the Amalgamated Society of Engineers in 1908. He also became active in the Labour Party, for which he stood in Pudsey and Otley at the 1922, 1923 and 1924 UK general elections. His best performance was in 1924, when he came second, with 25.3% of the vote.
