= Frederick Jesse Hopkins =

British minister of religion and socialist activist

Frederick Jesse Hopkins (1876 – 1934) was a British minister of religion and socialist activist.

Born in Alderney, Dorset, Hopkins began working in a brickyard at the age of twelve. He then attended Hartley College in Manchester, and in 1900 became a Primitive Methodist minister, responsible for various churches. He became very interested in rural life and conditions, and joined the Labour Party. In 1919, he left the ministry to focus on political work. In 1921, he became the general secretary of the East Dorset District Labour Party, and in 1922 he began working full-time for the party as a propagandist in South West England.

Hopkins stood for Labour in Bournemouth at the 1918 UK general election, East Dorset at the 1922 and 1923 UK general elections, in Penryn and Falmouth at the 1924 and 1929 UK general elections, and in the 1928 St Ives by-election, but was never elected.

In 1928, Hopkins was appointed as the Labour Party's regional organiser for the Eastern Counties, taking over from Bill Holmes. He died in 1934.
