= Horsham and Worthing =

Former parliamentary constituency in the United Kingdom

- Former county constituency for the House of Commons

1918–1945
- Seats: one
- Created from: Horsham, Lewes and Chichester
- Replaced by: Horsham and Worthing

Horsham and Worthing was a county constituency in West Sussex, centred on the towns of Horsham and Worthing in West Sussex. It returned one Member of Parliament (MP) to the House of Commons of the Parliament of the United Kingdom, elected by the first past the post system.

== History ==
The constituency was created for the 1918 general election, and abolished for the 1945 general election. Its territory was then divided between the new constituencies of Worthing and Horsham.

== Boundaries ==
The Borough of Worthing, the Urban Districts of Horsham, Shoreham, and Southwick, and the Rural Districts of Horsham, Steyning West, and Thakeham.

== Members of Parliament ==
Election	Member	Party
1918	Earl Winterton	Conservative
1945	constituency abolished: see Horsham and Worthing	

Throughout its existence, the constituency elected the same MP, Edward Turnour, 6th Earl Winterton, who had previously been MP for Horsham. When the Horsham constituency was re-established in 1945, Turnour was re-elected there, and held that seat until he stepped down at the 1951 general election after 47 years in Parliament.

== Election results ==
=== Elections in the 1910s ===
General election 1918: Horsham and Worthing
Party		Candidate	Votes	%	±%
C	Unionist	Edward Turnour	15,644	86.0	
	Independent	Emmanuel Rodocanachi	2,544	14.0	
Majority			13,100	72.0	
Turnout			18,188	42.2	
Registered electors			43,142		
	Unionist win (new seat)				
C indicates candidate endorsed by the coalition government.

=== Elections in the 1920s ===
General election 1922: Horsham and Worthing
Party	Candidate	Votes	%	±%
Unionist	Edward Turnour	Unopposed		
Unionist hold				

General election 1923: Horsham and Worthing
Party	Candidate	Votes	%	±%
Unionist	Edward Turnour	17,925	66.8	N/A
Labour	Ernest Stanford	8,892	33.2	New
Majority		9,033	33.6	N/A
Turnout		26,817	59.0	N/A
Registered electors		46,438		
Unionist hold		Swing	N/A	

General election 1924: Horsham and Worthing
Party	Candidate	Votes	%	±%
Unionist	Edward Turnour	23,715	75.9	+9.1
Labour	Ernest Stanford	7,537	24.1	−9.1
Majority		16,178	51.8	+18.2
Turnout		31,252	65.7	+6.7
Registered electors		47,557		
Unionist hold		Swing	+9.1	

General election 1929: Horsham and Worthing
Party	Candidate	Votes	%	±%
Unionist	Edward Turnour	27,872	60.1	−15.8
Liberal	Percy Boyden	10,905	23.5	New
Labour	Helen Keynes	7,611	16.4	−7.7
Majority		16,967	36.6	−15.2
Turnout		46,388	66.1	+0.4
Registered electors		70,220		
Unionist hold		Swing	−4.1	

=== Elections in the 1930s ===
General election 1931: Horsham and Worthing
Party	Candidate	Votes	%	±%
Conservative	Edward Turnour	44,886	88.33	
Labour	Helen Keynes	5,932	11.67	
Majority		38,954	76.66	
Turnout		50,818	67.32	
Conservative hold		Swing		

General election 1935: Horsham and Worthing
Party	Candidate	Votes	%	±%
Conservative	Edward Turnour	41,478	76.89	
Labour	Harold William Paton	12,466	23.11	
Majority		29,012	53.78	
Turnout		53,944	60.26	
Conservative hold		Swing		

General Election 1939–40:

Another General Election was required to take place before the end of 1940. The political parties had been making preparations for an election to take place and by the Autumn of 1939, the following candidates had been selected;

- Conservative: Edward Turnour
- Labour: A W Wright
- British Union: Jorian Jenks
