= Fareham by-election =

Fareham by-election may refer to one of three parliamentary by-elections held for the British House of Commons constituency of Fareham in Hampshire:

- 1918 Fareham by-election
- 1931 Fareham by-election
- 1939 Fareham by-election

== See also ==
- Fareham (UK Parliament constituency)
- Fareham Borough Council elections
