= Dymoke White =

British politician (1888–1968)

Sir Rudolph Dymoke White, 2nd Baronet, DL (11 June 1888 – 25 May 1968) was a Conservative Party politician in England who served as member of parliament (MP) for Fareham in Hampshire from 1939 to 1950.

He was elected unopposed at a by-election in 1939, after the sitting MP Thomas Inskip was elevated to peerage as Viscount Caldecote.

Fareham had been a safe Conservative seat since the constituency was established in 1885, with a Conservative returned unopposed as recently as 1931, and where contested elections had produced huge Conservative majorities (the Tories' 30% majority in 1939 was a lowpoint by Fareham standards). However at the 1945 general election, which the Labour Party won in a landslide, White's majority in Fareham was cut to only 5% of the votes.

The Fareham constituency was abolished in boundary changes for the 1950 general election, and White did not contest the new Gosport and Fareham constituency.

Parliament of the United Kingdom
Preceded by Thomas Inskip	Member of Parliament for Fareham; 1939 – 1950	Constituency abolished
Baronetage of the United Kingdom
Preceded by Woolmer Rudolph Donati White	Baronet (of Salle Park, Norfolk); 1931–1968	Succeeded by Headley Dymoke White
