= Ashley Bramall =

British politician

Sir Ashley Bramall

Member of Parliament for Bexley
- In office 22 July 1946 – 3 February 1950
- Preceded by: Jennie Adamson
- Succeeded by: Edward Heath

Personal details
- Born: Ernest Ashley Bramall; 6 January 1916
- Died: 10 February 1999 (aged 83)
- Party: Labour
- Spouse: Margaret Taylor (m. 1939, divorced)
- Children: 2
- Relatives: Edwin Bramall (brother)
- Education: Magdalen College, Oxford

Sir Ernest Ashley Bramall (6 January 1916 – 10 February 1999) was a British Labour Party politician, Member of Parliament for Bexley from 1946 to 1950 and Leader of the Inner London Education Authority (ILEA) for 11 years. He married twice – his first wife, Margaret, led the National Council for One Parent Families and looked after their two children.

== Family and early career ==
Bramall's family were wealthy merchants from Hampshire, but his mother was a socialist and did much to convince her son to support the left in politics. He attended Westminster School briefly, before moving to Canford School for the benefit of his health. He went up to Magdalen College, Oxford, in the mid-1930s to read Philosophy, Politics and Economics. He was elected to chair the Oxford University Labour Club in 1938. At Oxford he was an active debater at the Oxford Union Society where he often debated with Edward Heath. He was Treasurer of the Union in 1939.

He met Margaret Elaine Taylor there; they married in 1939 and they had two children but later divorced. She went on to lead the National Council for One Parent Families and her one parent family.

On the outbreak of war, Bramall had joined the Northamptonshire Yeomanry, into which he was commissioned in 1941. He transferred to the Reconnaissance Corps later the same year and also served at the Army Staff College in Camberley, being promoted to major.

After the end of the war, he served in Germany in the Allied administration. His younger brother Edwin (known as 'Dwin') was much later to be appointed Chief of the Defence Staff and created Lord Bramall.

== Parliament ==
Bramall had already begun his political career by fighting Fareham for the Labour Party in the 1945 general election, and when a vacancy occurred at Bexley he was selected to fight the by-election. During the campaign, the Government was forced to introduce rationing of bread, which had never been needed during the war, and many were impressed that Bramall won the seat narrowly. He made a successful maiden speech outlining the difficulties in administering Germany and removing Nazi-controlled institutions of government.

In the 1950 election, Bramall lost his seat by 133 votes to his old University adversary Edward Heath with whom he always remained personally friendly. He had already taken up a career outside politics by reading for the Bar, and was called in 1949 to the Inner Temple. He specialised in landlord and tenant issues. He tried to win Bexley back in 1951 and 1959, and also made an unsuccessful attempt at Watford in 1955.

== Municipal affairs ==
Bramall was active in local politics in the Metropolitan Borough of Westminster although the local boundaries made it extremely difficult for Labour candidates to win seats. The boundaries had been the same since 1900 and in the mid-1950s the Council decided to change them, using the Rateable Value of property as one way of making each ward equal in size. The local Labour Party, under Bramall's guidance and advocacy, challenged this method at a public inquiry and persuaded the Boundary Commissioner to accept a new scheme for the wards which Bramall had drawn up.

After this boundary change took effect in 1959 the Labour Party won enough seats to elect him as an Alderman. He was elected as a councillor to the new Westminster City Council; when he lost his seat in 1968 the Conservative group blocked his election as an Alderman. In 1961 he was elected to the London County Council, representing Bethnal Green. He made the transition to the Greater London Council when that body was set up in 1964. He represented Tower Hamlets and then Bethnal Green and Bow. He was one of eight people to serve as a member of the GLC throughout its existence.

Membership of the GLC made him an ex officio member of the Inner London Education Authority and Bramall specialised in education issues. He was Chairman of ILEA from 1965 until Labour lost power in 1967. He was then chosen to lead the Labour Group. Labour won back control in 1970 and Bramall then became Leader of the authority.

== Leader of ILEA ==
In the controversy over education in the 1970s, Bramall stood firmly behind comprehensive schools as a way of raising the educational achievements of most pupils. He was opposed to the use of corporal punishment and had it banned. However, his generally strong leadership did not prevent the scandal over the William Tyndale Junior School in Islington in 1975. He received a knighthood in 1975. Under Bramall, Labour retained control of ILEA in 1977 despite losing the GLC election. He was under pressure to stand as a candidate to replace Reg Goodwin as Labour Leader on the GLC in 1980, but resisted because he wanted to continue at ILEA.

When Margaret Thatcher became Prime Minister she put pressure on local authorities, and especially on ILEA, to cut spending. Bramall was opposed but was not willing to go along with the far left demands for an outright confrontation and legal defiance. This made the left determined to replace him, and when Labour won GLC control in 1981 with a new left-wing majority, Bramall was voted out as ILEA leader. Knowing this was going to happen, Bramall had cleared out his office and left a note to his replacement on the desk before going to the meeting where the vote for leader was to take place.

Bramall remained on the authority and continued to fight for moderate policies, and it was a sign of the respect which the left had for him that they were prepared to choose him as figurehead Chairman of the Authority.

== Retirement ==
Bramall made an unsuccessful attempt to remain on the directly elected ILEA in 1986 at Putney. He was well regarded by Officers of ILEA, especially after the succession of weak far-left leaderships that followed. At his memorial service, a former Chief Officer remarked "Under Ashley Bramall, the ILEA never found it necessary to have a foreign policy".

In his retirement, Bramall held many public appointments including Directorships of the Museum of London, Chairman of the Westminster College of Further Education, and Honorary Secretary of the Theatres Advisory Council. He remained active in local politics as chair of his local party branch and surprised many by his willingness to undertake menial tasks such as delivering leaflets while in his 80s. In 1996 he acted as Agent in a local byelection which saw Mair Garside, formerly his Deputy at ILEA, elected to Westminster City Council.

He had appeared on Mastermind while Leader of ILEA in 1976, taking "British politics since 1918" as his specialist subject, and was an active member of the Masterminders' club. His second wife, Gery Bramall (who was a fellow Westminster councillor), was also on the show.

== Sources ==
- Newsam, Peter (12 February 1999). "Sir Ashley Bramall obituary". The Guardian.

Parliament of the United Kingdom
Preceded by Jennie Adamson	Member of Parliament for Bexley; 1946–1950	Succeeded by Edward Heath
Educational offices
Preceded by Harold Shearman	Chair of the Inner London Education Authority; 1965–1967	Succeeded by Christopher Chataway as Leader
Preceded by Lena Townsend	Leader of the Inner London Education Authority; 1970–1981	Succeeded by Bryn Davies
Civic offices
Preceded by John Ward	Chairman of the Greater London Council; 1982–1983	Succeeded by Harvey Hinds
