= Margaret Bramall =

- Born: Margaret Elaine Taylor; 1 October 1916; Penge, London, England
- Died: 11 August 2007 (aged 90)
- Education: St Paul's Girls' School, Somerville College, Oxford
- Known for: Leading The National Council for the Unmarried Mother and her Child (now called Gingerbread)
- Spouse: Ashley Bramall
- Children: 2

Margaret Elaine Bramall (née Taylor; 1 October 1916 – 11 August 2007) was a British social worker and charity director. She led the National Council for the Unmarried Mother and her Child (now called Gingerbread) from 1963 to 1979.

== Life ==
Bramall was born in Penge in 1916. Her parents were Nettie Kate (née Turquand) and Raymond Taylor. She attended St Paul's Girls' School in Hammersmith and then went to Oxford to take history at Somerville College, Oxford. She was at one time briefly a member of the Communist party but primarily a supporter of the Labour party and an agnostic. She tried to lead a campaign after a fellow student was expelled for having a man in her room, she went on demonstrations and she helped to feed the Jarrow marchers in 1936.

In 1963 Bramall became the director of The National Council for the Unmarried Mother and her Child. She had first hand experience of being a single parent following her divorce but she never used this as a lever. The charity she then led was founded in 1918 by Lettice Fisher to reform the Bastardy Acts which discriminated against illegitimate children and to mitigate the high mortality of children born to parents who were not married.

Bramall raised the organisation's aspirations to end all discrimination and campaign for single parents’ rights. The charity set up finance education schemes and training programmes to help single parents find a place in the new economy.

In 1973, the charity renamed itself as the National Council for One Parent Families. Bramall was able to gain influence over the Finer Report investigating the needs of one parent families. Many of its 230 recommendations for improving the lives of single parent families were from the 280 proposed by her organisation. Bramall was disappointed by the report’s impact and its "lost opportunity" to help what she estimated as one million children. Bramall is quoted as saying that unmarried mothers were seen as "a challenge to society, to our accepted ethical and religious concepts, and to the institution of marriage itself".

Bramall was said to have been "eased out" of her job in 1979.
