= Tower Hamlets (disambiguation) =

Tower Hamlets is a London Borough, created in 1965.

Tower Hamlets may also refer to:

- Tower division, or Tower Hamlets, a Liberty in Middlesex in East London, abolished in 1900
- Tower Hamlets (electoral division), electoral division of the former Greater London Council
- Tower Hamlets (UK Parliament constituency) 1832–1885
- Tower Hamlets, Kent, a location in England
- Tower Hamlets F.C., a football club located within the borough
