= 1939 Fareham by-election =

UK parliamentary by-election

The 1939 Fareham by-election was a parliamentary by-election held for the British House of Commons constituency of Fareham in Hampshire on 6 October 1939. The seat had become vacant when Sir Thomas Inskip, the constituency's Conservative Party Member of Parliament had been ennobled as Viscount Caldecote on 6 September and appointed as Lord Chancellor. Inskip had held the Fareham seat since a by-election in 1931.

The Conservative candidate, Dymoke White, was returned unopposed. During World War II, unopposed by-elections were common, since the major parties had agreed not to contest by-elections when vacancies arose in seats held by the other parties; contests occurred only when independent candidates or minor parties chose to stand, and the Common Wealth Party was formed in 1942 with the specific aim of contesting war-time by-elections.

However, this was the first by-election since the start of the war, and no other candidates were nominated. The last unopposed by-election had been Portsmouth South in July 1939.

== See also ==
- Fareham (UK Parliament constituency)
- 1931 Fareham by-election
- The town of Fareham
- List of United Kingdom by-elections
