= 1938 Dartford by-election =

UK Parliamentary by-election

← 1935	7 November 1938	1945 →

Constituency of Dartford
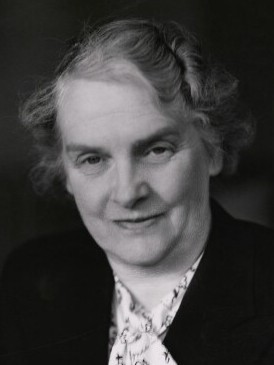
	First party	Second party
		Con
Candidate	Jennie Adamson	Godfrey Mitchell
Party	Labour	Conservative
Popular vote	46,514	42,276
Percentage	52.4%	47.6%
MP before election
Frank Clarke
Conservative
Elected MP
Jennie Adamson
Labour

The 1938 Dartford by-election was held on 7 November 1938. The by-election was held due to the death of the incumbent Conservative MP, Frank Edward Clarke. It was won by the Labour candidate Jennie Adamson. Adamson afterwards stated that she won, because the voters "were ashamed of Mr. Chamberlain's betrayal of Czechoslovakia and of democracy." This was in reference to the Munich Pact, in which the United Kingdom under Prime Minister Chamberlain, accepted Nazi Germany's annexation of the Sudetenland in Czechoslovakia.

Dartford by-election, 1938
Party	Candidate	Votes	%	±%
Labour	Jennie Adamson	46,514	52.4	
Conservative	Godfrey Mitchell	42,276	47.6	
Majority		4,238	4.8	N/A
Turnout		88,790	68.0	
Labour gain from Conservative		Swing		
