= Mary Bennett (academic) =

British academic (1913–2005)

Mary Letitia Somerville Bennett (9 January 1913 – 1 November 2005) was a British academic, best known for her tenure as Principal of St Hilda's College, Oxford between 1965 and 1980.

Born Mary Letitia Somerville Fisher, she was the daughter of historian H. A. L. Fisher and Lettice Fisher, the founder of the National Council for the Unmarried Mother and her Child.

She was educated at Oxford High School. She obtained her first degree (in Classics) from Somerville College, Oxford, and then studied abroad, researching the grain supply of ancient Rome. During the Second World War she worked for the British Ministry of Information and for the BBC, and after the war went into the Colonial Office with responsibility at various times for Gibraltar, Malta and Cyprus.

In 1955, she married senior civil servant John Sloman Bennett. She took over as Principal of St Hilda's, the women's college, from Kathleen Major in 1965.

She was not the obvious choice but she proved ideal. Student power was on the increase and Bennett resisted making protest difficult. It was said that students were encouraged by her to join demonstrations. She resisted the move to mixed colleges as she thought that the men's colleges just wanted to cherry pick her best students. As a result St Hilda's was behind the curve when it finally admitted men as well.

In retirement, she wrote up her researches into family history. St Hilda's commissioned Jean Cooke to paint a portrait of its principal.

The historian, Brian Harrison, interviewed Bennett about her parents and family life in October 1974 as part of the Suffrage Interviews project, titled Oral evidence on the suffragette and suffragist movements: the Brian Harrison interviews.

== Publications ==
- The Ilberts in India, 1882–1886: an Imperial Miniature. London: British Association for Cemeteries in South Asia. 1995.
- Who was Dr Jackson? Two Calcutta Families, 1830–1855. London: British Association for Cemeteries in South Asia. 2002. ISBN 978-0-907799-78-8.
  - Vogeler, Martha S. (11 July 2014). "Bennett, Mary. Who Was Dr Jackson? Two Calcutta Families, 1830–1855". Albion (Review). 36 (2): 388–389. doi:10.2307/4054289. JSTOR 4054289.
- Mary Bennett: an Autobiography. Oxford: St Hilda's College. 2006.
