= Maurice Levitas =

Irish academic (1917–2001)

- Moishe ben Hillel
- Born: 1 February 1917; Dublin, Ireland
- Died: 14 February 2001 (aged 84); London, England
- Family: Max Levitas (brother)
- Military career
- Allegiance: Second Spanish Republic; British Empire (WWII); Communist Party of Great Britain (CPGB)
- Branch: International Brigades (1937-38); Royal Army Medical Corps (1942-48)
- Nickname: Morry Levitas
- Conflicts: Spanish Civil War; Second World War

Maurice Levitas (February 1, 1917 – February 14, 2001) was an Ireland-born British academic and communist. Levitas was involved with the Communist Party of Great Britain and was a Marxist-Lenininist throughout his political life. He was involved in military activity; first becoming involved with Comintern's International Brigades against the Nationalist insurgency during the Spanish Civil War and then during the Second World War, as a British citizen, he joined the British Army's Royal Army Medical Corps. After the War, he remained involved in Communist politics and also became a sociology lecturer at Durham University. In the 1980s, he relocated to the Eastern Bloc, teaching in East Germany, where he edited and translated a book on German politician Erich Honecker titled Erich Honecker Cross Examined.

== Biography ==
=== Early life ===
Levitas was born at 8 Warren Street, in the Portobello district of south inner-city Dublin, an area popularly known as "Little Jerusalem", on 1 February 1917. He was known to his family and friends as "Morry", and was the second of four sons and two daughters born to Harry (Hillel) Levitas, a tailor and trade unionist, and his wife Leah (née Rick). His parents, having each emigrated to Ireland from Lithuania and Latvia around 1912 and 1913, were married in the Camden Street Synagogue in Dublin. Harry Levitas had been active in the Marxist-Zionist movement Poale Zion before leaving Lithuania, and in Dublin became a member of the International Tailors', Machinists' and Pressers' Trade Union, known locally as the "Jewish Union", having started out as a scrap-metal pedlar before working as a tailor's presser. He came to identify himself as a communist rather than a socialist, an outlook he passed on to his children, while Yiddish remained the language of the household, as Leah never became fully fluent in English. Members of the wider family who had stayed behind in Lithuania and Latvia were later murdered in the Holocaust, including relatives killed in Riga and an aunt burned alive with other local Jews in a synagogue in August 1941.

Maurice attended St Peter's Church of Ireland National School in Phibsborough. He sang in the choir at the Warren Street synagogue rather than the wealthier congregation at Adelaide Road, and later recalled sheltering from gunfire during attacks on the nearby Portobello barracks during the War of Independence and the Civil War. In January 1925, reduced family circumstances forced a move to poorer lodgings on St Kevin's Terrace, off Clanbrassil Street.

In 1927, when Morry was ten years old, the family emigrated to Britain, settling first in Glasgow. Although he passed the Scottish qualifying examination and began his secondary education at Glasgow High School, this schooling went unrecognised when the family relocated again, by 1931, to London's East End. Maurice left formal education at fourteen, working in turn as an upholsterer, a plumber's mate and a construction worker.

=== Political activism and the Battle of Cable Street ===
Maurice joined the Young Communist League in 1933, becoming secretary of its Bethnal Green branch, and was shortly afterwards admitted to the Communist Party of Great Britain, of which he remained a member for the rest of his political life. He was also an active trade unionist. Having already been assaulted by British Union of Fascists members while carrying out Young Communist League work in Bethnal Green, Maurice was among the younger Jewish activists who, in October 1936, argued against the advice of the Board of Deputies of British Jews that Jewish residents should stay indoors while Oswald Mosley's BUF marched through the East End. On 4 October, he and his brothers Max and Sol took part in the Battle of Cable Street, when some 5,000 BUF marchers found themselves heavily outnumbered by counter-demonstrators blocking the routes into the East End, and the planned march was abandoned.

=== Spanish Civil War ===
In December 1937, Levitas travelled to Spain and joined the Connolly Column of the International Brigade, fighting for the Spanish Republic against the Nationalist forces of General Franco in the Spanish Civil War. After only minimal training, his unit was sent to reinforce the collapsing Aragon front, and he saw action at the Battle of Belchite. He was captured in 1938, at Calaceite, alongside a squad that included Frank Ryan and Bob Doyle; his parents were initially told he had died in action. Having quietly ignored an order for "Jews, socialists, communists and machine-gunners" to step forward, and having shaved off a beard that gave him what he called an "Old Testament" look, Levitas was sent to the prison camp at San Pedro de Cardeña, near Burgos. There, along with other International Brigade prisoners, he was beaten and stripped for examination by individuals he believed may have been Nazi German "race scientists" attempting to identify supposedly degenerate physical traits, an episode he later compared to the psychometric intelligence testing used by post-war educationalists to select children for higher education.

He was released in February 1939 as part of a prisoner exchange. In order to make contact with the Paris relatives of a fellow German prisoner, he declared himself Irish before returning to London with the reluctant help of the Irish legation there. On 27 February, he addressed a public meeting in Dublin calling for Frank Ryan's release; for the rest of his life, he defended Ryan's leadership and record against accusations of collaboration with the Nazis, before returning to party activism and construction work in London.

=== Marriage and the Second World War ===
In 1941, Levitas married Elizabeth "Liz" Scott, a union that would eventually end in divorce. Together they had three sons, one of whom died in infancy, and two daughters, Diana and Ruth, along with sons Bill and Danny.

Maurice repeatedly tried to enlist in the British forces during the war but, despite (or perhaps because of) his military experience in Spain, was turned down until after the 1942 Axis invasion of the Soviet Union. He then enlisted in the Royal Army Medical Corps and served in India and Burma.

=== Teaching career and academic life ===
On discharge, Levitas returned to construction work; in 1948, having resumed employment as a plumber, he was offered a place on a year-long emergency Teachers' Training College course, a scheme set up that September to address the post-war shortage of teachers. He subsequently taught English and drama in state schools in London (1949 to 1963) and Lincolnshire (1963 to 1966), work in which he stressed the value of dramatic productions in engaging reluctant pupils. During this period, he also served as secretary of the Hammersmith branch of the Communist Party of Great Britain, and in 1958 earned an honours degree (B.Sc.) in sociology as an external student of the University of London.

In 1966, Levitas became a senior lecturer in the sociology of education at Neville's Cross Teacher Training College, later absorbed into Durham University, where he taught until his retirement in 1982. In 1967, he married a second time, to Jackie "Sheila J." Ford (née Litherland), with whom he had a daughter, Rachel, and a son, Ben; this marriage, too, ended in divorce.

Levitas remained an ardent Marxist–Leninist and a supporter of the Soviet Union, staying a Communist Party member even as his convictions were tested by the invasion of Czechoslovakia that crushed the Prague Spring of 1968, a move he opposed. Colleagues nonetheless felt he greeted the events of that year with undue optimism about their revolutionary potential. Former students remembered him as a passionate, outspoken mentor with a deep love of music, and in 1974 he published the well-regarded Marxist Perspectives in the Sociology of Education. He viewed Marxism as a force capable of unlocking potential in every person, disliked the term "unskilled labour", and took pride in the sewing skills he had picked up as an upholsterer in his youth.

=== East Germany and later years ===
Following his retirement, Levitas emigrated to East Germany in 1985 to work as an English teacher, taking up a post at the Karl Liebknecht Pädagogische Hochschule in Potsdam. While based there, he edited and translated a book on German politician Erich Honecker, titled Erich Honecker Cross Examined. From 1989, he began making regular visits back to Dublin, most often for commemorations connected with the International Brigade.

He returned to Britain for good in January 1991, following the collapse of the German Democratic Republic, and complained that it had been followed by a revival of xenophobia and a decline in social provision. Back in Britain, he joined the New Communist Party of Britain, a hardline faction that had broken away from the Communist Party of Great Britain in 1977 (a separate body to the Communist Party of Britain, of which his brother Max was a member), and wrote for its journal, The New Worker, under the pen-names "M. Satliev" and "M. ben Hillel". He campaigned against the 1991 imprisonment and trial in Germany of the former GDR leader Erich Honecker, who had ordered the shooting of those attempting to flee across the Berlin Wall but had himself been imprisoned by the Third Reich for clandestine communist activity; Levitas's translated edition of Honecker's defence statement was published in 1992. He also translated Spanish-language poetry, including Pablo Neruda's Canto General.

On 4 May 1991, as part of a commemoration of the Connolly Column, Levitas read the roll of honour of Irish International Brigade casualties at the unveiling of a commemorative plaque on Eden Quay, near Liberty Hall, Dublin, voicing pride in the growing public interest in the Spanish war and describing it as part of a wider, ongoing struggle against oppression. On what proved to be his final visit to Spain, in November 1996, he welcomed the granting of honorary Spanish citizenship to all International Brigade veterans as a vindication of their cause. He last visited Dublin in February 1997, when he attended a reception at the Mansion House for the five surviving Irish veterans of the International Brigade, among them Michael O'Riordan.

=== Death ===
Maurice Levitas died in London on 14 February 2001. His daughter from his first marriage is the sociologist Ruth Levitas, and his son from his second marriage is the theatre historian Ben Levitas.

== Publications ==
- Marxist Perspectives in the Sociology of Education by Maurice Levitas (1974)
- Erich Honecker Cross Examined edited and translated by Maurice Levitas(1992)

== See also ==
- George Nathan
- Charlie Hutchison
- Bill Alexander
- Thora Silverthorne
- Ralph Winston Fox
