= Frank Clarke (British politician) =

British politician (1886–1938)

Frank Edward Clarke MP

Member of Parliament for Dartford
- In office 27 October 1931 – 12 July 1938
- Preceded by: John Edmund Mills
- Succeeded by: Jennie Adamson

Personal details
- Born: Frank Edward Clarke; 21 November 1886
- Died: 12 July 1938 (aged 51)
- Party: Conservative

Frank Edward Clarke (21 November 1886 – 12 July 1938) was a Conservative Party politician in England.

He was elected at the 1931 general election as member of parliament (MP) for Dartford, and held the seat until his death in 1938, aged 51.

Parliament of the United Kingdom
Preceded by John Edmund Mills	Member of Parliament for Dartford; 1931 – 1938	Succeeded by Jennie Adamson
