= Max Levitas =

British communist activist and councillor (1915-2018)

- Max Levitas in 1945
- Born: 1 June 1915; Dublin, Ireland
- Died: 2 November 2018 (aged 103)
- Occupation: Councillor
- Known for: Participant in the Battle of Cable Street
- Political party: Communist Party of Great Britain
- Family: Maurice Levitas (Brother); Sol (Brother)

Max Samuel Levitas (1 June 1915 – 2 November 2018) was an Ireland-born British communist activist and councillor, prominent in the East End of London for many years. The brother of communist activist Maurice Levitas, Max Levitas was a member of the Young Communist League and later the Communist Party of Great Britain.

As part of his involvement in politics, in opposition to the British Union of Fascists, Levitas was involved in political violence as part of the Cable Street riot with the Metropolitan Police. As part of his involvement with the CPGB, he was a councillor on Stepney Borough Council and then Tower Hamlets London Borough Council during the 1940s. When division grew within the CPGB over Eurocommunism in the late 1980s, he joined the re-established Communist Party of Britain.

== Biography ==
Levitas was born in the Portobello area of Dublin, where he attended St Peter's School. His parents were Yiddish-speaking Jews fleeing pogroms in Imperial Russia: Lithuanian-born Harry and Latvian-born Leah. Harry was prominent in the Amalgamated Jewish Tailors', Machinists' and Pressers' Union, and this led to his blacklisting by employers. As a result, in 1927, the family moved to Glasgow, and Max left education.

In Glasgow, Levitas became interested in communism, and when he was 16, he joined the Young Communist League. In 1931, he moved with his family to the East End of London, and he joined his father in the clothing industry, becoming a tailors' presser. He became secretary of the Mile End branch of the YCL, which his younger brother Maurice also joined.

In the East End, Levitas devoted much of his time to anti-fascism; in 1934, he was arrested for writing "all out against fascism" on three sides of Nelson's Column, having later returned to the scene to admire his work, while still carrying the paintbrush. In 1936, he was involved in the Battle of Cable Street, where Jewish people and socialists prevented a march of fascists through the East End. On his death, the Morning Star described him as the "last survivor of the Battle of Cable Street".

The communists' other main campaign in the East End in the 1930s was against unfair rents. In 1939, Levitas led a four-month rent strike at Brady Street Mansions, where he lived, as did his grandmother. Through this, he met his future wife, Sadie Freedman. He continued to work in the garment trade, serving as a shop steward for the Tailors' and Garment Workers' Union. During World War II, he served as a fire warden. With Phil Piratin, he organised an occupation of the bomb shelter at the Savoy Hotel, in protest at the lack of such shelters in the East End; a few days later, the government agreed to open underground stations as bomb shelters.

Becoming well known as a speaker, Levitas graduated to Stepney Communist Party (CPGB), for which in 1943 he co-authored "Stepney: A Borough to Be Proud Of". In 1946, he was one of ten CPGB candidates to win election to Stepney Borough Council. He served several terms of office, latterly on Tower Hamlets London Borough Council. When he lost his final election, in 1971, he had been a councillor for a total of fifteen years. He stood unsuccessfully in Stepney at the 1952 and 1955 London County Council elections. He stood unsuccessfully for the Greater London Council in Tower Hamlets in 1970 and Stepney and Poplar in 1973, 1977 and 1981.

After standing down as a councillor, Levitas became a market trader, working in Dunstable, although he continued to live in the East End. He remained active in the CPGB, eventually joining its Communist Party of Britain (CPB) split, and also in local tenants' and pensioners' groups, and anti-racism campaigns. He retired from work when he was eighty, but continued campaigning. In 2002, he unveiled a plaque in Dublin marking the site of the Camden Street Synagogue and Tailors' and Pressers' Union. In 2013, he addressed a rally opposing the English Defence League, and when he was 99, he led a campaign against high repair bills at his flats on Sidney Street.

Levitas was a fan of Tottenham Hotspur F.C., and frequently attended games with his son, Stephen, until Stephen's death in 2014. For his 100th birthday, the team gave him a card and a pennant signed by all the team members. The following year, he became the world's oldest Dementia Friend. He remained a member of the CPB until his death, becoming its oldest and longest-serving member.

Levitas died in November 2018, aged 103, with tributes paid by Jeremy Corbyn, leader of the British Labour Party, and Michael D. Higgins, President of Ireland.
