= Arthur Lee, 1st Viscount Lee of Fareham =

British politician

The Right Honourable The Viscount Lee of Fareham GCB GCSI GBE PC
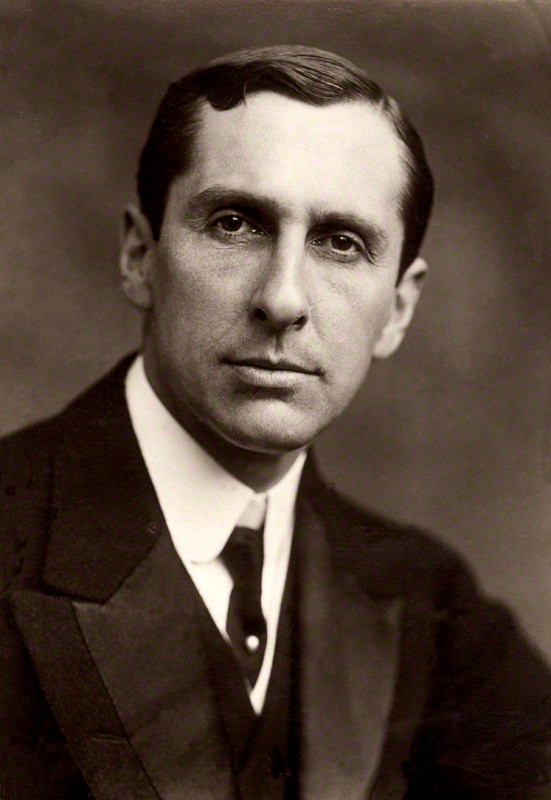
- Lee in 1903

First Lord of the Admiralty
- In office 13 February 1921 – 31 October 1922
- Monarch: George V
- Prime Minister: David Lloyd George; Bonar Law
- Preceded by: Walter Long
- Succeeded by: Leo Amery

Minister of Agriculture and Fisheries
- In office 15 August 1919 – 13 February 1921
- Monarch: George V
- Prime Minister: David Lloyd George
- Preceded by: Rowland Edmund Prothero
- Succeeded by: Arthur Griffith-Boscawen

Personal details
- Born: Arthur Hamilton Lee; 8 November 1868 Bridport, Dorset, England
- Died: 21 July 1947 (aged 78) Avening, Gloucestershire, England
- Party: Conservative
- Spouse: Ruth Moore Lee
- Education: Cheltenham College; Royal Military Academy, Woolwich
- Occupation: Politician, statesman and public servant, soldier, philanthropist and patron of the arts.

Arthur Hamilton Lee, 1st Viscount Lee of Fareham (8 November 1868 – 21 July 1947) was an English soldier, diplomat, politician, philanthropist and patron of the arts. After military postings and an assignment to the British Embassy in Washington, he retired from the military in 1900. He entered politics, was first elected in 1900, and later served as Minister of Agriculture and Fisheries and First Lord of the Admiralty following the First World War. He donated his country house, Chequers, to the nation as a retreat for the Prime Minister, and co-founded the Courtauld Institute of Art.

== Early life and family ==
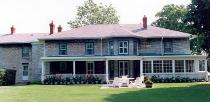
Lee's former residence at the Royal Military College of Canada

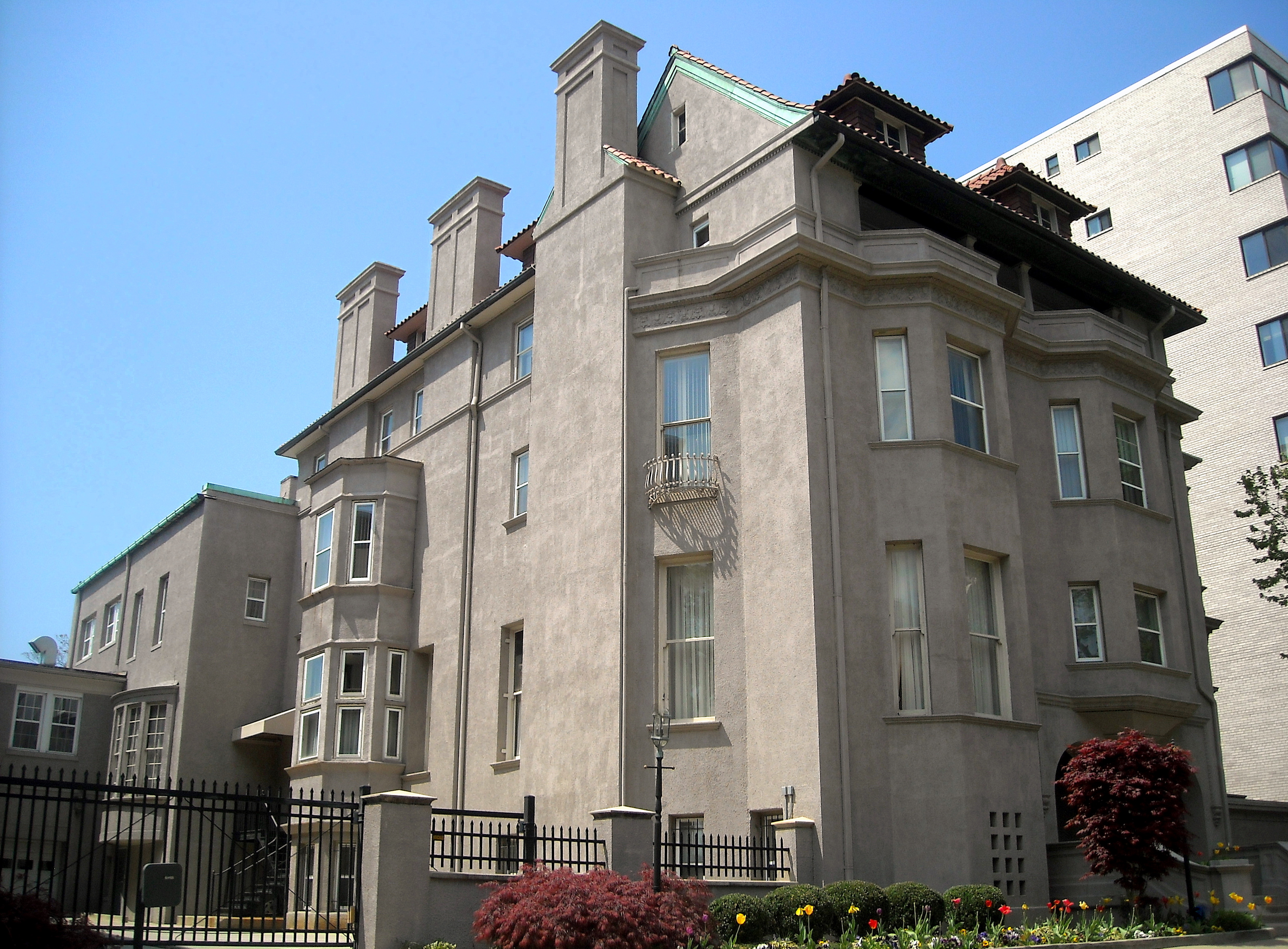
Lee's former residence in Washington, D.C.

Arthur Hamilton Lee was born at The Rectory, Bridport, Dorset, in 1868. His father, Rev. Melville Lauriston Lee was rector of the town's Anglican St. Mary's Church. He was a grandson of Sir John Theophilus Lee, who as a midshipman was present at the Battle of the Nile.

== Education and early military career ==
After attending Cheltenham College, Lee entered the Royal Military Academy, Woolwich. He was commissioned into the Royal Artillery as a second lieutenant on 17 February 1888. He was posted to the Far East, China, as Adjutant of the Royal Hong Kong Regiment (the Volunteers). He was promoted lieutenant on 18 February 1891. He returned to England in 1891, and was stationed on the Isle of Wight for the next two years.

== Professor at Royal Military College of Canada ==
On 18 August 1893, at the age of 24, Lee became a professor of Strategy and Tactics, at the Royal Military College of Canada, in Kingston, Ontario, with the local rank of captain. Given that only 11 to 30 cadets annually entered the College in those days, Lee would have instructed about 140 cadets in his five years at the college (1893–1898), consisting of cadet numbers 320 to 457. Cadet No. 433, future Major General Thomas Victor Anderson, D.S.O., a future Chief of Staff of the Canadian Army, recalled that Lee was known around the Royal Military College as 'The Nipper', which the cadets christened him because he used to sing George Grossmith's songs with gusto. He enjoyed riding and walking in winter across the ice to Wolfe Island, and to town. He was a regular attendant at St. George's Cathedral (Kingston, Ontario) to hear the dean Buxton Smith. When Colonel Gerald Kitson, K.R.R.C., became RMC Commandant in 1897, Captain Lee came to live with the Kitsons in the Commandant's residence. In 1894, Lee initiated a Military Survey of the Canadian Frontier, and supervised its progress until its completion in 1896. During the summer of 1897 he was a Special Correspondent for the London Daily Chronicle, covering the earlier stages of the Klondike Gold Rush, based on his travels to Alaska and the Yukon. In 1900, when Lee resigned as British Military Attaché in Washington, D.C., Colonel Kitson resigned as Commandant of RMC to take over the Washington post vacated by Lee.

== Diplomatic postings ==
He did not receive substantive promotion until the completion of his RMC appointment on 18 April 1898. Later in that year he became the British military attaché with the United States Army in Cuba during the Spanish–American War. He received the U.S. campaign medal, met Theodore Roosevelt and was made an honorary member of the 1st U.S. Volunteer Cavalry (famed as Roosevelt's "Rough Riders"). On 28 January 1899, Lee – not yet 30 years old – was appointed military attaché at the British Embassy in Washington, with the temporary rank of Lieutenant Colonel for the duration of his appointment. Although he would have preferred to have been on active service in South Africa, for the Boer War had just begun, Lee enjoyed the challenging diplomatic assignment and became a regular correspondent of Roosevelt. Theodore Roosevelt wrote of Lee: "The military attachés came out to look on-English, German, Russian, French and Japanese. With the Englishman, Captain Arthur Lee, a capital fellow, we soon struck up an especially close friendship; and we saw much of him throughout the campaign." Roosevelt also wrote: "Captain Lee, the British attaché, spent some time with us; we had begun to regard him as almost a member of the regiment." Later in life Roosevelt wrote to Rudyard Kipling and told him not to share the contents of the letter with anyone, "except Arthur Lee, to whom you are entirely at liberty to show it."

== Marriage, retirement from military ==
On 23 December 1899 Lee married Ruth Moore (died 1966), daughter of New York banker John Godfrey Moore. He had first met her at parties in Kingston and Gananoque, and had taken her to balls at the Royal Military College, Kingston. Ruth was left a substantial inheritance after her father's death shortly before the wedding. Lee was promoted brevet major on 8 August 1900, returned to regimental duty on 22 August 1900, and retired from the army on 12 December 1900.

== Politics ==
In 1900, Lee returned to England and embarked upon a political career. He was elected as a Conservative Member of Parliament for the Hampshire constituency of Fareham in the 1900 general election while still a regular officer. He represented Fareham for the next 18 years until his elevation to the peerage. He served as Civil Lord of the Admiralty from 1903 to 1905 under William Palmer, 2nd Earl of Selborne. He also continued military service during this period as a member of the Volunteer Force.

The resignation of Arthur Balfour as Conservative Prime Minister in favour of Liberal Leader, Henry Campbell-Bannerman, in 1905 and the defeat of the Conservative Party in the elections of 1906 and 1910 postponed for a decade Lee's achievement of higher office. He was Chairman of the Parliamentary Aerial Defence Committee from 1910 to 1914. He also introduced the Criminal Law Amendment Act 1912.

== First World War ==
At the beginning of the First World War Lee served as Lord Kitchener's personal commissioner to report on the Army Medical Services in France, with the rank of temporary colonel. From October 1915 he served David Lloyd George at the Ministry of Munitions, and followed him to the War Office in 1916. He was appointed Knight Commander of the Order of the Bath on 12 July 1916.

On 8 June 1917, with Lloyd George now Prime Minister, Lee became Director-General of Food Production under Rowland Prothero as President of the Board of Agriculture and Fisheries. Having then left the army he was permitted to retain the honorary rank of colonel. He was recognised for his work on 1 January 1918, being appointed Knight Grand Cross of the Order of the British Empire. He was elevated to the peerage on 9 July that year as Baron Lee of Fareham, of Chequers in the County of Buckinghamshire, shortly before he resigned as Director-General of Food Production after disagreements with Prothero. He then became a member of the House of Lords.

== Joins Cabinet ==
Lee joined the Cabinet and the Privy Council in August 1919 when he was appointed Minister of Agriculture and Fisheries, succeeding Prothero. He became First Lord of the Admiralty on 18 February 1921, and was selected as a second British delegate to attend the Washington Naval Conference, along with Arthur Balfour, later that year. He resigned from Lloyd George's government in 1922, and was promoted to Viscount Lee of Fareham, of Bridport in the County of Dorset, on 9 December that year.

== Productive from House of Lords ==
Conservative Prime Ministers Bonar Law and Stanley Baldwin, along with Labour Prime Minister Ramsay MacDonald, all benefited substantially from Viscount Lee's dedicated work during the decade of the 1920s, as Lee was not content to rest upon his laurels in the House of Lords. He went on to chair Royal Commissions on the civil service in India (1923–1924), London cross-river traffic (1926), and Police Powers and Procedure (1928). He was also Chair of the Radium Commission and of the Committee on Police Pay and Pensions (1925). He was appointed Knight Grand Commander of the Order of the Star of India on 1 January 1925, and he was promoted Knight Grand Cross of the Order of the Bath in the 1929 King's Birthday Honours. He was also appointed Knight of Grace in the Venerable Order of Saint John on 20 June 1930.

== Chequers ==
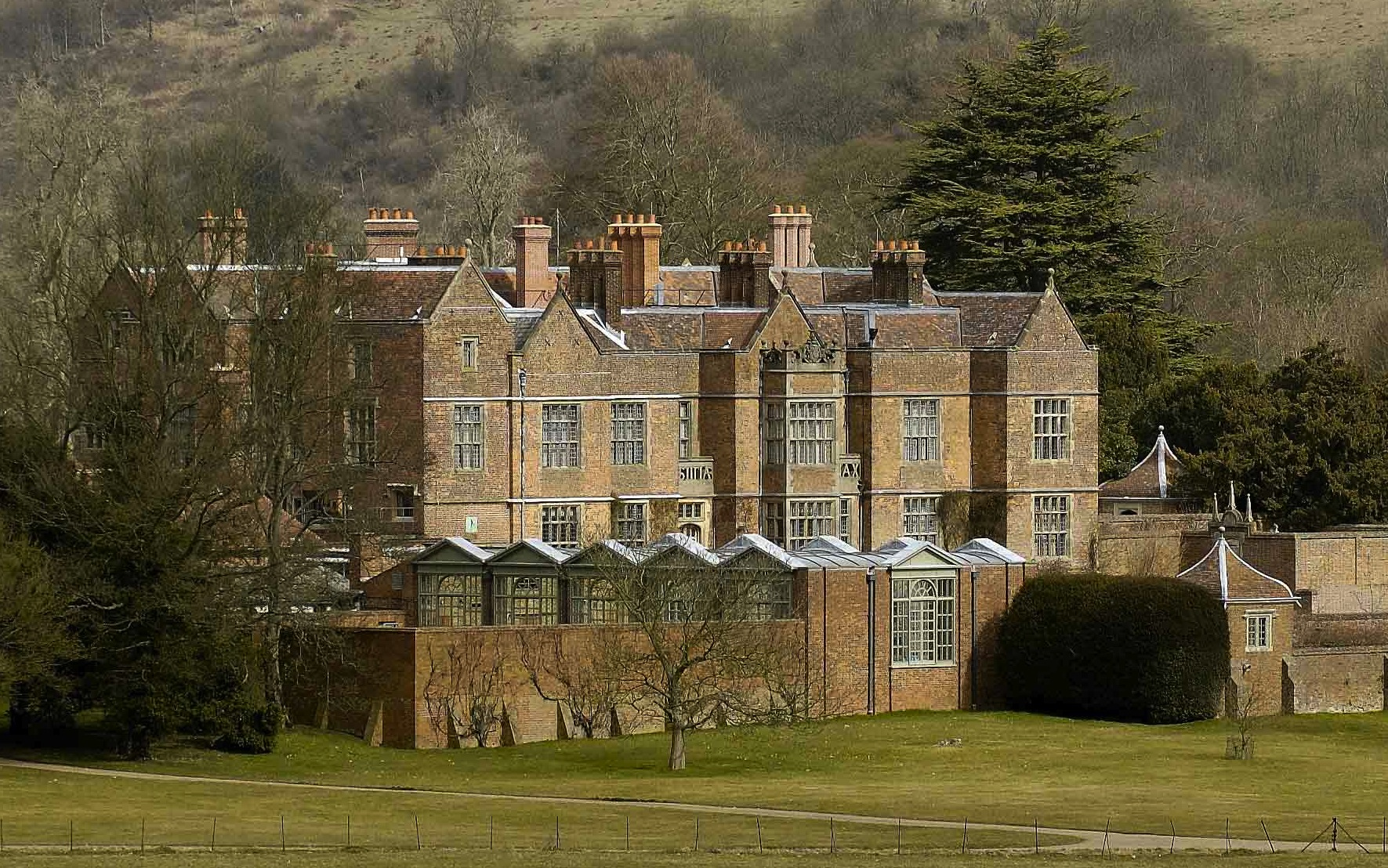
Lee's Chequers estate 1909-1921

Lee and his wife took on a long lease of Chequers, a country house and 1,000-acre (4.0 km^{2}) estate in Buckinghamshire, in 1909. The Lees bought the property in 1912 after the owner died, and began restoration. In 1917, they gave the estate, and the entire contents of the house which included a library, historical papers and manuscripts and a collection of Cromwellian portraits and artefacts, in trust to the nation to be used as the official residence and retreat of successive British Prime Ministers in perpetuity, enabled by the Chequers Estate Act 1917, the first piece of legislation to recognize the figure of a Prime Minister. The Lees left the property in January 1921, and Lloyd George was the first Prime Minister to use the property.

== Patron of the arts, and later life ==
After furnishing Chequers, Lee began a second collection. He gained the financial backing of Samuel Courtauld and Joseph Duveen, and established the Courtauld Institute of Art with the University of London. The institute, the first to offer degrees in the history of art in Britain, opened in 1932 with William George Constable as its director at Lee's request. Also with Courtauld, he persuaded the University of London to accept the transfer of the Warburg Institute from Hamburg; it was loaned to him prior to its re-establishment in 1944. He also donated a silver collection and other objects to Hart House, at the University of Toronto in Canada in 1940. In 1935 he donated a Madonna of Venetian painter Bartolomeo Vivarini (c. 1480) to Westminster Abbey.

Additionally, in the 1920s Lee was a trustee of the Wallace Collection and of the National Gallery. He served as chairman of the latter in 1931–2, and was a member of the Royal Fine Art Commission from 26 May 1926 until his death.

Between 1917 and 1939 Lee was President of Cheltenham College.

Lee wrote his autobiography, entitled A Good Innings in 1941, and this was privately published in three volumes that year. It was later republished by his good friend Alan Clark, also a Conservative politician, for publisher J. Murray in 1974 (see below).

== Death ==
Lord Lee died at Old Quarries, a grade II listed building in Avening, Gloucestershire, in 1947. He had no children and his viscountcy became extinct upon his death.

His widow, Viscountess Lee, presented to the Royal Military College of Canada Museum a silver-headed walking stick of her late husband, which he had used daily at RMC fifty-four years earlier. The stick has two silver bands listing the places where Lee served, or visited, between 1888 and 1904, which include the Royal Military College of Canada. Lady Lee also presented the RMC Museum with three photographs of Lord Lee –- two of them taken in Kingston, one in uniform in 1893, and the other in 1896 wearing a checked suit, silver-topped stick in hand. The third is a photograph of the portrait by Herbert James Gunn in full regalia of a Knight Grand Cross of the Most Honourable Order of the Bath.

== Bibliography ==
- Lee of Fareham, Viscount; Clark, Alan (1974). A Good Innings; The Private Papers of Viscount Lee of Fareham. London: J. Murray. ISBN 0-7195-2850-X.
- Baddeley, V. W.; Brodie, Marc (January 2008). "Lee, Arthur Hamilton, Viscount Lee of Fareham (1868–1947)". Oxford Dictionary of National Biography (online ed.). Oxford University Press. doi:10.1093/ref:odnb/34466. (Subscription, Wikipedia Library access or UK public library membership required.)
- Hesilrige, Arthur G. M. (1921). Debrett's Peerage and Titles of courtesy. 160A, Fleet street, London, UK: Dean & Son. p. 549.

Parliament of the United Kingdom
Preceded by Sir Frederick Fitzwygram	Member of Parliament for Fareham; 1900–1918	Succeeded by Sir John Humphrey Davidson
Political offices
Preceded by Rowland Edmund Prothero as President of the Board of Agriculture and Fisheries	Minister of Agriculture and Fisheries; 1919–1921	Succeeded by Arthur Griffith-Boscawen
Preceded by Walter Long	First Lord of the Admiralty; 1921–1922	Succeeded by Leopold Stennett Amery
Peerage of the United Kingdom
New creation	Viscount Lee of Fareham; 1922–1947	Extinct
New creation	Baron Lee of Fareham; 1918–1947	Extinct
