= Bethnal Green and Bow (electoral division) =

Electoral division in Greater London, 1973–1986

- Former electoral division for the Greater London Council
- Bethnal Green and Bow electoral division boundaries
- District: Tower Hamlets
- Electorate: 55,242 (1973); 51,172 (1977); 51,159 (1981)
- Area: 810 hectares (8.1 km^{2})

Former electoral division
- Created: 1973
- Abolished: 1986
- Member: 1
- Created from: Tower Hamlets

Bethnal Green and Bow was an electoral division for the purposes of elections to the Greater London Council. The constituency elected one councillor for a four-year term in 1973, 1977 and 1981, with the final term extended for an extra year ahead of the abolition of the Greater London Council.

== History ==
It was planned to use the same boundaries as the Westminster Parliament constituencies for election of councillors to the Greater London Council (GLC), as had been the practice for elections to the predecessor London County Council, but those that existed in 1965 crossed the Greater London boundary. Until new constituencies could be settled, the 32 London boroughs were used as electoral areas. The London Borough of Tower Hamlets formed the Tower Hamlets electoral division. This was used for the Greater London Council elections in 1964, 1967 and 1970.

The new constituencies were settled following the Second Periodic Review of Westminster constituencies and the new electoral division matched the boundaries of the Bethnal Green and Bow parliamentary constituency.

The area was in a long-term period of population decline that was yet to reverse. The electorate reduced from 55,242 in 1973 to 51,159 in 1981. It covered an area of 810 hectares (8.1 km^{2}).

== Elections ==
The Bethnal Green and Bow constituency was used for the Greater London Council elections in 1973, 1977 and 1981. One councillor was elected at each election using first-past-the-post voting.

=== 1973 election ===
The fourth election to the GLC (and first using revised boundaries) was held on 12 April 1973. The electorate was 55,242 and one Labour Party councillor was elected. The turnout was 22.0%. The councillor was elected for a three-year term. This was extended for an extra year in 1976 when the electoral cycle was switched to four-yearly.

1973 Greater London Council election: Bethnal Green and Bow
Party	Candidate	Votes	%	±%
Labour	Ernest Ashley Bramall	10,802	88.78	
Conservative	L. E. Smith	899	7.39	
Independent	J. P. Collins	467	3.84	
Turnout				
Labour win (new seat)				

=== 1977 election ===
The fifth election to the GLC (and second using revised boundaries) was held on 5 May 1977. The electorate was 51,172 and one Labour Party councillor was elected. The turnout was 28.7%. The councillor was elected for a four-year term.

1977 Greater London Council election: Bethnal Green and Bow
Party	Candidate	Votes	%	±%
Labour	Ernest Ashley Bramall	8,064	54.99	
Conservative	John O'Beirne Ranelagh	3,090	21.07	
National Front	W. E. Castleton	2,811	19.17	
International Marxist	C. M. B. Weingarten	354	2.41	
GLC Abolitionist Campaign	G. Lewis	345	2.35	
Turnout				
Labour hold		Swing		

=== 1981 election ===
The sixth and final election to the GLC (and third using revised boundaries) was held on 7 May 1981. The electorate was 51,159 and one Labour Party councillor was elected. The turnout was 37.9%. The councillor was elected for a four-year term, extended by an extra year by the Local Government (Interim Provisions) Act 1984, ahead of the abolition of the council.

1981 Greater London Council election: Bethnal Green and Bow
Party	Candidate	Votes	%	±%
Labour	Ernest Ashley Bramall	9,162	47.25	
Liberal	Brian Williams	7,591	39.14	
Conservative	Christopher W. Nolan	1,230	6.34	
National Front	Victor J. Clark	755	3.89	
NFCM	Alan J. Wilkens	257	1.33	
East London Workers Against Racism	Fran Eden	211	1.09	
Workers Revolutionary	Angela Mitchell	185	0.95	
Turnout				
Labour hold		Swing		
