= Godfrey Mitchell =

British engineer (1891–1982)

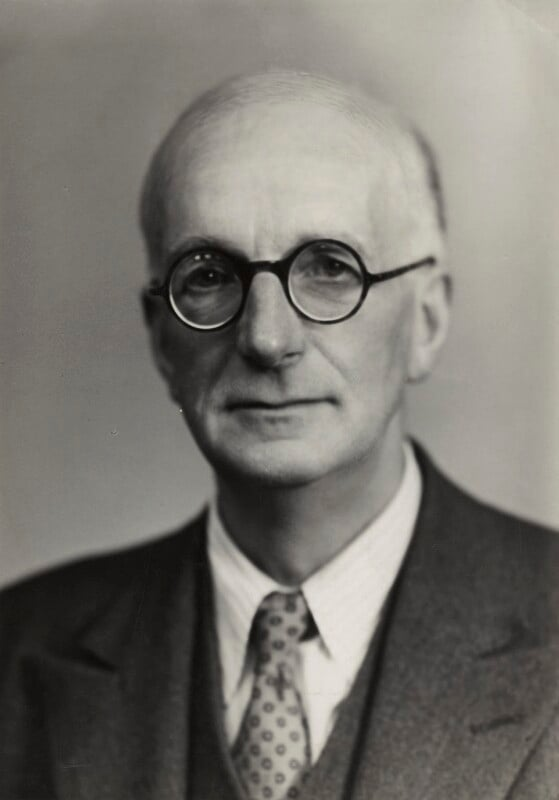
Mitchell in 1949

Sir Godfrey Way Mitchell (31 October 1891 – 9 December 1982) was a construction engineer and entrepreneur who built up George Wimpey into a thriving business.

== Career ==
Born in Peckham and educated at Haberdashers' Aske's School at Hatcham, Godfrey Mitchell joined Rowe & Mitchell, his father's quarrying business on Alderney on leaving school. He was given a temporary commission in the Royal Engineers in 1916 and served in France.

On demobilisation he returned to England and acquired George Wimpey turning it from a small construction company into a thriving business that exploited the need for new housing after World War I. He was Chairman of the Company from 1930 to 1973 and Life President from 1973 until his death.

Dartford by-election, 1938
Party	Candidate	Votes	%	±%
Labour	Jennie Adamson	46,514	52.4	
Conservative	Godfrey Mitchell	42,276	47.6	
Majority		4,238	4.8	N/A
Turnout		88,790	68.0	
Labour gain from Conservative		Swing		

A keen amateur cricketer, he also served as Master of the Worshipful Company of Paviors in 1948.

Godfrey Mitchell was knighted in 1948. In 1957 he became a member of the Restrictive Practices Court.

He died in Beaconsfield in 1982.

== Family ==
In 1929 he married Doreen Lilian and together they went on to have two daughters.

He was the uncle of Nobel Prize winner Peter D. Mitchell.
