= Reginald Bennett =

British politician (1911–2000)

Sir Reginald Frederick Brittain Bennett (Sheffield, 22 July 1911 – London, 19 December 2000) was a Conservative Party politician, international yachtsman, psychiatrist and painter.

== Education ==
Bennett was educated at Winchester College and New College, Oxford.

== Military service ==
He was in the RNVR from 1934 to 1946.

== Personal life ==
Bennett married Henrietta Crane in 1947: they had one son and three daughters. Lady Bennett died in 2018.

== Sporting achievements ==
He was a helmsman of Shamrock V 1934-35 and was in the British America's Cup team in 1949 and 1953. He founded the Imperial Poona Yacht Club in 1934 as a light-hearted club for serious sailors; events include sailing backwards.

== Political career ==
Bennett contested Woolwich East at the 1937 London County Council election, and the equivalent seat at the 1945 United Kingdom general election, but was not elected. He was Member of Parliament for Gosport and Fareham from 1950 to 1974, and after boundary changes, for Fareham from 1974 to 1979. He was Parliamentary Private Secretary to Iain Macleod 1956–63 and chaired the Parliamentary and Scientific Committee 1959–62. He was also chairman of the catering committee.

== Offices held ==
Parliament of the United Kingdom
New constituency	Member of Parliament for Gosport & Fareham; 1950 – February 1974	Constituency abolished
New constituency	Member of Parliament for Fareham; February 1974 – 1979	Succeeded by Peter Lloyd
