= George Evatt =

British Army officer and military doctor

Major-General Sir George Evatt KCB
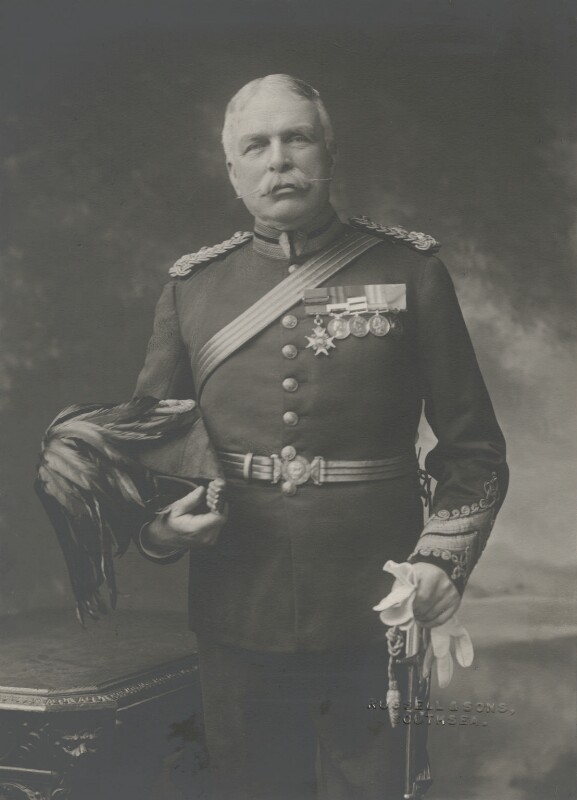
- Evatt in 1918
- Born: 11 November 1843; Ireland
- Died: 5 November 1921 (aged 77); London, England
- Relatives: H. V. Evatt (nephew); Clive Evatt (nephew)
- Military career
- Allegiance: United Kingdom
- Branch: British Army
- Service years: 1865–1903
- Rank: Major-General
- Conflicts: Perak War; Second Anglo-Afghan War; Mahdist War
- Awards: Knight Commander of the Order of the Bath

Major-General Sir George Joseph Hamilton Evatt KCB (11 November 1843 – 5 November 1921) was a British Army officer and military doctor. He served overseas in the Perak War, Second Anglo-Afghan War, and Mahdist War, but was better known for his writings on military medicine and his lobbying for the creation of the Royal Army Medical Corps.

== Early life ==
Evatt was born in Ireland, the oldest of seven children born to Mary Anne (née Farrell) and Captain George Joseph Evatt of the 70th (Surrey) Regiment of Foot. His father died in 1858 while on duty in Peshawar, India. Evatt studied medicine at Trinity College Dublin and Queen's University Belfast, obtaining his Doctor of Medicine degree from the latter in 1863. He subsequently studied surgery with the Royal College of Surgeons in Ireland.

== Military career ==
Evatt enlisted in the army in 1865, with the rank of assistant-surgeon in the 25th Regiment of Foot. He saw active service for the first time in the Perak War of 1875. A few years later, he was twice mentioned in dispatches during the Second Anglo-Afghan War, serving under General Sir Charles Gough. He participated in the Battle of Ali Masjid, the Bazar Valley expedition, the relief of Sherpur, and the advance on Kabul, organising multiple field hospitals.

From 1880 to 1886, Evatt was a medical officer at the Royal Military Academy, Woolwich. His time there was interrupted by his service in the Mahdist War, where he participated in the Battle of Tamai and the Suakin Expedition. He was awarded the Khedive's Star. Evatt was stationed in British India from 1887 to 1891, where he was the senior medical officer at Quetta. During that time he was a member of the Zhob Valley expedition of 1890. He returned to England in 1892 as the chief sanitary officer at the Royal Artillery Barracks, and in 1894 was appointed secretary to the Netley Hospital.

Evatt was promoted to surgeon-colonel in 1896, and from then until 1899 served as the principal medical officer at Hong Kong. He was promoted to surgeon-general in November 1899, and until his retirement in 1903 – on his 60th birthday – was the principal medical officer for the Western District, based at Salisbury.

Evatt's obituary in the British Medical Journal observed that he would be "chiefly remembered for his persistent advocacy of the formation of the medical officers of the army into a Corps". His efforts in that regard began at least as early as 1884, when he read a paper to the Royal United Services Institute calling for a series of reforms. The Royal Army Medical Corps (RAMC) was eventually established in 1898. When the Royal Army Medical College opened in 1907, Evatt was one of four officers whose names were placed on a memorial dedicated to those who had been instrumental in the creation of the RAMC.

== Other interests ==
Evatt was a member of the Liberal Party and stood unsuccessfully on three occasions for the House of Commons. He first ran for parliament in Woolwich at the 1886 election, where he lost to the Conservative candidate Edwin Hughes by a significant margin. This was despite his candidacy being endorsed by Florence Nightingale, with whom he had corresponded on a number of occasions. In 1917, after her death, he wrote a reminiscence of her for The Journal of the Royal Artillery. After retiring from the military, Evatt ran in Fareham where Bertha Bowness Fischer was briefly his agent. He contested the 1906 election in Fareham and in Brighton he was at the January 1910 election; he did not come close to being elected on either occasion.

Evatt was a prolific writer. He contributed numerous articles to the British Medical Journal, and served on the council of the British Medical Association for a period; in 1896 he was the president of the organisation's Hong Kong branch. He also served on the committee of the International Health Exhibition of 1884.

== Personal life ==
In 1887, Evatt married Sophie Marie Frances Kerr – a niece of Field Marshal William Maynard Gomm, a granddaughter of Major-General Lord Robert Kerr, and a great-granddaughter of William Kerr, 5th Marquess of Lothian. The couple had two children together: Sophie Estelle Kerr Evatt (b. 1878; known as Ettie), who was born in Faizabad, India, and George Raleigh Kerr Evatt (b. 1883; known as Raleigh), who was born in Woolwich. His son followed him into the army, but was killed in action near Armentières, France, in November 1914. Evatt's nephews via his brother John included the Australian politicians H. V. Evatt and Clive Evatt. He entertained two more of John's sons, Frank and Ray, while they were on leave in London during World War I; both were subsequently killed in action.

== Honours ==
- Companion of the Order of the Bath – 26 June 1903
- Knight Commander of the Order of the Bath – 1 January 1919
- Honorary Colonel of the Home Counties Division, Royal Army Medical Corps
