= John Davidson (British Army officer) =

British Army general and politician (1876–1954)

Major-General Sir John Davidson KCMG CB DSO
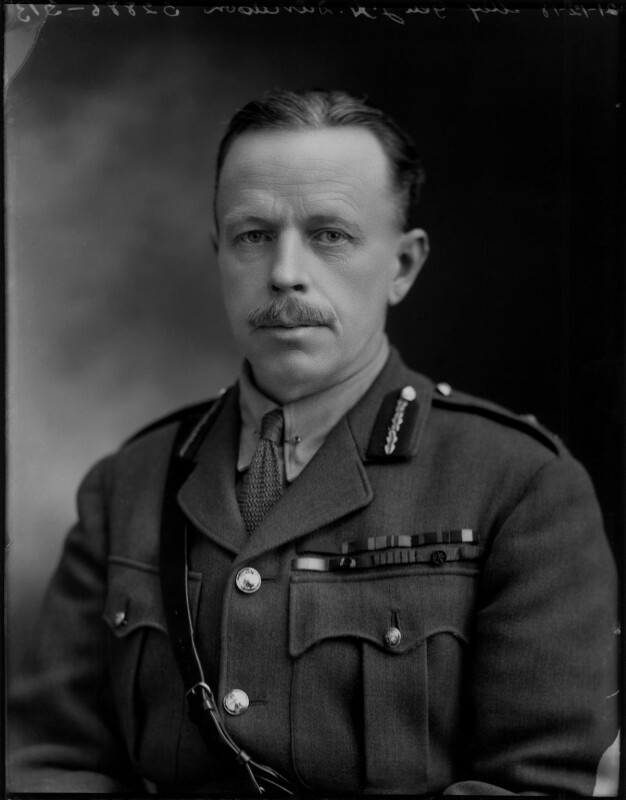
- Davidson in 1918
- Born: 24 July 1876; Mauritius
- Died: 11 December 1954 (aged 78); Daviot, Aberdeenshire, Scotland
- Military career
- Allegiance: United Kingdom
- Branch: British Army
- Service years: 1893–1922
- Rank: Major-General
- Nickname: "Tavish"
- Unit: King's Royal Rifle Corps
- Conflicts: Second Boer War: Battle of Talana Hill; Battle of Ladysmith; First World War: First Battle of the Marne; First Battle of the Aisne; First Battle of Ypres; Battle of Neuve Chapelle; Battle of Loos; Second Battle of Artois
- Awards: Knight Commander of the Order of St Michael and St George; Companion of the Order of the Bath; Distinguished Service Order; Mentioned in Despatches; Chevalier of the Legion of Honour (France)

Major-General Sir John Humphrey Davidson, KCMG, CB, DSO (24 July 1876 – 11 December 1954), nicknamed "Tavish", was a British Army officer and Member of Parliament.

== Early life ==
Davidson was born in Mauritius to George Walter Davidson, a merchant, and his wife Johanna, and some time before 1890 they moved back to England. From 1890 Davidson was educated at Harrow School, then at the Royal Military College, Sandhurst, after he left Harrow in 1893.

== Early military career ==
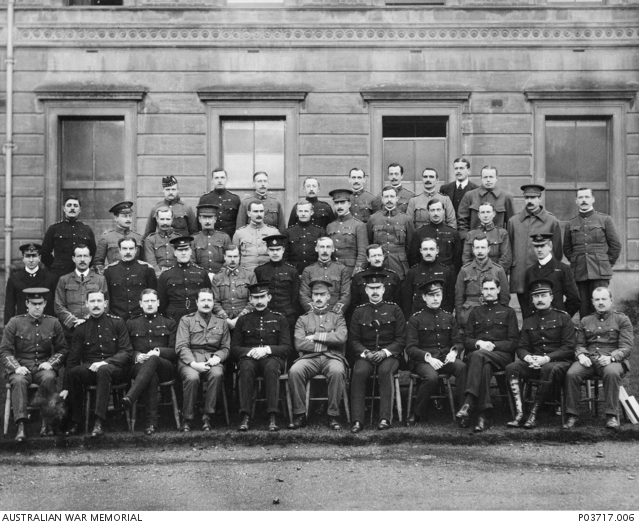
Group portrait of officers at the British Staff College at Camberley, England, 1906. Davidson, then a captain, is stood in the back row, first on the right.

Davidson graduated in 1896 and joined the 1st Battalion the King's Royal Rifle Corps as a second lieutenant on 28 March 1896. He was promoted to lieutenant on 15 October 1898, and a year later the Corps had been transferred to Cape Colony, where they were directly involved in the Second Boer War. With his Regiment he took part in the Battle of Talana Hill and the Battle of Ladysmith before he was attached to the Army Service Corps. He was promoted to captain on 25 October 1901, and in late December that year he was seconded for service as Adjutant of the Damant's Horse, a local cavalry unit, with the objective of disrupting Boer commando units. He was mentioned in despatches and appointed a Companion of the Distinguished Service Order (DSO) for his war service.

After the end of the Boer War he returned to a regular posting with his regiment in August 1902, and was appointed regimental Adjutant of the 1st Battalion on 3 September 1902. He left South Africa with other men of his battalion on the SS Sardinia in September 1902. Arriving at Malta the following month, he was engaged in Imperial garrison service there and at Crete before being accepted into the Staff College, Camberley in 1905. After graduation he served in a variety of positions as a staff officer, including as director of training at the War Office from 1908 to 1910, followed by two years as a staff major with the 5th Infantry Brigade. In April 1912 he was transferred back to the Staff College, this time as an instructor, graded as a GSO2, taking over from Colonel Robert Whigham and holding the temporary rank of major whilst so employed.

== First World War ==
After the outbreak of the First World War, Davidson joined the III Corps of the British Expeditionary Force (BEF) as a staff officer and participated in the First Battle of the Marne, First Battle of the Aisne and the First Battle of Ypres. After the formation of the First Army in 1915 he became the operations officer for General Sir Douglas Haig, the army commander. As operations officer Davidson was the principal organiser of the Battle of Neuve Chapelle, Battle of Loos and the Second Battle of Artois. After Haig became commander-in-chief of the BEF on the Western Front, Davidson's star was in the ascendant as a part of Haig's inner circle and he was appointed to the post of director of military operations at the BEF's general headquarters (GHQ), one of the key posts controlling activities on the Western Front during the war. In 1916 he was made a Chevalier of the Legion of Honour and in 1917 he was appointed a Companion of the Order of the Bath. During the planning of the initial attack at the Battle of Passchendaele, he urged more limited advances with regard to tactical objectives so as to increase the concentration of British artillery fire and leave the British attacking forces less vulnerable to German counter-attack, but his advice was not followed.

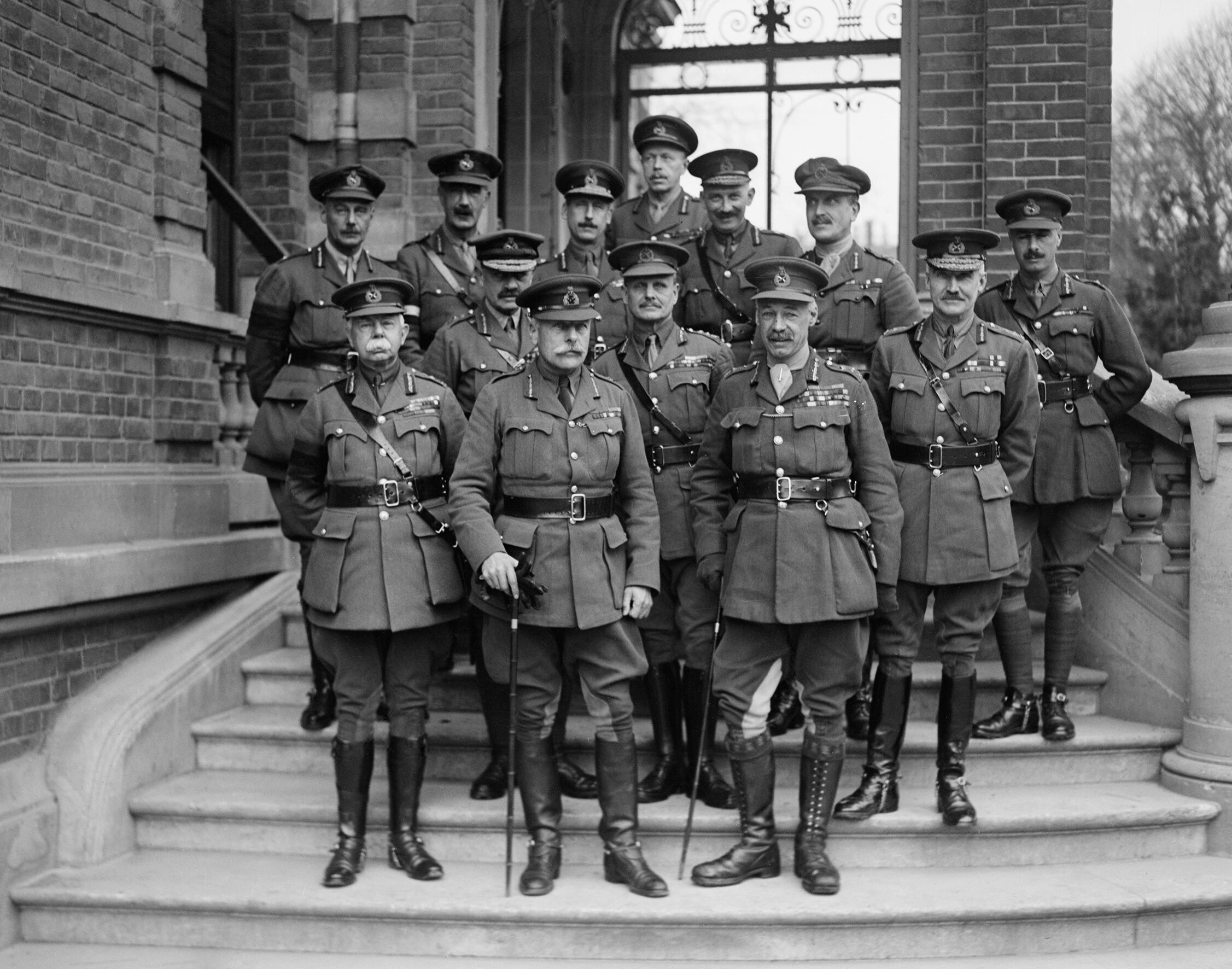
Field Marshal Sir Douglas Haig (centre front) with his senior commanders and staff officers at Cambrai, France, November 1918. Stood in the back row is Major General Davidson.

Ahead of the German Michael offensive in March 1918 Davidson, who had been promoted to major general in January 1917, advised General Sir Hubert Gough, commander of the BEF's Fifth Army, that he could overcome his lack of men by "skillful handling of rearguards". Gough was irritated by this.

On 6 April, with the German Georgette Offensive imminent, he was sent on a mission to Beauvais to attempt to persuade Ferdinand Foch to take over the British line as far north as the Somme, to send French reserves behind British line at Vimy Ridge, or to conduct a major French offensive. Foch, concerned at the risk of a German attack in the French sector, refused, although he offered to participate in a joint Anglo-French offensive near Amiens.

In the spring of 1918 Davidson was promoted to control both Intelligence (formerly the empire of Haig's alleged eminence grise John Charteris and now under Brigadier General Edgar Cox), and Operations ("Oa", now under the future CIGS Brigadier General John Dill).

Ahead of the Bluecher Offensive, Haig later claimed that he and Davidson had repeatedly warned of the dangers of a German attack along the Chemin des Dames, but that their warnings were brushed aside by Foch, Maxime Weygand and de Barescut. No evidence had been found to substantiate this claim.

In 1919 Davidson was appointed and knighted as a Knight Commander of the Order of St Michael and St George.

== Later life ==
Davidson left the army in 1922, and immediately stood for Parliament as a Conservative. He was returned for Fareham, and took an active role in the House of Commons' Army Committee. He stood down from the Commons in 1931 to concentrate on his business interests, including a seat on the Vickers-Armstrongs board and a position as Chairman of the Bank of Australia between 1937 and 1945. In the early 1950s he published the book 'Haig: Master of the Field, comprising a defence of the British Army General Headquarters' conduct of the Western Front campaign in 1917–1918.

Davidson died at the age of 78 at Daviot in Aberdeenshire, Scotland, on 11 December 1954.

== Publications ==
- Haig, Master of the Field (1953).

== Books ==
- Harris, J. P. Douglas Haig and the First World War. Cambridge, Cambridge University Press, 2008. ISBN 978-0-521-89802-7
- Kitchen, Martin (2001). The German Offensives of 1918. Stroud: Tempus. ISBN 978-0-7524-1799-8.

Parliament of the United Kingdom
Preceded by Arthur Lee	Member of Parliament for Fareham; 1918–1931	Succeeded by Thomas Inskip
