= Thomas Inskip, 1st Viscount Caldecote =

British Conservative politician (1876–1947)

The Right Honourable The Viscount Caldecote CBE PC
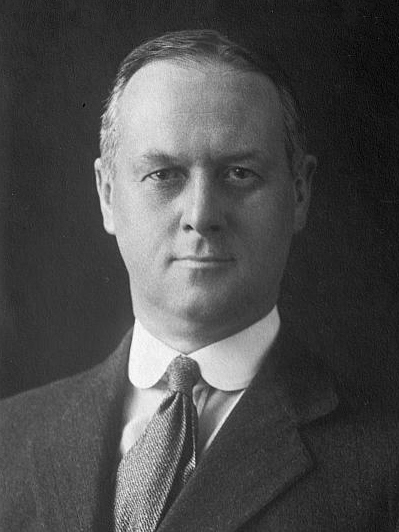
- Inskip in 1923

Lord Chief Justice of England
- In office 14 October 1940 – 23 January 1946
- Monarch: George VI
- Preceded by: The Viscount Hewart
- Succeeded by: The Lord Goddard

Lord Chancellor
- In office 3 September 1939 – 12 May 1940
- Monarch: George VI
- Prime Minister: Neville Chamberlain
- Preceded by: The Lord Maugham
- Succeeded by: The Viscount Simon

Leader of the House of Lords
- In office 14 May 1940 – 3 October 1940
- Prime Minister: Winston Churchill
- Preceded by: The Earl Stanhope
- Succeeded by: The Viscount Halifax
Ministerial offices 1922–1940
Secretary of State for Dominion Affairs
In office 14 May 1940 – 3 October 1940
Prime Minister	Winston Churchill
Preceded by	Anthony Eden
Succeeded by	Viscount Cranborne
In office 29 January 1939 – 3 September 1939
Prime Minister	Neville Chamberlain
Preceded by	Malcolm MacDonald
Succeeded by	Anthony Eden
Minister for Coordination of Defence
In office 13 March 1936 – 29 January 1939
Prime Minister	Stanley Baldwin; Neville Chamberlain
Preceded by	New Office
Succeeded by	The Lord Chatfield
Attorney General for England and Wales
In office 26 January 1932 – 18 March 1936
Prime Minister	Ramsay MacDonald; Stanley Baldwin
Preceded by	William Jowitt
Succeeded by	Donald Somervell
In office 28 March 1928 – 4 June 1929
Prime Minister	Stanley Baldwin
Preceded by	Douglas Hogg
Succeeded by	William Jowitt
Solicitor General for England and Wales
In office 3 September 1931 – 26 January 1932
Prime Minister	Ramsay MacDonald
Preceded by	Stafford Cripps
Succeeded by	Boyd Merriman
In office 11 November 1924 – 28 March 1928
Prime Minister	Stanley Baldwin
Preceded by	Henry Slesser
Succeeded by	Boyd Merriman
In office 31 October 1922 – 22 January 1924
Prime Minister	Bonar Law; Stanley Baldwin
Preceded by	Leslie Scott
Succeeded by	Henry Slesser

Member of the House of Lords Lord Temporal
- In office 7 September 1939 – 11 October 1947; Hereditary Peerage
- Preceded by: Peerage created
- Succeeded by: The 2nd Viscount Caldecote

Member of Parliament for Fareham
- In office 20 February 1931 – 6 September 1939
- Preceded by: John Davidson
- Succeeded by: Dymoke White

Member of Parliament for Bristol Central
- In office 14 December 1918 – 30 May 1929
- Preceded by: constituency established
- Succeeded by: Joseph Alpass

Personal details
- Born: Thomas Walker Hobart Inskip; 5 March 1876 Clifton, Bristol, England
- Died: 11 October 1947 (aged 71) Godalming, Surrey, England
- Party: Conservative
- Spouse: Lady Augusta Boyle
- Education: King's College, Cambridge

Thomas Walker Hobart Inskip, 1st Viscount Caldecote, CBE, PC (5 March 1876 – 11 October 1947) was a British Conservative politician who served in many legal posts, culminating in serving as Lord Chancellor from 1939 until 1940. Despite legal posts dominating his career for all but four years, he is most prominently remembered for serving as Minister for Coordination of Defence from 1936 until 1939.

== Background and education ==
Inskip was the son of James Inskip, a solicitor, by his second wife Constance Sophia Louisa, daughter of John Hampden. The Right Reverend James Inskip was his elder half-brother and Sir John Hampden Inskip, Lord Mayor of Bristol, his younger brother. He attended Clifton College from 1886 to 1894 and King's College, Cambridge, from 1894 to 1897. He joined Clifton RFC in 1895–96. In 1899 he was called to the Bar by the Inner Temple.

== Political and legal career ==
Inskip became a King's Counsel in 1914. He served in the Intelligence Division from 1915 and from 1918 to 1919 worked at the Admiralty as head of the Naval Law branch. From 1920 to 1922, he served as Chancellor of the Diocese of Truro. In 1918 he entered Parliament as Member of Parliament (MP) for Bristol Central. He was first appointed Solicitor General in 1922 and would hold this post for the next six years, with one short interruption for the Labour government of 1924. In 1922 he was knighted.

A staunch Protestant, he opposed the 1926 Roman Catholic Relief Act. His beliefs came to national attention when in 1927 he joined with the Home Secretary Sir William Joynson-Hicks in attacking the proposed new version of the Book of Common Prayer. The law required Parliament to approve such revisions, normally regarded as a formality, but when the Prayer Book came before the House of Commons Inskip argued strongly against its adoption, for he felt it strayed far from the Protestant principles of the Church of England. The debate on the Prayer Book is regarded as one of the most eloquent ever seen in the Commons, and resulted in the rejection of the Prayer Book. A revised version was submitted in 1928 but rejected again. However, the Church Assembly then declared an emergency, and used this as a pretext to use the new Prayer Book for many decades afterwards.

In 1928 Inskip was promoted to Attorney General, which post he held until the following year's general election – in which he lost his Bristol seat. When Ramsay MacDonald formed his National Government in 1931, Inskip, who had been elected in a by-election for Fareham in February that year, returned to the role of Solicitor General but the following year a vacancy occurred and he once more resumed his work as Attorney General. He was sworn of the Privy Council in 1932. In 1935 he prosecuted the 26th Baron de Clifford for manslaughter, which was the last ever criminal trial of a peer in the House of Lords.

Despite an exclusively legal track record, on 13 March 1936 Inskip became the first Minister for Coordination of Defence. His appointment to this particular office was highly controversial. Winston Churchill (who said he "had the advantage of being little known and knowing nothing about military subjects") had long campaigned for such an office and when its creation was announced, most expected Churchill to be appointed. When Inskip was named, one famous reaction was that "This is the most cynical appointment since Caligula made his horse a consul". John Gunther, who described Inskip in 1940 as "the sixty-three-year-old man of mystery", reported the "cruel story" that Prime Minister Stanley Baldwin wanted to appoint someone "'even less brilliant than himself'". Collin Brooks castigated Inskip in his diary as "a second-rate Attorney General." His appointment is now regarded as a sign of caution by Baldwin who did not wish to appoint someone like Churchill, because it would have been interpreted by foreign powers as a sign of the United Kingdom preparing for war. Baldwin anyway wished to avoid taking onboard such a controversial and radical minister as Churchill.

Inskip's tenure as Minister for Coordination of Defence remains controversial, with some arguing that he did much to push Britain's rearmament before the outbreak of the Second World War, but others arguing he was largely ineffectual, although his ministry "had no real powers and little staff". In early 1939 he was replaced by the former First Sea Lord, Admiral of the Fleet Lord Chatfield, and moved to become Secretary of State for Dominion Affairs. At the outbreak of war in 1939 he was raised to the peerage as Viscount Caldecote, of Bristol in the County of Gloucester, and made Lord Chancellor, but in May 1940 he once more became Secretary of State for Dominion Affairs to make room for the marginalising of Sir John Simon in the new war ministry of Winston Churchill. After leaving ministerial office Inskip served as Lord Chief Justice of England from 1940 until 1946. As of 9 October 2026, he remains the last Lord Chief Justice to have held a ministerial office before his appointment.

Inskip was referred to in the book Guilty Men by Michael Foot, Frank Owen and Peter Howard (writing under the pseudonym 'Cato'), published in 1940 as an attack on public figures for their failure to re-arm and their appeasement of Nazi Germany.

== Family ==
Lord Caldecote married Lady Augusta Helen Elizabeth, daughter of David Boyle, 7th Earl of Glasgow and widow of Charles Lindsay Orr-Ewing, in 1914. He died in October 1947, aged 71, and was succeeded by his son, Robert (Robin) Andrew in the viscountcy. Lady Caldecote died in May 1967, aged 90.

== In popular culture ==
In the 1981 Granada Television series Lady Killers, Inskip was played by Noel Johnson in an episode entitled "The Darlingest Boy". He was also portrayed by Peter Vaughan in Winston Churchill: The Wilderness Years, also in 1981.

== Arms ==
Coat of arms of Thomas Inskip, 1st Viscount Caldecote
Crest Upon the battlements of a tower a grouse's leg erased Proper. Escutcheon Per chevron Azure and Argent in chief two crosses pate Or and in base an eagled displayed of the first. Supporters On the dexter side a talbot and on the sinister side a pegasus Proper each charged on the shoulder with a garb Or. Motto Be Careful

Parliament of the United Kingdom
New constituency	Member of Parliament for Bristol Central; 1918–1929	Succeeded by Joseph Herbert Alpass
Preceded by Sir John Humphrey Davidson	Member of Parliament for Fareham; 1931–1939	Succeeded by Sir Rudolph Dymoke White
Legal offices
Preceded by Sir Leslie Scott	Solicitor General; 1922–1924	Succeeded by Sir Henry Slesser
Preceded by Sir Henry Slesser	Solicitor General; 1924–1928	Succeeded by Sir Frank Merriman
Preceded by Douglas Hogg	Attorney General; 1928–1929	Succeeded by William Jowitt
Preceded by Sir Stafford Cripps	Solicitor General; 1931-1932	Succeeded by Sir Frank Merriman
Preceded by William Jowitt	Attorney General; 1932–1936	Succeeded by Sir Donald Somervell
Preceded by The Viscount Hewart	Lord Chief Justice of England; 1940–1946	Succeeded by The Lord Goddard
Political offices
New office	Minister for Coordination of Defence; 1936–1939	Succeeded by Ernle Chatfield
Preceded by Malcolm MacDonald	Secretary of State for Dominion Affairs; 1939	Succeeded by Anthony Eden
Preceded by The Lord Maugham	Lord High Chancellor of Great Britain; 1939–1940	Succeeded by The Viscount Simon
Preceded by Anthony Eden	Secretary of State for Dominion Affairs; 1940	Succeeded by Viscount Cranborne
Preceded by The Earl Stanhope	Leader of the House of Lords; 1940	Succeeded by The Viscount Halifax
Party political offices
Preceded by The Earl Stanhope	Leader of the Conservative Party in the House of Lords; 1940	Succeeded by The Viscount Halifax
Peerage of the United Kingdom
New creation	Viscount Caldecote; 1939–1947	Succeeded by Robert Andrew Inskip
