= Bertha Bowness Fischer =

British political agent

- Born: 21 February 1875; Karaikal, French India
- Died: 6 December 1920 (aged 45)
- Known for: First UK woman political agent

Bertha Bowness Fischer born Bertha Bowness Foulkes (21 February 1875 – 6 December 1920) was a British political agent.

== Life ==
Fischer was born in Karaikal in 1875. Her family came originally from Germany but the she was a fourth generation person born in India. She was born in a part of India that was part of French India where her father, Thomas James Henry Bowness Fischer, was a British consular agent. Her mother was Henrietta Amelia who was born Stevenson. She was her parents second daughter born in Kariakal. Her father had briefly worked for the British East India Company but all of their interests were transferred to Britain after the 1857 disruptions.

In 1902 she was accepted by Society of Certified and Associated Liberal Agents as a political agent. She was the first woman of any party to qualified in this way. This job carries a similar status to being a solicitor and the first woman solicitor was not until after 1919.

In 1905 she became the second women constituency political agent when she was given that job in Fareham. She was supporting the Liberal candidate, George Evatt, in what was a Conservative seat. She left to marry Eton-educated surgeon Captain (Thomas) Howard Foulkes FRCS in Portsea in July 1905 leaving her job as political agent and a poor law guardian.

== Death and legacy ==
Fischer was murdered in 1920. She and her husband were attacked by Pathan tribesmen in their bungalow on 15 November and her husband, who was now a Lieutenant Colonel, was killed. She survived the attack but died of her wounds on 6 December 1920. A plaque was created by their friends in India and it is now in the National Army Museum. The Liberal Democrats give an award in her name.
