= 1946 Bexley by-election =

UK Parliamentary by-election

The 1946 Bexley by-election was held on 22 July 1946. The by-election was held due to the resignation of the incumbent Labour MP, Jennie Adamson, upon nomination as deputy chairman of the Unemployment Assistance Board. It was won by the Labour candidate Ashley Bramall, with a much reduced majority.

Bexley by-election, 1946
Party	Candidate	Votes	%	±%
Labour	Ashley Bramall	19,759	52.46	−4.47
Conservative	J. C. Lockwood	17,908	47.54	+17.74
Majority		1,851	4.91	−22.22
Turnout		37,667	62.6	−14.0
Labour hold		Swing	-11.1	
