= Stepney and Poplar (electoral division) =

Electoral division in Greater London, 1973–1986

- Former electoral division for the Greater London Council
- District: Tower Hamlets
- Electorate: 60,334 (1973); 59,799 (1977); 59,997 (1981)
- Area: 1,164 hectares (11.64 km^{2})

Former electoral division
- Created: 1973
- Abolished: 1986
- Member: 1
- Created from: Tower Hamlets

Stepney and Poplar was an electoral division for the purposes of elections to the Greater London Council. The constituency elected one councillor for a four-year term in 1973, 1977 and 1981, with the final term extended for an extra year ahead of the abolition of the Greater London Council.

== History ==
It was planned to use the same boundaries as the Westminster Parliament constituencies for election of councillors to the Greater London Council (GLC), as had been the practice for elections to the predecessor London County Council, but those that existed in 1965 crossed the Greater London boundary. Until new constituencies could be settled, the 32 London boroughs were used as electoral areas. The London Borough of Tower Hamlets formed the Tower Hamlets electoral division. This was used for the Greater London Council elections in 1964, 1967 and 1970.

The new constituencies were settled following the Second Periodic Review of Westminster constituencies and the new electoral division matched the boundaries of the Stepney and Poplar parliamentary constituency.

It covered an area of 1,164 hectares (11.64 km^{2}).

== Elections ==
The Stepney and Poplar constituency was used for the Greater London Council elections in 1973, 1977 and 1981. One councillor was elected at each election using first-past-the-post voting.

John Patrick Branagan, who was successful at every election to the constituency, was previously elected to represent Tower Hamlets in 1964, 1967 and 1970. He represented Poplar on the London County Council from 1949 to 1965.

=== 1973 election ===
The fourth election to the GLC (and first using revised boundaries) was held on 12 April 1973. The electorate was 60,334 and one Labour Party councillor was elected. The turnout was 24.1%. The councillor was elected for a three-year term. This was extended for an extra year in 1976 when the electoral cycle was switched to four-yearly.

1973 Greater London Council election: Stepney and Poplar
Party	Candidate	Votes	%	±%
Labour	John Patrick Branagan	13,062	89.80	
Conservative	P. E. Bridge	782	5.38	
Communist	Max Samuel Levitas	703	4.83	
Turnout				
Labour win (new seat)				

=== 1977 election ===
The fifth election to the GLC (and second using revised boundaries) was held on 5 May 1977. The electorate was 59,799 and one Labour Party councillor was elected. The turnout was 28.7%. The councillor was elected for a four-year term.

1977 Greater London Council election: Stepney and Poplar
Party	Candidate	Votes	%	±%
Labour	John Patrick Branagan	10,129	59.03	
Conservative	S. P. Williams	2,914	16.98	
National Front	F. C. Berry	2,819	16.42	
Liberal	M. Caplan	591	3.44	
Communist	Max Samuel Levitas	553	3.22	
GLC Abolitionist Campaign	M. I. Macdonald	163	0.95	
Turnout				
Labour hold		Swing		

=== 1981 election ===
The sixth and final election to the GLC (and third using revised boundaries) was held on 7 May 1981. The electorate was 59,997 and one Labour Party councillor was elected. The turnout was 31.8%. The councillor was elected for a four-year term, extended by an extra year by the Local Government (Interim Provisions) Act 1984, ahead of the abolition of the council.

1981 Greater London Council election: Stepney and Poplar
Party	Candidate	Votes	%	±%
Labour	John Patrick Branagan	14,538	76.26	
Conservative	Elizabeth N. Spencer	2,458	12.90	
National Front	Peter W. Pomery-Rudd	618	3.24	
Communist	Max Samuel Levitas	487	2.56	
Enoch Powell is Right	Jean R. White	487	2.56	
Ecology	David J. Fitzpatrick	475	2.49	
Turnout				
Labour hold		Swing		
