= Robin Inskip, 2nd Viscount Caldecote =

British peer and engineer

The Right Honourable The Viscount Caldecote KBE DSC FREng
- Image by Godfrey Argent. Published 19 September 1969.

Member of the House of Lords Lord Temporal
- In office 11 October 1947 – 20 September 1999; Hereditary Peerage
- Preceded by: The 1st Viscount Caldecote
- Succeeded by: The 3rd Viscount Caldecote

Personal details
- Born: 8 October 1917
- Died: 20 September 1999 (aged 81)
- Education: Eton College

Robert Andrew "Robin" Inskip, 2nd Viscount Caldecote KBE DSC FREng (8 October 1917 – 20 September 1999) was a British peer and engineer.

The son of Thomas Inskip, 1st Viscount Caldecote, Inskip succeeded to the Viscountcy on the death of his father in 1947. Educated at Eton and King's College, Cambridge, he served in the RNVR during World War II gaining the DSC. When peace returned he was a Lecturer in Electrical Engineering at Cambridge University and after that Managing Director of English Electric Aviation. He was instrumental in setting up the British Aircraft Corporation and also Chairman of the Delta Metal Company and Investors in Industry. Additionally he was President of the Fellowship of Engineering, Chairman of the Crown Appointments Committee and Pro-Chancellor of the Cranfield Institute of Technology. His wife died in 2009.

== Arms ==
Coat of arms of Robin Inskip, 2nd Viscount Caldecote
Crest Upon the battlements of a tower a grouse’s leg erased Proper. Escutcheon Per chevron Azure and Argent in chief two crosses pate Or and in base an eagled displayed of the first. Supporters On the dexter side a talbot and on the sinister side a pegasus Proper each charged on the shoulder with a garb Or. Motto Be Careful

Peerage of the United Kingdom
Preceded by Thomas Walker Hobart Inskip	Viscount Caldecote; 1947–1999	Succeeded by Piers James Hampden Inskip
