= Bexley (constituency) =

Parliamentary constituency in the United Kingdom, 1945–1974

- Former borough constituency for the House of Commons
- Boundary of Bexley in Kent for the 1955 general election
- County: Kent (pre-1965); Greater London (post-1965)

1945–1974
- Seats: One
- Created from: Dartford
- Replaced by: Bexleyheath, Sidcup

Bexley was a parliamentary constituency centred on the Bexley district of what is now southeast London, which existed from 1945 to 1974. It returned one Member of Parliament (MP) to the House of Commons of the UK Parliament.

Its most famous MP was Edward Heath, who held the seat from 1950 until 1974, when he was re-elected in the newly-established seat of Sidcup. Heath served as Prime Minister from June 1970 to March 1974, resigning shortly after the February 1974 general election.

== Boundaries and boundary changes ==
| Dates | Local authority | Maps | Wards |
|---|---|---|---|
| 1945–1974 | Municipal Borough of Bexley (before 1965); London Borough of Bexley (after 1965) | | The Municipal Borough of Bexley |

=== 1945–1974 ===
The constituency was formed entirely from the existing constituency of Dartford.

== History ==
The constituency was created for the 1945 general election, from the Dartford seat, and abolished for the February 1974 general election and replaced by the two new constituencies of Bexleyheath and Sidcup.

The constituency's boundaries were co-terminous with those of the Municipal Borough of Bexley.

The MP when the constituency was abolished, the then Conservative Prime Minister Edward Heath, fought and won the new Sidcup constituency in 1974. He went on to represent the new seat of Old Bexley and Sidcup from 1983 until he retired from Parliament in 2001 after having been an MP for 51 years.

== Members of Parliament ==
| Election | Member | Party | Notes |
|---|---|---|---|
| 1945 | Jennie Adamson | Labour | MP for Dartford (1937–1945); resigned 1946 |
| 1946 by-election | Ashley Bramall | Labour | |
| 1950 | Edward Heath | Conservative | Leader of the Conservative Party 1965–1975; Prime Minister 1970–1974; Contested Sidcup following redistribution |
| Feb 1974 | constituency abolished: see Bexleyheath & Sidcup | | |

== Election results ==
=== Elections in the 1940s ===
General election 1945: Bexley
| Party | Candidate | Votes | % |
|---|---|---|---|
| Labour | Jennie Adamson | 24,686 | 56.9 |
| Conservative | John Lockwood | 12,923 | 29.8 |
| Liberal | Ward Smith | 5,750 | 13.3 |
| Majority | | 11,763 | 27.1 |
| Turnout | | 43,359 | 76.7 |
| Registered electors | | 56,557 | |
| Labour win (new seat) | | | |

1946 Bexley by-election
| Party | Candidate | Votes | % | ±% |
|---|---|---|---|---|
| Labour | Ashley Bramall | 19,759 | 52.5 | –4.5 |
| Conservative | John Lockwood | 17,908 | 47.5 | +17.7 |
| Majority | | 1,851 | 4.9 | –22.2 |
| Turnout | | 37,667 | 62.6 | –14.0 |
| Registered electors | | 60,152 | | |
| Labour hold | | Swing | –11.1 | |

=== Elections in the 1950s ===
General election 1950: Bexley
| Party | Candidate | Votes | % | ±% |
|---|---|---|---|---|
| Conservative | Edward Heath | 25,854 | 46.0 | +16.2 |
| Labour | Ashley Bramall | 25,721 | 45.7 | –11.2 |
| Liberal | Mary Hart | 4,186 | 7.4 | –5.8 |
| Communist | Charlie Job | 481 | 0.9 | New |
| Majority | | 133 | 0.2 | N/A |
| Turnout | | 56,242 | 88.7 | +12.0 |
| Registered electors | | 63,429 | | |
| Conservative gain from Labour | | Swing | +13.7 | |

General election 1951: Bexley
| Party | Candidate | Votes | % | ±% |
|---|---|---|---|---|
| Conservative | Edward Heath | 29,069 | 51.5 | +5.5 |
| Labour | Ashley Bramall | 27,430 | 48.5 | +2.8 |
| Majority | | 1,639 | 2.9 | +2.7 |
| Turnout | | 56,499 | 87.8 | –0.9 |
| Registered electors | | 64,343 | | |
| Conservative hold | | Swing | +1.3 | |

General election 1955: Bexley
| Party | Candidate | Votes | % | ±% |
|---|---|---|---|---|
| Conservative | Edward Heath | 28,610 | 54.3 | +2.8 |
| Labour | Rubeigh Minney | 24,111 | 45.7 | –2.8 |
| Majority | | 4,499 | 8.5 | +5.6 |
| Turnout | | 52,721 | 82.6 | –5.3 |
| Registered electors | | 63,863 | | |
| Conservative hold | | Swing | +2.8 | |

General election 1959: Bexley
| Party | Candidate | Votes | % | ±% |
|---|---|---|---|---|
| Conservative | Edward Heath | 32,025 | 57.8 | +3.5 |
| Labour | Ashley Bramall | 23,392 | 42.2 | –3.5 |
| Majority | | 8,633 | 15.6 | +7.0 |
| Turnout | | 55,517 | 85.4 | +2.8 |
| Registered electors | | 64,906 | | |
| Conservative hold | | Swing | +3.5 | |

=== Elections in the 1960s ===
General election 1964: Bexley
| Party | Candidate | Votes | % | ±% |
|---|---|---|---|---|
| Conservative | Edward Heath | 25,716 | 47.4 | –10.4 |
| Labour | Leslie Reeves | 21,127 | 38.9 | –3.3 |
| Liberal | Peter MacArthur | 6,161 | 11.4 | New |
| Anti-Common Market League | John Paul | 1,263 | 2.3 | New |
| Majority | | 4,589 | 8.5 | –7.1 |
| Turnout | | 54,227 | 84.5 | –0.9 |
| Registered electors | | 64,240 | | |
| Conservative hold | | Swing | –3.6 | |

General election 1966: Bexley
| Party | Candidate | Votes | % | ±% |
|---|---|---|---|---|
| Conservative | Edward Heath | 26,377 | 48.1 | +0.7 |
| Labour | Russell Butler | 24,044 | 43.9 | +4.9 |
| Liberal | Richard Lloyd | 4,405 | 8.0 | −3.3 |
| Majority | | 2,333 | 4.3 | –4.2 |
| Turnout | | 54,826 | 85.8 | +1.3 |
| Registered electors | | 63,886 | | |
| Conservative hold | | Swing | -2.1 | |

=== Election in the 1970s ===
General election 1970: Bexley
| Party | Candidate | Votes | % | ±% |
|---|---|---|---|---|
| Conservative | Edward Heath | 27,075 | 53.0 | +4.9 |
| Labour | John Cartwright | 19,017 | 37.2 | −6.6 |
| Liberal | Edward Harrison | 3,222 | 6.3 | −1.7 |
| Independent | Edward J R L Heath | 938 | 1.8 | New |
| Ind. Conservative | Michael Coney | 833 | 1.6 | New |
| Majority | | 8,058 | 15.8 | +11.5 |
| Turnout | | 51,085 | 76.3 | −9.5 |
| Registered electors | | 66,980 | | |
| Conservative hold | | Swing | +5.8 | |

Parliament of the United Kingdom
| Preceded by Kinross and West Perthshire | Constituency represented by the leader of the opposition 1965–1970 | Succeeded by Huyton |
| Preceded by Huyton | Constituency represented by the prime minister 1970–1974 | Succeeded by Sidcup |
