= Jennie Adamson =

British politician

Janet Laurel Adamson
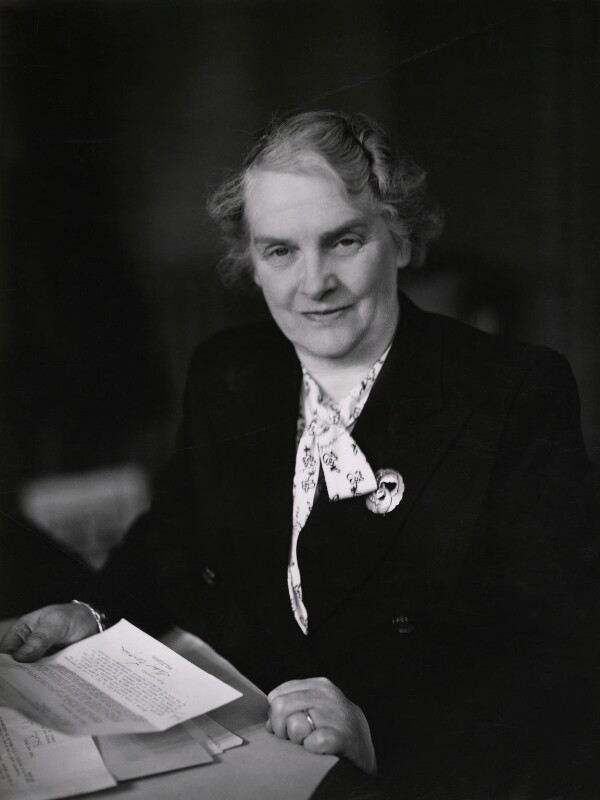
- Adamson in 1945

Member of Parliament
- In office 7 November 1938 – 21 July 1946
- Preceded by: Frank Clarke
- Succeeded by: Ashley Bramall
- Constituency: Dartford (1938–1945); Bexley (1945–1946)

Chair of the National Executive Committee of the Labour Party
- In office 1935–1936
- Preceded by: William Albert Robinson
- Succeeded by: Hugh Dalton

Member of London County Council for Lambeth North
- In office 8 March 1928 – 5 March 1931
- Preceded by: Richard Charles Powell
- Succeeded by: Ida Samuel

Personal details
- Born: Janet Laurel Johnston; 9 May 1882 Kilmarnock, Scotland
- Died: 25 April 1962 (aged 79)
- Party: Labour
- Spouse: William Murdoch Adamson (died 1945)

Janet Laurel Adamson (née Johnston; 9 May 1882 – 25 April 1962) was a British Labour Party politician who served as a Member of Parliament (MP) from 1938 to 1946, and as a junior minister in Clement Attlee's post-war Labour government.

== Early life ==
Janet Laurel Johnston was born on 9 May 1882, the daughter of Thomas Johnston of Kirkcudbright, a railway porter, and his wife Elizabeth Denton, in a family of six children. Her father died young, and her mother became a dressmaker. She had a secondary education, worked at dressmaking, and was employed as a teacher, and on factory work.

After her marriage in 1902, the family had an itinerant period in the North of England and Midlands; her husband sought work, hampered by his activism. Jennie Adamson was a suffragist, in Manchester, and joined the Labour Party in 1908. In Lincoln, she joined the Board of Guardians and campaigned for child welfare. In 1923, with William Adamson's election to parliament, the family moved to London.

== Political career ==
Adamson belonged to the Workers' Union in 1912, and was an organiser in the 1913 Black Country strike. At the time of the 1926 General Strike she was on the Women's National Strike Committee.

From 1928 to 1931, Adamson was a member of London County Council for Lambeth North. She served on the National Executive Committee of the Labour Party from 1927 to 1947, which she chaired from 1935 to 1936. In 1936, she chaired the Labour Party Conference.

Adamson unsuccessfully contested Dartford at the 1935 general election, when the sitting Conservative MP Frank Clarke held the seat with a significantly reduced majority. Clarke died in July 1938, however, and at the resulting by-election in November 1938, Adamson won the seat on a swing of 4.2%. Jennie and William Adamson became the only husband and wife team in the House of Commons.

The constituency was divided in boundary changes for the 1945 general election, when Adamson was elected with a large majority (27% of the votes) for the new Bexley constituency. She served as a Parliamentary Private Secretary from 1940 to 1945 to Walter Womersley, at the Ministry of Pensions; and as Parliamentary Secretary from 1945 to 1946 there, under Wilfred Paling as minister.

Adamson resigned from Parliament in 1946, becoming Deputy Chair of the Unemployment Assistance Board from 1946 to 1953. Her resignation precipitated a by-election in July 1946 which was narrowly won by the Labour candidate Ashley Bramall. At the next general election, in 1950, the seat was won by future Prime Minister Edward Heath.

== Death ==
Jennie Adamson died on 25 April 1962.

== Family ==
Jennie Johnston married in 1902 William Murdoch Adamson, a Transport and General Workers' Union official who became Labour MP for Cannock. They had two sons and two daughters. Their younger son, Thomas Johnston Adamson, was killed in action with the RAF in March 1944.

Parliament of the United Kingdom
Preceded by Frank Clarke	Member of Parliament for Dartford; 1938 – 1945	Succeeded by Norman Dodds
New constituency	Member of Parliament for Bexley; 1945 – 1946	Succeeded by Ashley Bramall
Political offices
Preceded by William Sidney	Parliamentary Secretary to the Minister for Pensions; 1945 – 1946	Succeeded by Arthur Blenkinsop
Party political offices
Preceded by William Albert Robinson	Chair of the Labour Party; 1935–1936	Succeeded by Hugh Dalton
