= Lettice Fisher =

Social worker

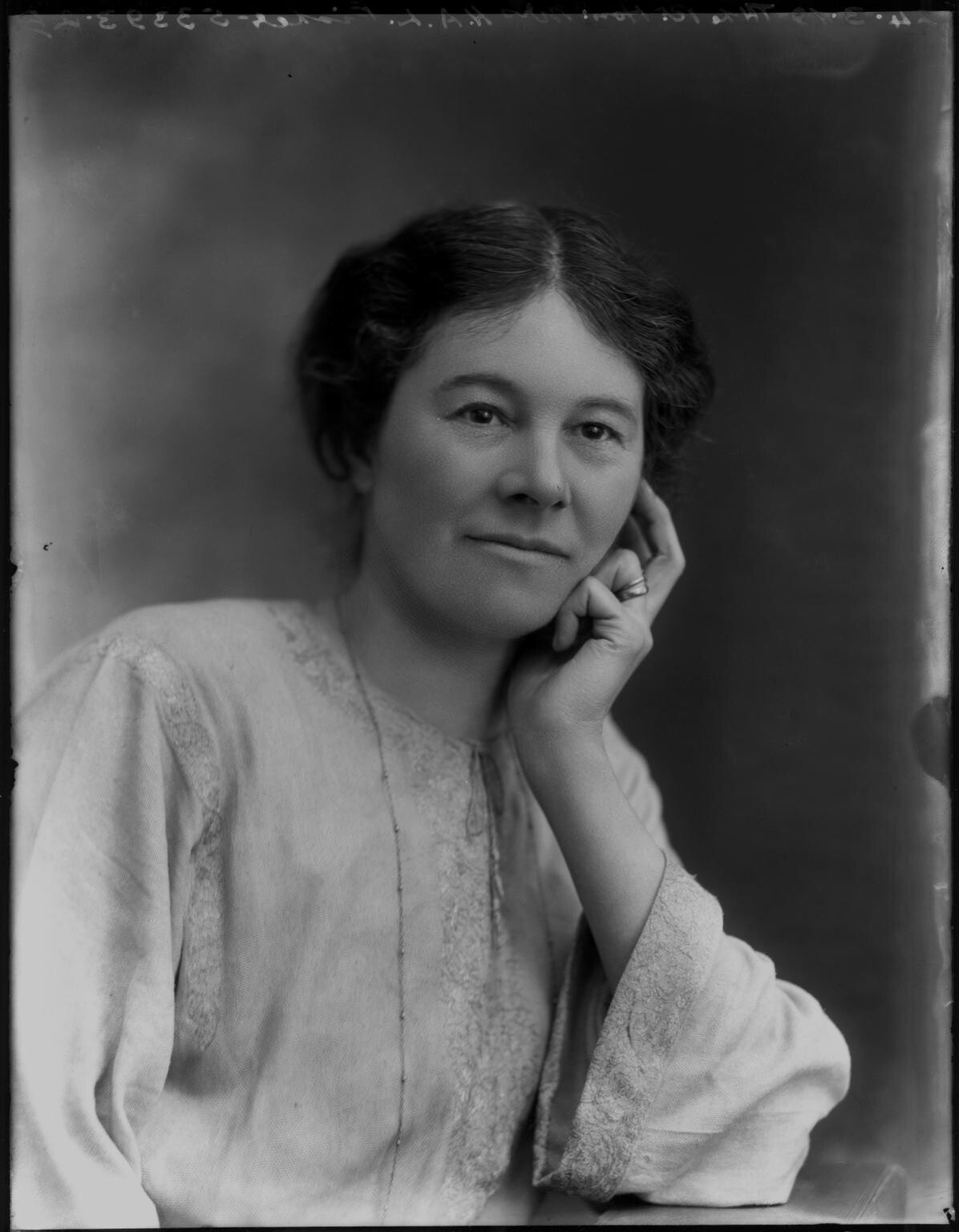
- Born: Lettice Ilbert; 14 June 1875; London, United Kingdom of Great Britain and Ireland
- Died: 14 February 1956 (aged 80); Thursley, United Kingdom
- Education: Somerville College, Oxford
- Occupations: Educator, economist, and suffragette
- Known for: Founder of the National Council for the Unmarried Mother and her Child
- Spouse: H. A. L. Fisher (m. 1899; died 1940)

Lettice Fisher (née Ilbert; 14 June 1875 – 14 February 1956) was the founder of the National Council for the Unmarried Mother and her Child, now known as Gingerbread. She was also an economist and a historian.

== Background and education ==
Lettice Ilbert was born on 14 June 1875 in Kensington, London to Sir Courtenay Peregrine Ilbert and his wife, Jessie.

She was educated at Francis Holland School, London and Somerville College, Oxford, where she was awarded a first in modern history in 1897. She worked as a researcher at the London School of Economics from 1897 to 1898. From 1902 to 1913, she taught history at St Hugh's College, Oxford, and she also taught economics for the Association for the Higher Education of Women in Oxford.

Whilst at Oxford, Fisher was also involved in voluntary work in housing, public health and child welfare. She was an active suffragist, chairing the national executive of the National Union of Women's Suffrage Societies (NUWSS) from 1916 to 1918. She ran to become President of the NUWSS in 1919, following Millicent Fawcett's post-war resignation, but was defeated by Eleanor Rathbone.

== The National Council for the Unmarried Mother and her Child ==
During World War I, Fisher undertook welfare work among women munitions workers in Sheffield. It was the wartime scale of illegitimacy and its resulting hardships that led her, in 1918, to found the National Council for the Unmarried Mother and her Child, in order to challenge the stigma associated with single parent families, and to provide them with the support they needed.

The Council aimed to reform the Bastardy Acts and Affiliation Orders Acts, which discriminated against illegitimate children, and also to address the higher death rates of children born outside marriage, by providing accommodation for single mothers and their babies. They also provided practical advice and assistance to single parents, and helped with their inquiries.

Lettice Fisher was the first chair of the Council (from 1918 to 1950), with Sybil Neville-Rolfe acting as the deputy chair.

== Family life ==
In July 1899, she married Herbert Albert Laurens Fisher, a tutor at New College, Oxford, who had taught her as an undergraduate. He sat as Liberal Member of Parliament in Sheffield Hallam in 1916-18 and became Warden of New College in 1925.

In 1913, they had one daughter, Mary Bennett, who became principal of St Hilda's College, Oxford, from 1965 to 1980. She was interviewed, in October 1974, about her parents, by the historian, Brian Harrison, as part of the Suffrage Interviews project, titled Oral evidence on the suffragette and suffragist movements: the Brian Harrison interviews. Bennett talks about her mother's character and friendships in Oxford, her advice to new mothers and her teaching, writing and broadcasting. She also discusses Fisher's support for his wife, and their shared interests in Oxford, Suffragism and Liberal politics, as well as their friendship with Gilbert Murray and Sir Lady Murray.

An undergraduate of New College, Michael Crum, was also interviewed about Fisher in November 1974. He recalled her termly teas for undergraduates, work for unmarried mothers and membership of the university orchestra, playing the violin.

After her husband's death in 1940, she moved to Thursley in Surrey. She died there on 14 February 1956 after suffering a stroke. After cremation her ashes were interred at New College, Oxford.
