= Tower Hamlets (electoral division) =

Electoral division in Greater London, 1965–1973

- Former electoral division for the Greater London Council
- Tower Hamlets electoral division boundaries
- District: London Borough of Tower Hamlets
- Population: 188,080 (1969 estimate)
- Electorate: 136,374 (1964); 130,349 (1967); 126,738 (1970)
- Area: 4,875.8 acres (19.732 km^{2})

Former electoral division
- Created: 1965
- Abolished: 1973
- Member(s): 2
- Replaced by: Bethnal Green and Bow and Stepney and Poplar

Tower Hamlets was an electoral division for the purposes of elections to the Greater London Council. The constituency elected two councillors for a three-year term in 1964, 1967, and 1970.

== History ==
It was planned to use the same boundaries as the Westminster Parliament constituencies for election of councillors to the Greater London Council (GLC), as had been the practice for elections to the predecessor London County Council, but those that existed in 1965 crossed the Greater London boundary. Until new constituencies could be settled, the 32 London boroughs were used as electoral areas which therefore created a constituency called Tower Hamlets.

The electoral division was replaced from 1973 by the single-member electoral divisions of Bethnal Green and Bow and Stepney and Poplar.

== Elections ==
The Tower Hamlets constituency was used for the Greater London Council elections in 1964, 1967 and 1970. Two councillors were elected at each election using first-past-the-post voting.

=== 1964 election ===
The first election was held on 9 April 1964, a year before the council came into its powers. The electorate was 136,374 and two Labour Party councillors were elected. With 32,473 people voting, the turnout was 23.8%. The councillors were elected for a three-year term.

1964 Greater London Council election: Tower Hamlets
Party	Candidate	Votes	%	±%
Labour	John Patrick Branagan	25,350		
Labour	Ernest Ashley Bramall	24,488		
Communist	Solly Kaye	2,618		
Liberal	S. H. Woodham	2,179		
Liberal	J. W. Parton	2,133		
Conservative	A. J. Lawrence	2,113		
Conservative	B. Hawley	1,959		
Turnout				
Labour win (new seat)				
Labour win (new seat)				

=== 1967 election ===
The second election was held on 13 April 1967. The electorate was 130,349 and two Labour Party councillors were elected. With 25,841 people voting, the turnout was 19.8%. The councillors were elected for a three-year term.

1967 Greater London Council election: Tower Hamlets
Party	Candidate	Votes	%	±%
Labour	John Patrick Branagan	16,477		
Labour	Ernest Ashley Bramall	15,663		
Conservative	R. D. Mitchell	3,996		
Conservative	C. D. Sills	3,509		
Liberal	E. G. Weekes	2,793		
Liberal	S. H. Woodham	2,786		
Communist	Solly Kaye	2,707		
Turnout				
Labour hold		Swing		
Labour hold		Swing		

=== 1970 election ===
The third election was held on 9 April 1970. The electorate was 126,738 and two Labour Party councillors were elected. With 29,296 people voting, the turnout was 23.1%. The councillors were elected for a three-year term.

1970 Greater London Council election: Tower Hamlets
Party	Candidate	Votes	%	±%
Labour	John Patrick Branagan	22,866		
Labour	Ernest Ashley Bramall	21,794		
Conservative	R. D. Mitchell	3,052		
Conservative	P. R. C. Lloyd	2,934		
Independent	W. O'Dell	1,551		
Communist	Max Levitas	1,223		
Liberal	G. F. Stewart	1,065		
Liberal	C. A. S. Suett	954		
Homes before Roads	J. L. P. Drake	390		
Homes before Roads	R. K. Hall	241		
Union Movement	F. C. Lang	192		
Turnout				
Labour hold		Swing		
Labour hold		Swing		
