= Fareham (constituency) =

UK Parliament constituency (1974–2024)

- Former county constituency for the House of Commons
- Boundary of Fareham in Hampshire

- Location of Hampshire within England
- County: Hampshire
- Electorate: 76,457 (December 2010)
- Major settlements: Fareham, Portchester, Warsash

1974–2024
- Seats: One
- Created from: Gosport and Fareham
- Replaced by: Fareham and Waterlooville and Hamble Valley

1885–1950
- Seats: One
- Type of constituency: County constituency
- Created from: South Hampshire
- Replaced by: Gosport and Fareham and Portsmouth Langstone

Fareham was a constituency (Note: A county constituency (for the purposes of election expenses and type of returning officer).) in Hampshire represented in the House of Commons of the UK Parliament. (Note: As with all current constituencies, the constituency elected one Member of Parliament (MP) by the first past the post system of election at least every five years.) It existed from 1885 to 1950 and again from 1974 to 2024. Its final Member of Parliament (MP) was Suella Braverman of the Conservative Party, first elected in 2015 (under her maiden name of Suella Fernandes), who served as Home Secretary in 2022–2023.

Following the 2023 Periodic Review of Westminster constituencies, the constituency was abolished at the 2024 general election: the majority, comprising Fareham and Portchester, was incorporated into the new constituency of Fareham and Waterlooville (which Braverman contested and won), with the remainder, comprising the villages of Locks Heath, Park Gate, Sarisbury, Titchfield and Warsash, forming part of the newly created constituency of Hamble Valley.

== Constituency profile ==
The largest town is Fareham, and other communities include Portchester, Locks Heath, Warsash and Titchfield. There are many commuters to Southampton and Portsmouth. The Royal Navy and Merchant Navy have training facilities. Residents are wealthier than the UK average.

== Boundaries ==
Map of boundaries 1997–2024

1885–1918: The Municipal Boroughs of Portsmouth and Southampton, the Sessional Division of Fareham, and part of the Sessional Division of Southampton.

1918–1950: The Urban Districts of Fareham, Gosport and Alverstoke, Havant, and Warblington, and the Rural Districts of Fareham and Havant.

1974–1983: The Urban District of Fareham.

1983–1997: The Borough of Fareham except the wards of Hill Head and Stubbington, and the City of Winchester wards of Boarhunt and Southwick, Curdridge, Denmead, Droxford Soberton and Hambledon, Shedfield, Swanmore, Waltham Chase, and Wickham.

1997–2024: The Borough of Fareham wards of Fareham North, Fareham North-West, Fareham South, Fareham West, Locks Heath, Park Gate, Portchester East, Portchester West, Sarisbury, Titchfield, Titchfield Common, and Warsash.

== History ==
The constituency was first created in 1885. In January 1905 the Liberal Party employed Bertha Bowness Foulkes who was Britain's second constituency woman political agent. The constituency was abolished in 1950 and succeeded by Gosport and Fareham but revived in 1974. The constituency has always been represented by Conservatives.

== Members of Parliament ==
=== MPs 1885–1950 ===
Election	Member	Party
1885	Sir Frederick Fitzwygram	Conservative
1900	Arthur Lee	Conservative
1918	John Davidson	Conservative
1931 by-election	Thomas Inskip	Conservative
1939 by-election	Dymoke White	Conservative
1950	Constituency abolished: see Gosport and Fareham	

=== MPs 1974–2024 ===
Election	Member	Party
Feb. 1974	Reginald Bennett	Conservative
1979	Sir Peter Lloyd	Conservative
2001	Mark Hoban	Conservative
2015	Suella Braverman	Conservative
2024	Constituency abolished: see Fareham and Waterlooville	

== Election results 1922–2019 ==
=== Elections in the 2010s ===
General election 2019: Fareham
Party	Candidate	Votes	%	±%
Conservative	Suella Braverman	36,459	63.7	+0.7
Labour	Matthew Randall	10,373	18.1	−7.1
Liberal Democrats	Matthew Winnington	8,006	14.0	+7.2
Green	Nick Lyle	2,412	4.2	+1.9
Majority		26,086	45.6	+7.8
Turnout		57,250	73.1	+0.8
Conservative hold		Swing	+3.9	

General election 2017: Fareham
Party	Candidate	Votes	%	±%
Conservative	Suella Fernandes	35,915	63.0	+6.9
Labour	Matthew Randall	14,360	25.2	+10.9
Liberal Democrats	Matthew Winnington	3,896	6.8	−2.0
UKIP	Tony Blewett	1,541	2.7	−12.7
Green	Miles Grindey	1,302	2.3	−1.6
Majority		21,555	37.8	−2.9
Turnout		57,014	72.3	+1.5
Conservative hold		Swing	-2.0	

General election 2015: Fareham
Party	Candidate	Votes	%	±%
Conservative	Suella Fernandes	30,689	56.1	+0.8
UKIP	Malcolm Jones	8,427	15.4	+11.3
Labour	Stuart Rose	7,800	14.3	+0.1
Liberal Democrats	Matthew Winnington	4,814	8.8	−15.0
Green	Miles Grindey	2,129	3.9	+2.4
Independent	Nick Gregory	705	1.3	New
Independent	Harvey Hines	136	0.2	New
Majority		22,262	40.7	+9.2
Turnout		54,700	70.8	−0.8
Conservative hold		Swing	-5.3	

General election 2010: Fareham
Party	Candidate	Votes	%	±%
Conservative	Mark Hoban	30,037	55.3	+5.6
Liberal Democrats	Alex Bentley	12,945	23.8	+2.1
Labour	James Carr	7,719	14.2	−11.4
UKIP	Steve Richards	2,235	4.1	+1.2
Green	Peter Doggett	791	1.5	New
English Democrat	Joe Jenkins	618	1.1	New
Majority		17,092	31.5	+7.4
Turnout		54,345	71.6	+4.7
Conservative hold		Swing	+1.7	

=== Elections in the 2000s ===
General election 2005: Fareham
Party	Candidate	Votes	%	±%
Conservative	Mark Hoban	24,151	49.7	+2.6
Labour	James Carr	12,449	25.6	−6.0
Liberal Democrats	Richard de Ste-Croix	10,551	21.7	+3.0
UKIP	Peter Mason-Apps	1,425	2.9	+0.3
Majority		11,702	24.1	+8.6
Turnout		48,576	66.9	+3.4
Conservative hold		Swing	+4.3	

General election 2001: Fareham
Party	Candidate	Votes	%	±%
Conservative	Mark Hoban	21,389	47.1	+0.3
Labour	James Carr	14,380	31.6	+4.6
Liberal Democrats	Hugh Pritchard	8,503	18.7	−0.9
UKIP	William O’Brien	1,175	2.6	New
Majority		7,009	15.5	−4.3
Turnout		45,447	63.5	−3.4
Conservative hold		Swing		

=== Elections in the 1990s ===
General election 1997: Fareham
Party	Candidate	Votes	%	±%
Conservative	Peter Lloyd	24,436	46.8	−14.2
Labour	Michael A. Prior	14,078	27.0	+13.8
Liberal Democrats	Grace Hill	10,234	19.6	−5.0
Referendum	Dayne Markham	2,914	5.6	New
No to Europe	William O'Brien	515	1.0	New
Majority		10,358	19.8	−16.6
Turnout		52,177	75.9	−6.0
Conservative hold		Swing		

General election 1992: Fareham
Party	Candidate	Votes	%	±%
Conservative	Peter Lloyd	40,482	61.0	−0.1
Liberal Democrats	John C. Thompson	16,341	24.6	−5.3
Labour	Elizabeth M. Weston	8,766	13.2	+4.2
Green	Malcolm J. Brimecome	818	1.2	New
Majority		24,141	36.4	+5.2
Turnout		66,407	81.9	+3.5
Conservative hold		Swing	+2.6	

=== Elections in the 1980s ===
General election 1987: Fareham
Party	Candidate	Votes	%	±%
Conservative	Peter Lloyd	36,781	61.1	−0.7
Liberal	Timothy Slack	17,986	29.9	−1.1
Labour	Michael Merritt	5,451	9.0	+1.8
Majority		18,795	31.2	+0.4
Turnout		60,218	78.4	+4.7
Conservative hold		Swing		

General election 1983: Fareham
Party	Candidate	Votes	%	±%
Conservative	Peter Lloyd	32,762	61.8	
Liberal	Steve Yolland	16,446	31.0	
Labour	Dennis Sommerville	3,808	7.2	
Majority		16,316	30.8	
Turnout		53,016	73.7	
Conservative hold		Swing		

=== Elections in the 1970s ===
General election 1979: Fareham
Party	Candidate	Votes	%	±%
Conservative	Peter Lloyd	28,730	59.0	+15.8
Liberal	W.P. Boulden	11,685	24.0	−9.1
Labour	B.R. Townsend	8,041	16.5	−2.0
National Front	D.C. Vine	252	0.5	−0.9
Majority		17,045	35.0	+25.1
Turnout		48,708	79.1	+2.1
Conservative hold		Swing		

General election October 1974: Fareham
Party	Candidate	Votes	%	±%
Conservative	Reginald Bennett	19,053	43.2	−4.4
Liberal	P. Smith	14,605	33.1	+2.3
Labour	B.R. Townsend	8,153	18.5	+0.9
Ind. Conservative	W.P. Boulden	1,727	3.9	−0.1
National Front	R.M. Doughty	617	1.4	New
Majority		4,448	10.1	−6.7
Turnout		44,155	77.0	−5.4
Conservative hold		Swing		

General election February 1974: Fareham
Party	Candidate	Votes	%	±%
Conservative	Reginald Bennett	22,303	47.6	
Liberal	P. Smith	14,426	30.8	
Labour	J. Horne	8,237	17.6	
Ind. Conservative	W.P. Boulden	1,879	4.0	
Majority		7,877	16.8	
Turnout		46,845	82.4	
Conservative win (new seat)				

=== Elections in the 1940s ===
General election 1945: Fareham
Party	Candidate	Votes	%	±%
Conservative	Dymoke White	35,882	52.47	
Labour	Ashley Bramall	32,501	47.53	
Majority		3,381	4.94	
Turnout		68,383	70.96	
Conservative hold		Swing		

=== Elections in the 1930s ===
1939 Fareham by-election
Party	Candidate	Votes	%	±%
Conservative	Dymoke White	Unopposed		
Conservative hold				

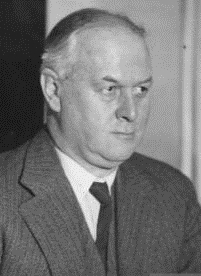
Inskip

General election 1935: Fareham
Party	Candidate	Votes	%	±%
Conservative	Thomas Inskip	31,794	75.07	
Labour	Robert Mack	10,561	24.93	New
Majority		21,233	50.14	
Turnout		42,355	61.92	
Conservative hold		Swing		

General election 1931: Fareham
Party	Candidate	Votes	%	±%
Conservative	Thomas Inskip	Unopposed		
Conservative hold				

1931 Fareham by-election
Party	Candidate	Votes	%	±%
Conservative	Thomas Inskip	18,749	65.6	+11.4
Labour	Arthur James Pearson	6,312	22.1	±0.0
Liberal	Conyngham Peters Cross	3,517	12.3	−11.4
Majority		12,437	43.5	+13.0
Turnout		28,578	50.3	−17.7
Conservative hold		Swing		

=== Elections in the 1920s ===
General election 1929: Fareham
Party	Candidate	Votes	%	±%
Unionist	John Davidson	19,756	54.2	−21.0
Liberal	Conyngham Peters Cross	8,630	23.7	New
Labour	Arthur James Pearson	8,034	22.1	−2.7
Majority		11,126	30.5	−19.9
Turnout		36,420	68.0	−0.8
Unionist hold		Swing	N/A	

General election 1924: Fareham
Party	Candidate	Votes	%	±%
Unionist	John Davidson	19,108	75.2	+5.8
Labour	Joseph Bowron Baker	6,304	24.8	−5.8
Majority		12,804	50.4	+11.6
Turnout		25,412	68.8	+9.1
Unionist hold		Swing	+5.8	

General election 1923: Fareham
Party	Candidate	Votes	%	±%
Unionist	John Davidson	14,787	69.4	−3.7
Labour	Joseph Bowron Baker	6,526	30.6	+3.7
Majority		8,261	38.8	−7.4
Turnout		21,313	59.7	−7.7
Unionist hold		Swing	-3.7	

General election 1922: Fareham
Party	Candidate	Votes	%	±%
Unionist	John Davidson	17,008	73.1	N/A
Labour	C H Hoare	6,245	26.9	New
Majority		10,763	46.2	N/A
Turnout		23,253	67.4	N/A
Unionist hold		Swing	N/A	

== Election results 1885–1918 ==
=== Elections in the 1880s ===
Frederick Fitzwygram

General election 1885: Fareham
Party	Candidate	Votes	%	±%
Conservative	Frederick Fitzwygram	5,177	53.4	
Liberal	Reginald Garton Wilberforce	4,518	46.6	
Majority		659	6.8	
Turnout		9,695	79.7	
Registered electors		12,162		
Conservative win (new seat)				

General election 1886: Fareham
Party	Candidate	Votes	%	±%
Conservative	Frederick Fitzwygram	Unopposed		
Conservative hold				

=== Elections in the 1890s ===
General election 1892: Fareham
Party	Candidate	Votes	%	±%
Conservative	Frederick Fitzwygram	6,086	57.2	N/A
Liberal	James Grab Niven	4,547	42.8	New
Majority		1,539	14.4	N/A
Turnout		10,633	77.0	N/A
Registered electors		13,816		
Conservative hold		Swing	N/A	

General election 1895: Fareham
Party	Candidate	Votes	%	±%
Conservative	Frederick Fitzwygram	Unopposed		
Conservative hold				

=== Elections in the 1900s ===
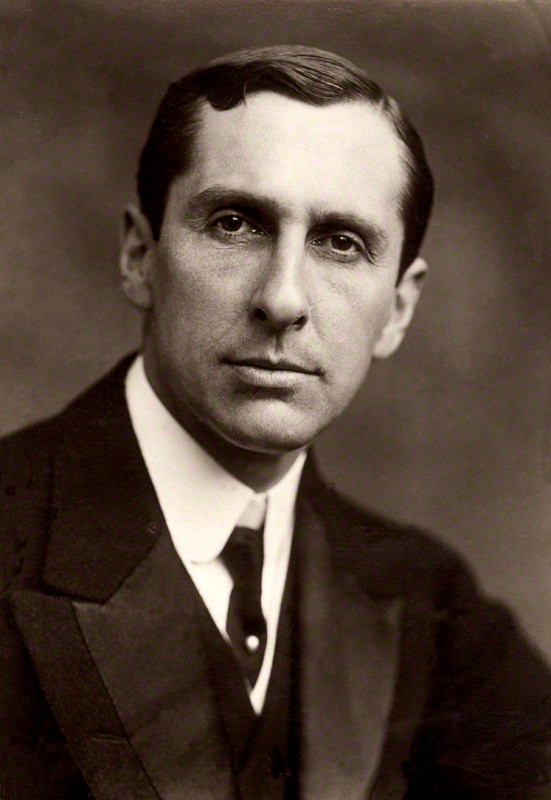
Lee

General election 1900: Fareham
Party	Candidate	Votes	%	±%
Conservative	Arthur Lee	7,375	65.8	N/A
Liberal	Robert Tweedy-Smith	3,828	34.2	New
Majority		3,547	31.6	N/A
Turnout		11,203	69.8	N/A
Registered electors		16,050		
Conservative hold		Swing	N/A	

1903 Fareham by-election
Party	Candidate	Votes	%	±%
Conservative	Arthur Lee	Unopposed		
Conservative hold				

General election 1906: Fareham
Party	Candidate	Votes	%	±%
Conservative	Arthur Lee	7,683	54.8	−11.0
Liberal	George Evatt	6,331	45.2	+11.0
Majority		1,352	9.6	−22.0
Turnout		14,014	80.5	+10.7
Registered electors		17,398		
Conservative hold		Swing	−11.0	

=== Elections in the 1910s ===
General election January 1910: Fareham
Party	Candidate	Votes	%	±%
Conservative	Arthur Lee	10,117	63.7	+8.9
Liberal	John Sandy	5,763	36.3	−8.9
Majority		4,354	27.4	+17.8
Turnout		15,880	84.9	+4.4
Registered electors		18,695		
Conservative hold		Swing	+8.9	

General election December 1910: Fareham
Party	Candidate	Votes	%	±%
Conservative	Arthur Lee	Unopposed		
Conservative hold				

General election 1914–15:

Another general election was required to take place before the end of 1915. The political parties had been making preparations for an election to take place and by July 1914, the following candidates had been selected;

- Unionist: Arthur Lee
- Liberal:

1918 Fareham by-election
Party	Candidate	Votes	%	±%
Unionist	John Davidson	Unopposed		
Unionist hold				

General election 1918: Fareham
Party		Candidate	Votes	%	±%
C	Unionist	John Davidson	Unopposed		
	Unionist hold				
C indicates candidate endorsed by the coalition government.

== See also ==
- List of parliamentary constituencies in Hampshire

== Sources ==
- Iain Dale, ed. (2003). The Times House of Commons 1929, 1931, 1935. Politico's (reprint). ISBN 1-84275-033-X.
- The Times House of Commons 1945. 1945.
- The Times House of Commons 1950. 1950.
- The Times House of Commons 1955. 1955.
