= 1918 Fareham by-election =

UK Parliamentary by-election

The 1918 Fareham by-election was held on 18 July 1918. The by-election was held due to the elevation of the incumbent Conservative MP, Sir Arthur Lee. It was won by the Conservative candidate John Humphrey Davidson who was unopposed due to a War-time electoral pact.
