= Gosport and Fareham =

Former parliamentary constituency in the United Kingdom

Coordinates: 50.818°N 1.173°W

- Former borough constituency for the House of Commons
- County: Hampshire

1950–February 1974
- Seats: One
- Created from: Fareham
- Replaced by: Gosport and Fareham

Gosport and Fareham was a parliamentary constituency in Hampshire which returned one Member of Parliament (MP) to the House of Commons of the Parliament of the United Kingdom from 1950 until it was abolished for the February 1974 general election.

It was then replaced by two new constituencies, Gosport and Fareham. The incumbent MP, Reginald Bennett, was re-elected in the new Fareham constituency.

== Boundaries ==
The Borough of Gosport, and the Urban District of Fareham.

== Members of Parliament ==
Election	Member	Party
1950	Reginald Bennett	Conservative
Feb 1974	Constituency abolished: see Gosport and Fareham	

== Election results ==
=== Elections in the 1950s ===
General election 1950: Gosport and Fareham
Party	Candidate	Votes	%
Conservative	Reginald Bennett	29,163	56.88
Labour	Alfred Robert Nobes	18,579	36.24
Liberal	Edgar Wilfred Borrow	3,531	6.89
Majority		10,584	20.64
Turnout		51,273	83.18
Conservative win (new seat)			

General election 1951: Gosport and Fareham
Party	Candidate	Votes	%	±%
Conservative	Reginald Bennett	30,727	60.21	
Labour	Norman Francis Stogdon	20,303	39.79	
Majority		10,424	20.42	
Turnout		51,030	80.89	
Conservative hold		Swing		

General election 1955: Gosport and Fareham
Party	Candidate	Votes	%	±%
Conservative	Reginald Bennett	30,918	62.65	
Labour	S James Surrey	18,432	37.35	
Majority		12,486	25.30	
Turnout		49,350	74.24	
Conservative hold		Swing		

General election 1959: Gosport and Fareham
Party	Candidate	Votes	%	±%
Conservative	Reginald Bennett	35,808	64.56	
Labour	Alan S Pratley	19,654	35.44	
Majority		16,154	29.12	
Turnout		55,462	75.68	
Conservative hold		Swing		

=== Elections in the 1960s ===
General election 1964: Gosport and Fareham
Party	Candidate	Votes	%	±%
Conservative	Reginald Bennett	32,369	51.90	
Labour	John R Sturges	18,321	29.37	
Liberal	Eric J Barber	11,684	18.73	New
Majority		14,048	22.53	
Turnout		62,374	76.02	
Conservative hold		Swing		

General election 1966: Gosport and Fareham
Party	Candidate	Votes	%	±%
Conservative	Reginald Bennett	32,752	51.72	
Labour	John R Sturges	21,726	34.31	
Liberal	Brian V Newman	8,849	13.97	
Majority		11,026	17.41	
Turnout		63,327	75.36	
Conservative hold		Swing		

=== Elections in the 1970s ===
General election 1970: Gosport and Fareham
Party	Candidate	Votes	%	±%
Conservative	Reginald Bennett	39,234	54.30	
Labour	John R Sturges	21,262	29.43	
Liberal	Peter Irvin Smith	11,754	16.27	
Majority		17,972	24.87	
Turnout		72,250	71.72	
Conservative hold		Swing		
