= Viscount Caldecote =

Title in the Peerage of the United Kingdom

Viscountcy Caldecote
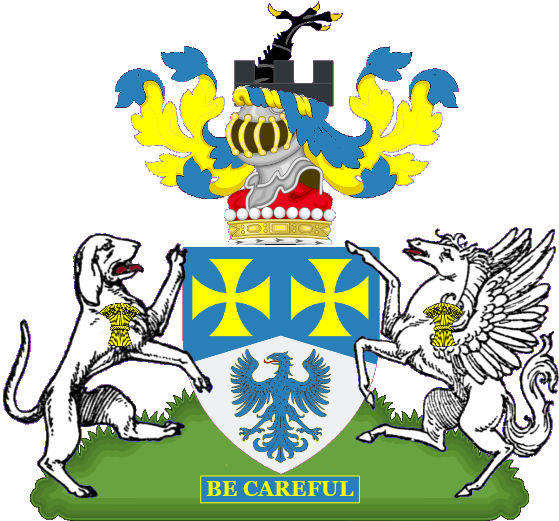
- Blazon Escutcheon: Per chevron Azure and Argent in chief two crosses pate Or and in base an eagled displayed of the first; Crest: Upon the battlements of a tower a grouse’s leg erased Proper; Supporters: On the dexter side a talbot and on the sinister side a pegasus Proper each charged on the shoulder with a garb Or.
- Creation date: 7 September 1939
- Created by: King George VI
- Peerage: Peerage of the United Kingdom
- First holder: Thomas Inskip
- Present holder: Piers Inskip
- Heir apparent: Thomas Inskip
- Remainder to: the 1st Viscount's heirs male lawfully begotten
- Status: Extant
- Motto: BE CAREFUL

Viscount Caldecote, of Bristol in the County of Gloucester, is a title in the Peerage of the United Kingdom. It was created in 1939 for the lawyer and politician Sir Thomas Inskip so that he could sit in the House of Lords and serve as Lord Chancellor. The title is currently held by his grandson, the third Viscount, who succeeded his father in 1999.

Lord Caldecote's elder half-brother the Right Reverend James Inskip was a clergyman while his younger brother Sir John Hampden Inskip (1879–1960) was Lord Mayor of Bristol in 1931.

== Viscounts Caldecote (1939) ==
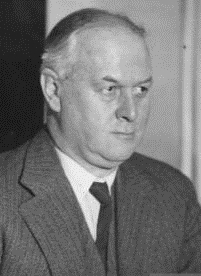
Thomas Inskip, 1st Viscount Caldecote.

- Thomas Walker Hobart Inskip, 1st Viscount Caldecote (1876–1947)
- Robert Andrew Inskip, 2nd Viscount Caldecote (1917–1999)
- Piers James Hampden Inskip, 3rd Viscount Caldecote (b. 1947)

The heir apparent is the present holder's son Hon. Thomas James Inskip (b. 1985)
