= 1931 Fareham by-election =

UK Parliamentary by-election

The 1931 Fareham by-election was held on 20 February 1931. The by-election was held due to the resignation of the incumbent Conservative MP, John Davidson. It was won by the Conservative candidate Thomas Inskip.

Fareham by-election, 1931
Party	Candidate	Votes	%	±%
Conservative	Thomas Inskip	18,749	65.6	+11.4
Labour	A.J. Pearson	6,312	22.1	0.0
Liberal	Conyngham P. Cross	3,517	12.3	−11.4
Majority		12,437	43.5	+13.0
Turnout		28,578	50.3	−17.7
Conservative hold		Swing		
