= Gingerbread (charity) =

British charity for single parent families

Gingerbread describes itself as the leading charity working with single-parent families across England and Wales. The National Council for the Unmarried Mother and her Child, founded in 1918, changed its name to the National Council for One Parent Families in the early 1970s and in 2007 merged with Gingerbread, a self-help organisation founded in 1970. After briefly being known as One Parent Families|Gingerbread, it relaunched as Gingerbread in January 2009.

The charity provides information and practical support to single parents. The charity works to improve the livelihood of single parents through advocacy and policy work, relating to employment and skills, families and relationships, living standards and poverty, and welfare.

Since 2018, Gingerbread has marked Single Parents Day on 21 March, raising awareness of the challenges faced by single parents and recognising the experiences and achievements of single-parent families in the United Kingdom. Gingerbread states that there are nearly two million single-parent families in the United Kingdom

J. K. Rowling, formerly a single parent, is the charity's President.

== History ==
=== 1918–1973: The National Council for the Unmarried Mother and her Child ===
The charity was founded in 1918 as The National Council for the Unmarried Mother and her Child (and for the Widowed or deserted Mother in Need) by Lettice Fisher. The charity had two goals: to reform the Bastardy Acts and Affiliation Order Acts laws which discriminated against illegitimate children, and to provide alternative accommodation to the workhouse for mothers and babies.

Throughout the first half of the twentieth century, the charity worked to provide practical advice and assistance to single parents. In 1963 Margaret Bramall became the director; she had first-hand experience of being a single parent following her divorce. She raised the organisation's aspirations to end discrimination and campaign for single parents' rights. The charity set up finance education schemes and training programmes to help single parents find a place in the new economy.

In 1973, the charity renamed itself as the National Council for One Parent Families.

=== 1973–2007: The National Council for One Parent Families ===
Working under a new name, the National Council for One Parent families continued to support and advocate on behalf of single parents. Margaret Bramall was able to gain influence over the Finer Report on the needs of one parent families. Many of its 230 recommendations for improving the lives of single parent families were from the 280 proposed by the National Council for One Parent Families. Bramall was disappointed by the report's impact and its "lost opportunity" and at the bureaucracy involved. It was reported that she was "eased out" of her role in 1979. In that year the organisation jointly produced a report with the Community Development Trust. Among other things, the report called for the abolition of the age of consent because the law at that time did not take into account consenting sexual relationships between young people, which resulted in pregnancies being hidden.

In 1987, the Family Law Reform Act passed, through which the Bastardy Acts and Affiliation Orders Acts are repealed, after extensive pressure from the National Council for One Parent Families.

=== 1970–2007: Gingerbread ===
Following the breakdown of her marriage, Tessa Fothergill, a single mother living in London with her two children and struggling with financial difficulties and isolation, had the idea of establishing a self-help group for others in the same position. She hit on the name "Gingerbread", suggested by the name of a café near where she lived called the "Golden Age of Gingerbread". The name seemed apposite as it chimed with one of her aims – to ginger up the authorities for more "bread" (money). An article in the Sunday Times brought hundreds of letters from others in a similar position and led to a meeting at her flat in January 1970 attended by some 10 to 15 people. At that meeting Fothergill announced that she was moving to Spain the next day and so was not able to play any part in the establishment of Gingerbread. Two women at the meeting, Angela "Gela" Day and Maria "Mim" Harper, decided to meet together to take the project forward.

The first task was to answer all the letters received. Gela Day suggested putting people in the same locality in touch with each other, partly in the hope that they could help each other with housing, Social Security (National Assistance in those days) and isolation. From this idea there grew the local Gingerbread groups that became the distinguishing feature of the organisation. Initially the base of the incipient national body was Mim Harper's flat and her telephone was the main contact point for people seeking advice or wishing to become members.

Both women had a lot of contact with the media from the start, appearing in radio and television programmes and featuring in newspaper articles. This not only generated many membership enquiries but also attracted others wishing to help at the national committee level. Three of these people, Clare Jacobs and Gail and Fred Guest, produced a large collection of information for printed leaflets and other very helpful data and facts. A couple called Val Williams and Paul Jackson joined the committee and Paul offered the use of part of a room in his Battersea office for dealing with incoming correspondence and membership applications. The need was such that many groups started to spring up throughout the country as ever more single-parents became involved and grabbed at the life-line being offered. At that time Gingerbread was the only self-help organisation offering help to all single parents.

For a time Fred Guest stepped in as caretaker chairman. Clare Jacobs was appointed treasurer and quickly established a sound book-keeping system. She also formed a good working relationship with a sympathetic firm of accountants, Leonard Finn & Co, who became Gingerbread's auditors. At the first AGM in the autumn of 1971 a national committee was elected, with Gela Day becoming chairman and Clare Jacobs confirmed as treasurer. Peter Johnson became the secretary, later succeeding Clare Jacobs as treasurer. It was also at this meeting that the initial decision not to charge fees from members who could ill afford it was confirmed. Gail and Fred Guest continued, like many others, to be active on several fronts. Others involved in national activities in the early years were Mike Stabler, Tony Barnes, Judy Chester and Sandra and Cyril Smith. A huge amount of legal advice was given in his spare time by Charters Macdonald Brown, a young lawyer. The Child Poverty Action Group also gave much-needed advice on the intricacies of benefit rules.

In the early days the running of Gingerbread was financed out of the pockets of the committee members and members within groups. However, eventually the organisation was put on a much sounder footing when what was at that time known as the Joseph Rowntree Social Service Trust offered the use of an office at 9 Poland Street in London's Soho free of charge. Grants from the Carnegie Trust and the London Boroughs Association enabled Gingerbread to employ full-time staff. Mim Harper became the first employee, while still continuing to answer the telephone to enquiries in her flat in the evenings and at weekends. She was followed by Sheila Steadman and Chrissie Dixon, and later Janet Hadley as information officer and Ruth Cohen as groups coordinator.

The main activities of the national organisation in the early years were: (1) Developing and supporting local self-help groups. (2) Providing information and advice on legal and welfare matters to parents. (3) Submitting evidence to the Finer Committee on One-Parent Families, under the guidance of Cyril Smith, a university academic and the chairman of the policy subcommittee. This evidence was published by Gingerbread in "One-Parent Families: A Finer Future?" (4) Attempting to become a registered charity, with pro bono assistance from Malcolm Bolton, a solicitor. This attempt was thwarted because Gingerbread's campaigning aims were deemed by the Charity Commission to be incompatible with charitable status. (5) Publishing "Ginger", a regular magazine for members and other interested parties.

When the gift of the Poland Street office came to an end, Gingerbread moved to 35 Wellington Street, London WC2. The organisation continued to expand and by 1978 there were over 380 groups throughout the UK, with a structure of 13 regions. The London office employed 7 staff, with 2 employees at a separately funded office in Scotland. Gingerbread was by now working more closely with the National Council for One-Parent Families.

=== 2007–2017: Merger ===
The National Council for One Parent Families and Gingerbread merged in 2007 under the name of One Parent Families|Gingerbread. It relaunched under the name Gingerbread in 2009. Head offices for Gingerbread were set up in Kentish Town, London, with satellite offices in Cardiff, Rhyl, Manchester and Accrington.

=== 2018: Centenary ===
In 2018, the charity turned 100 years old (tracing its history back to The National Council for the Unmarried Mother and her Child). As part of the centenary, the charity released a report looking at single parent families in the UK today. The report found that while great progress has been made for single parents (with employment rates at a record high), there are still many challenges to overcome as a third of children with working single parents live in poverty in the UK.

The charity describes its vision as 'a society in which single parent families are valued and treated equally and fairly.'

=== 2023: Rebrand ===
The charity launched a new brand in 2023 to put a bigger emphasis on their campaigning work, reflecting the origins of the organisation when it was set up in 1918. Their updated brand statement is 'We are Gingerbread. We're here to fight for single parents and their children.'

== Services ==
Helpline Between 2002 and 2025, Gingerbread ran a Freephone helpline offering expert advice to single parents which supported tens of thousands of single parents over two decades on any aspect of single parenting. The confidential helpline was staffed by expert advisers who were trained to give guidance on practical matters to do with money, benefits, employment issues and family law. The advice service was AQA-approved.

Membership Single parents can become members of Gingerbread for free by signing up via the Gingerbread website. Members can message other single parents on the online community, sign up to local groups and receive a monthly e-newsletter.

Local groups Some Gingerbread members run local groups offering peer support for other single parents and their families. The groups are free to join.

Online information Gingerbread offers comprehensive information for single parents on its website, as well as a number of interactive advice tools and an online community for members. The advice covers areas including child maintenance, tax credits and steps to take when a relationship ends.

Training Between 2004 and 2019, Gingerbread offered training, employability and confidence-building programmes for single parents in partnership with Marks & Spencer as part of their Marks and Start scheme which helped single parents return to the workplace.

== Lobbying and campaigns ==
Gingerbread's policy and campaign teams work with elected representatives and other policy makers to influence policy and practice on issues relating to single parents.

Gingerbread has campaigned against negative stereotyping of single parent families. Their 'Let's lose the labels' (2010) and 'Single parents: you're brilliant' (2010) campaigns both challenged stigma against single parents.

Gingerbread has campaigned against government proposals to charge parents to use the Child Support Agency, and against cuts to Legal Aid proposed by the Welfare Reform Bill. It is currently campaiging for reform of the Child Maintenance Service (CMS) and of Universal Credit (UC).

== People associated with the charity ==
- 1918-1955: Lettice Fisher, founder of the National Council for the Unmarried Mother and her Child
- 1918: Sybil Neville-Rolfe, one of the establishing members of the National Council for the Unmarried Mother and her Child
- 1962-1979: Maraget Bramall, General Secretary of the National Council for the Unmarried Mother and her Child
- 1970: Tessa Fothergill (Raga Woods), Angela Day, Maria Harper, founders of Gingerbread
- 1986-1995: Sue Slipman, Director of the National Council for One Parent Families (NCOPF), which she rallied in support of the Conservative Government's Child Support Agency.
- 1997-2000: Maeve Sherlock, Director of NCOPF
- 2000-2004: Kate Green, Director of NCOPF
- 2000: J. K. Rowling, President of Gingerbread
- 2005-2008: Chris Pond, CEO of NCOPF

== Camden Mayor's Charity, 2021–22 ==
Cllr Sabrina Francis became Camden Mayor on 4 May 2021. She grew up in Camden, attending Brecknock Primary School and Camden School for Girls before studying at Birmingham University. Having grown-up in a single parent family, Francis chose Gingerbread as her mayoral charity for 2021–22.

== Archives ==
The records of Gingerbread are held at The Women's Library at the Library of the London School of Economics, ref 5GNB
