= Election results of women in United Kingdom general elections (1918–1945) =

22 of the women standing in the 1923 general election

This is a list of women who stood in general elections to the Parliament of the United Kingdom up to and including the 1945 general election.

== Summary of general election candidates ==
Year	Number of Candidates	Number of MPs
1918	17	1
1922	33	2
1923	34	8
1924	41	4
1929	69	14
1931	62	15
1935	67	9
1945	87	24

Year	Conservative		Labour		Liberal		Independent		Other parties	
Year	Candidates	MPs	Candidates	MPs	Candidates	MPs	Candidates	MPs	Candidates	MPs
1918	1	0	4	0	4	0	5	0	3	1
1922	5	1	10	0	16	1	2	0	0	0
1923	7	3	14	3	12	2	1	0	0	0
1924	12	3	22	1	6	0	1	0	0	0
1929	10	3	30	9	25	1	1	1	3	0
1931	16	13	36	0	5	1	1	1	4	0
1935	19	6	33	1	11	1	2	1	2	0
1945	13	1	41	21	20	1	4	1	9	0

Unionist candidates or MPs in Scottish constituencies were counted as Conservatives.

== Election results ==
=== 1918 UK general election ===
Party	Constituency	Name	Votes	%	Position
Conservative	Kennington	Alice Lucas	3,573	32.2	2
Independent	Brentford and Chiswick	Ray Strachey	1,263	9.7	3
Independent	Chelsea	Emily Frost Phipps	2,419	20.9	2
Independent	Glasgow Bridgeton	Eunice Murray	991	5.0	3
Independent	Hendon	Edith How-Martyn	2,067	10.5	3
Independent	Richmond (Surrey)	Norah Dacre Fox	3,615	20.4	2
Labour	Battersea North	Charlotte Despard	5,634	33.4	2
Labour	Manchester Rusholme	Emmeline Pethick-Lawrence	2,985	15.6	3
Labour	Stourbridge	Mary Anderson	7,587	32.7	3
Labour	University of Wales	Millicent Mackenzie	176	19.2	2
Liberal	Enfield	Janet McEwan	1,987	12.1	3
Liberal	Birmingham Ladywood	Margery Corbett Ashby	1,552	11.5	3
Liberal	Mansfield	Violet Carruthers	4,000	19.5	3
Liberal	Portsmouth South	Alison Garland	4,283	18.5	2
Sinn Féin	Belfast Victoria	Winifred Carney	539	4.1	3
Sinn Féin	Dublin St Patrick's	Constance Markievicz	7,835	65.9	1
Women's Party	Smethwick	Christabel Pankhurst	8,614	47.8	2

=== By-elections, 1918-1922 ===
Party	Election	Name	Votes	%	Position
Conservative	1919 Plymouth Sutton by-election	Nancy Astor	14,495	51.9	1
Labour	1920 Camberwell North West by-election	Susan Lawrence	4,733	32.1	2
Labour	1920 Northampton by-election	Margaret Bondfield	13,279	44.4	2
Liberal	1921 Louth by-election	Margaret Wintringham	8,386	42.2	1

=== 1922 UK general election ===
Party	Constituency	Name	Votes	%	Position
Conservative	Camberwell North	Helen Gwynne-Vaughan	8,066	49.2	2
Conservative	Denbigh	Lesley Venetia Elizabeth Brodrick	9,138	37.9	2
Conservative	Ogmore	Dorothy Caroline Edmondes	6,577	20.1	3
Conservative	Plymouth Sutton	Nancy Astor	13,924	47.4	1
Conservative	Walsall	Alice Cooper	14,349	37.8	2
Independent	Brentford and Chiswick	Ray Strachey	7,804	43.5	2
Independent	Liverpool East Toxteth	Eleanor Rathbone	9,984	39.7	2
Labour	Acton	Mary Richardson	5,342	26.2	2
Labour	Chelmsford	Clara Rackham	3,767	17.6	3
Labour	East Ham North	Susan Lawrence	6,747	27.8	2
Labour	East Surrey	Marjorie Pease	3,667	22.7	2
Labour	Islington North	Edith Picton-Turbervill	7,993	27.8	2
Labour	Islington East	Ethel Bentham	5,900	22.7	3
Labour	Lambeth North	Barbara Ayrton-Gould	3,353	17.8	3
Labour	Northampton	Margaret Bondfield	14,498	37.9	2
Labour	University of Wales	Olive Wheeler	309	24.8	3
Labour Co-op	Birmingham King's Norton	Eleanor Barton	7,017	32.8	2
Liberal	Bedford	Mary Camilla Lawson	2,075	7.8	4
Liberal	Dartford	Alison Garland	2,175	6.5	3
Liberal	Devizes	Hilda Beatrice Currie	6,576	40.7	2
Liberal	Glasgow Maryhill	Annie Burnett Smith	3,617	13.1	3
Liberal	High Peak	Anna Barlow	5,802	20.4	3
Liberal	Huntingdonshire	Lina Scott Gatty	5,123	25.7	2
Liberal	Louth, Lincolnshire	Margaret Wintringham	11,609	52.0	1
Liberal	Oldham	Mary Emmott	6,186	7.0	5
Liberal	Richmond (Surrey)	Margery Corbett Ashby	5,765	24.1	3
Liberal	Waterloo	Nessie Stewart-Brown	6,300	32.7	2
Liberal	Westminster St George's	Mary Sophia Allen	1,303	6.5	3
Liberal	Wycombe	Vera Terrington	11,154	35.8	2
National Liberal	Edinburgh South	Catherine Alderton	7,408	33.3	2
National Liberal	Forest of Dean	Winifred Coombe Tennant	3,861	18.7	3
National Liberal	Glasgow Govan	Helen Fraser	9,336	37.7	2
National Liberal	Leeds South East	Mary Grant	9,554	41.1	2

=== By-elections, 1922-1923 ===
Party	Election	Name	Votes	%	Position
Conservative	1923 Berwick-upon-Tweed by-election	Mabel Philipson	12,000	55.0	1

=== 1923 UK general election ===
Party	Constituency	Name	Votes	%	Position
Conservative	Berwick-upon-Tweed	Mabel Philipson	10,636	48.0	1
Conservative	Camberwell North	Helen Gwynne-Vaughan	5,934	35.8	2
Conservative	Ince	Rachel Parsons	6,262	26.5	2
Conservative	Plymouth Sutton	Nancy Astor	16,114	54.5	1
Conservative	St Helens	Margaret Evelyn Pilkington	16,109	44.5	2
Independent	Brentford and Chiswick	Ray Strachey	4,828	27.3	2
Labour	Ashton-under-Lyne	Ellen Wilkinson	6,208	28.7	3
Labour	Berwick-upon-Tweed	Edna Penny	2,784	12.5	3
Labour	Bournemouth	Minnie Pallister	5,986	19.5	3
Labour	Chatham	Mary Agnes Hamilton	5,794	24.1	3
Labour	East Ham North	Susan Lawrence	8,727	35.7	1
Labour	Farnham	Anne Corner	3,520	16.7	3
Labour	Isle of Wight	Emily Palmer	2,475	7.1	3
Labour	Islington East	Ethel Bentham	6,941	26.0	3
Labour	Northampton	Margaret Bondfield	15,556	40.5	1
Labour	Norwich	Dorothy Jewson	19,304	20.0	2
Labour	Portsmouth South	Jessie Stephen	7,388	24.9	2
Labour	Warwick and Leamington	Countess of Warwick	4,015	12.8	3
Labour	West Dorset	Louie Simpson	7,087	41.2	2
Labour Co-op	Birmingham King's Norton	Eleanor Barton	6,743	30.7	2
Liberal	Birmingham King's Norton	Elizabeth Cadbury	5,686	25.9	3
Liberal	Birmingham Moseley	Janet Clarkson	7,904	28.7	2
Liberal	Cambridgeshire	Elsbeth Dimsdale	6,619	24.6	3
Liberal	Consett	Ursula Williams	14,619	48.0	2
Liberal	Gower	Leah Norah Folland	10,219	40.9	2
Liberal	Hamilton	Helen Fraser	8,436	41.6	2
Liberal	Hanley	Ada Rowley Moody	4,268	19.8	3
Liberal	Hastings	Maria Gordon	5,876	25.9	2
Liberal	Louth, Lincolnshire	Margaret Wintringham	12,104	52.4	1
Liberal	Pontefract	Mary Pollock Grant	4,567	18.6	3
Liberal	Richmond (Surrey)	Margery Corbett Ashby	7,702	37.0	2
Liberal	Wycombe	Lady Terrington	14,910	46.9	1
Unionist	Glasgow St Rollox	Violet Mary Robertson	9,204	37.7	2
Unionist	Kinross and Western Perthshire	Duchess of Atholl	9,235	50.4	1

Jewson was elected by taking second place in a two-seat constituency.

=== 1924 UK general election ===
Party	Constituency	Name	Votes	%	Position
Conservative	Berwick-upon-Tweed	Mabel Philipson	12,130	50.9	1
Conservative	Camberwell North	Helen Gwynne-Vaughan	7,564	36.7	2
Conservative	Denbigh	Lesley Venetia Elizabeth Brodrick	11,250	47.0	2
Conservative	Derby	Hilda Hulse	21,700	20.3	4
Conservative	Manchester Ardwick	Mary Kingsmill Jones	13,115	45.1	2
Conservative	Morpeth	Irene Ward	10,828	32.0	2
Conservative	Plymouth Sutton	Nancy Astor	18,174	58.1	1
Conservative	St Helens	Margaret Evelyn Pilkington	16,908	44.2	2
Conservative	Wansbeck	Mary Middleton	18,875	47.1	2
Independent Labour	Acton	Mary Richardson	1,775	7.6	4
Labour	Blackburn	Mary Agnes Hamilton	24,330	21.8	3
Labour	Bournemouth	Minnie Pallister	7,735	27.3	2
Labour	Chelsea	Dora Russell	5,661	26.0	2
Labour	Dumfriesshire	Agnes Dollan	6,342	23.0	3
Labour	East Ham North	Susan Lawrence	10,137	35.8	2
Labour	Edinburgh North	Eleanor Stewart	8,192	27.9	2
Labour	Farnham	Anne Corner	4,613	20.2	2
Labour	Hackney North	Stella Churchill	6,097	24.1	3
Labour	Hastings	Muriel Matters Porter	6,082	28.6	2
Labour	Hemel Hempstead	Amy Sayle	1,553	6.9	3
Labour	Islington East	Ethel Bentham	10,280	32.3	2
Labour	Lewisham West	Barbara Drake	6,781	20.4	2
Labour	Liverpool Fairfield	Mary Mercer	8,412	37.1	2
Labour	Middlesbrough East	Ellen Wilkinson	9,574	38.5	1
Labour	Northampton	Margaret Bondfield	15,046	37.2	2
Labour	Northwich	Barbara Ayrton-Gould	11,630	34.6	2
Labour	Norwich	Dorothy Jewson	22,931	22.0	4
Labour	Portsmouth South	Jessie Stephen	8,310	27.0	2
Labour	Stroud	Edith Picton-Turbervill	7,418	25.2	2
Labour	Totnes	Kate Spurrell	2,240	6.1	3
Labour	West Dorset	Louie Simpson	5,764	31.7	2
Labour Co-op	Leeds North East	Edna Penny	8,894	31.6	2
Liberal	Ilkeston	Anna Barlow	4,320	17.6	3
Liberal	Lanark	Elizabeth Buchanan Mitchell	2,126	8.1	3
Liberal	Louth, Lincolnshire	Margaret Wintringham	11,330	47.2	2
Liberal	Southwark South East	Elsie Cameron Elias	2,388	11.2	3
Liberal	Watford	Margery Corbett Ashby	5,205	18.7	3
Liberal	Wycombe	Lady Terrington	12,526	33.0	2
Unionist	Aberdeen North	Laura Sandeman	8,545	39.2	2
Unionist	Bothwell	Helen Brown Shaw	11,314	43.7	2
Unionist	Kinross and Western Perthshire	Duchess of Atholl	13,565	72.0	1

=== By-elections, 1924-1929 ===
Party	Election	Name	Votes	%	Position
Labour	1926 Wallsend by-election	Margaret Bondfield	18,866	57.7	1
Labour	1926 East Ham North by-election	Susan Lawrence	10,798	40.6	1
Conservative	1927 Southend by-election	Countess of Iveagh	21,221	54.6	1
Labour	1928 Bristol West by-election	Clare Annesley	7,702	26.0	2
Liberal	1928 St Ives by-election	Hilda Runciman	10,241	42.6	1
Unionist	1928 Linlithgowshire by-election	Margaret Kidd	9,268	31.5	2
Labour	1928 Epsom by-election	Helen Keynes	3,719	16.8	3
Unionist	1928 Aberdeen North by-election	Laura Sandeman	4,696	23.1	2
Labour	1928 Cheltenham by-election	Florence Widdowson	3,962	18.8	3
Labour	1929 Bishop Auckland by-election	Ruth Dalton	14,797	57.1	1
Labour	1929 North Lanarkshire by-election	Jennie Lee	15,711	57.5	1
Liberal	1929 North Lanarkshire by-election	Elizabeth Buchanan Mitchell	2,488	9.1	3

=== 1929 UK general election ===
Party	Constituency	Name	Votes	%	Position
Communist	Bothwell	Helen Crawfurd	1,677	5.5	3
Communist	Mansfield	Rose Smith	533	1.1	4
Communist	Motherwell	Isabel Brown	984	3.4	4
Conservative	Farnworth	Mary Pickford	10,643	25.4	2
Conservative	Liverpool Everton	Margaret Beavan	12,667	47.1	2
Conservative	Manchester Ardwick	Mary Kingsmill Jones	13,177	39.7	2
Conservative	Morpeth	Irene Ward	9,206	22.1	2
Conservative	Plymouth Sutton	Nancy Astor	16,625	43.2	1
Conservative	Pontypridd	May Gordon Williams	3,967	10.1	3
Conservative	Southend-on-Sea	Countess of Iveagh	27,605	55.8	1
Independent	Combined English Universities	Eleanor Rathbone	3,331	33.3	2
Labour	Ayr Burghs	Clarice Shaw	13,429	36.5	2
Labour	Blackburn	Mary Agnes Hamilton	37,256	26.1	1
Labour	Brentford and Chiswick	Stella Churchill	10,918	37.8	2
Labour	Bristol West	Clare Annesley	11,961	25.3	2
Labour	East Ham North	Susan Lawrence	13,969	42.1	1
Labour	Edinburgh North	Eleanor Stewart	11,340	32.2	2
Labour	Honiton	Rose Davies	915	2.6	3
Labour	Horsham and Worthing	Helen Keynes	7,611	16.4	3
Labour	Hythe	Grace Colman	2,597	11.5	3
Labour	Islington East	Ethel Bentham	15,199	38.0	1
Labour	Lewisham West	Catherine Mary Wadham	10,598	25.9	2
Labour	Luton	Florence Harrison Bell	7,351	16.5	3
Labour	Middlesbrough East	Ellen Wilkinson	12,215	41.3	1
Labour	North Lanarkshire	Jennie Lee	19,884	55.9	1
Labour	Northwich	Barbara Ayrton-Gould	15,473	34.3	2
Labour	Norwich	Dorothy Jewson	31,040	24.0	3
Labour	Nottingham Central	Eleanor Barton	11,573	33.2	2
Labour	Perth	Helen Gault	8,291	23.5	3
Labour	Petersfield	Gertrude Massingham	3,418	12.1	3
Labour	Portsmouth South	Jessie Stephen	10,127	24.8	2
Labour	Rushcliffe	Florence Widdowson	16,069	35.0	2
Labour	St Albans	Monica Whately	11,699	27.6	2
Labour	Stoke-on-Trent	Cynthia Mosley	26,548	58.7	1
Labour	Sunderland	Marion Phillips	31,794	19.5	1
Labour	The Wrekin	Edith Picton-Turbervill	14,569	44.4	1
Labour	Totnes	Kate Spurrell	5,828	12.9	3
Labour	Wallsend	Margaret Bondfield	20,057	49.5	1
Labour	Wells	Ruby Davies	4,472	15.0	3
Labour	Weston-super-Mare	Constance Borrett	4,766	11.1	3
Labour	Wycombe	Rochelle Townsend	8,899	18.1	3
Liberal	Anglesey	Megan Lloyd George	13,181	49.4	1
Liberal	Birmingham Deritend	Beta Hornabrook	2,268	6.8	3
Liberal	Caerphilly	Alice Grace Roberts	8,190	22.4	2
Liberal	East Grinstead	Barbara Bliss	9,718	25.6	2
Liberal	Hackney South	Muriel Morgan Gibbon	6,302	20.7	3
Liberal	Hendon	Margery Corbett Ashby	13,449	22.2	3
Liberal	Hitchin	Enid Lapthorn	9,325	28.3	2
Liberal	Hythe	Hester Lloyd Holland	6,912	30.7	2
Liberal	Islington North	Domini Crosfield	10,210	23.4	3
Liberal	Kensington North	Frances Henrietta Stewart	5,516	13.5	3
Liberal	Kingston upon Hull North West	Catherine Alderton	10,059	28.3	3
Liberal	Louth, Lincolnshire	Margaret Wintringham	13,560	42.9	2
Liberal	Manchester Gorton	Beatrice Bayfield	3,385	9.4	3
Liberal	North Norfolk	Zelia Hoffman	3,403	11.1	3
Liberal	Northampton	Helen Schilizzi	11,054	20.6	3
Liberal	Rotherhithe	Dora West	4,556	19.1	3
Liberal	St Pancras South East	Elizabeth Edwardes	3,798	13.8	3
Liberal	Salford West	Mary Pollock Grant	5,614	15.4	3
Liberal	Salisbury	Lucy Masterman	13,022	39.3	2
Liberal	Smethwick	Maude Egerton Marshall	3,909	11.0	3
Liberal	Sunderland	Elizabeth Morgan	21,300	13.0	5
Liberal	Surrey East	Ida Swinburne	7,435	23.1	2
Liberal	Tavistock	Hilda Runciman	14,040	44.1	2
Liberal	Warrington	Alison Garland	3,070	7.2	3
Liberal	Winchester	Frances Josephy	7,278	18.6	3
Unionist	Bothwell	Helen Brown Shaw	12,077	39.3	2
Unionist	Kinross and Western Perthshire	Duchess of Atholl	12,245	48.6	1
Unionist	Paisley	Minna Cowan	7,094	17.7	3

Rathbone was elected by taking second place in a two-seat constituency.

=== By-elections, 1929-1931 ===
Party	Election	Name	Votes	%	Position
Communist	1929 Kilmarnock by-election	Isabel Brown	1,448	4.4	3
Labour	1930 North Norfolk by-election	Lucy Noel-Buxton	14,821	50.3	1
Labour	1930 Paddington South by-election	Dorothy Evans	7,944	26.6	3
United Empire	1930 Paddington South by-election	Alexandra Stewart-Richardson	494	1.7	4
Labour	1931 Islington East by-election	Leah Manning	10,591	34.7	1
Conservative	1931 Islington East by-election	Thelma Cazalet	7,182	23.5	3
Liberal	1931 Salisbury by-election	Lucy Masterman	9,588	32.7	2
Liberal	1931 Sunderland by-election	Elizabeth Morgan	15,020	19.9	3
National (Scotland)	1931 Glasgow St Rollox by-election	Elma Campbell	3,521	15.8	3

=== 1931 UK general election ===
Party	Constituency	Name	Votes	%	Position
Communist	Aberdeen North	Helen Crawfurd	3,980	11.1	3
Communist	Greenwich	Kath Duncan	2,024	4.4	4
Conservative	Caerphilly	Catherine Bowen-Davies	11,044	32.4	2
Conservative	Cannock	Sarah Ward	27,498	54.6	1
Conservative	Hackney South	Marjorie Graves	15,920	55.4	1
Conservative	Hammersmith North	Mary Pickford	18,815	59.2	1
Conservative	Islington East	Thelma Cazalet	27,221	67.5	1
Conservative	Plymouth Sutton	Nancy Astor	24,277	63.3	1
Conservative	Rotherhithe	Norah Runge	11,666	50.3	1
Conservative	Silvertown	Eleonora Tennant	5,654	22.2	2
Conservative	Southend-on-Sea	Countess of Iveagh	46,564	85.7	1
Conservative	Stoke	Ida Copeland	19,918	45.6	1
Conservative	Wallsend	Irene Ward	25,999	58.6	1
Conservative	Willesden West	Mavis Tate	23,910	60.6	1
Independent	Combined English Universities	Eleanor Rathbone	5,096	37.2	1
Ind. Labour Party	Camborne	Kate Spurrell	8,280	24.5	3
Ind. Labour Party	Clapham	Hilda Browning	7,317	23.0	2
Ind. Labour Party	North Lanarkshire	Jennie Lee	19,691	44.7	2
Ind. Labour Party	Norwich	Dorothy Jewson	26,537	19.7	4
Ind. Labour Party	Perth	Helen Gault	3,705	9.7	3
Ind. Labour Party	West Renfrewshire	Jean Mann	10,203	31.5	2
Independent Liberal	Anglesey	Megan Lloyd George	14,839	58.3	1
Labour	Aldershot	Mary Richardson	4,091	15.6	2
Labour	Aylesbury	Dorothy Woodman	4,677	10.9	3
Labour	Ayr Burghs	Clarice Shaw	9,974	26.1	2
Labour	Bedford	Clare Annesley	9,654	27.8	2
Labour	Blackburn	Mary Agnes Hamilton	25,643	17.0	3
Labour	East Ham North	Susan Lawrence	11,769	34.1	2
Labour	Flintshire	Frances Edwards	16,158	28.6	2
Labour	Gillingham	Catherine Mary Wadham	9,103	31.0	2
Labour	Hastings	Irene Goddard	4,983	15.5	2
Labour	Hendon	Amber Blanco White	15,305	18.8	2
Labour	Horsham and Worthing	Helen Keynes	5,932	11.7	2
Labour	Hythe	Grace Colman	3,608	15.1	2
Labour	Islington East	Leah Manning	13,111	32.5	2
Labour	Kidderminster	Jessie Stephen	9,814	22.7	2
Labour	Maidstone	Gertrude Speedwell Massingham	6,770	19.8	2
Labour	Middlesbrough East	Ellen Wilkinson	12,080	39.6	2
Labour	North Norfolk	Lucy Noel-Buxton	13,035	39.5	2
Labour	Northwich	Barbara Gould	15,746	34.4	2
Labour	Norwood	Ann Jane Anstey	7,217	19.0	2
Labour	Paddington North	Esther Rickards	9,597	28.6	2
Labour	Paddington South	Lucy Cox	4,532	14.3	2
Labour	Rushcliffe	Florence Paton	14,176	27.9	2
Labour	St Albans	Monica Whately	10,289	21.9	2
Labour	Streatham	Betty Fraser	5,343	15.0	2
Labour	Sunderland	Marion Phillips	29,707	18.0	3
Labour	The Wrekin	Edith Picton-Turbervill	14,162	38.9	2
Labour	Tonbridge	Constance Borrett	8,208	21.2	2
Labour	Wallsend	Margaret Bondfield	18,393	41.4	2
Labour	Woodbridge	Ida Mary Nussey Keeble	5,885	18.7	2
Labour Co-op	Brighton	Rosalind Moore	12,878	7.3	4
Liberal	Basingstoke	Frances Josephy	6,106	18.1	2
Liberal	Exeter	Eleanor Acland	8,571	23.2	2
Liberal	Holderness	Aline MacKinnon	10,471	30.0	2
Liberal	Shrewsbury	Betty Morgan	9,358	30.8	2
National Liberal	Wentworth	Charlotte Isabel Hilyer	14,462	31.2	2
National (Scotland)	Glasgow St Rollox	Elma Campbell	3,521	13.3	3
Unionist	Bothwell	Helen Brown Shaw	16,571	50.0	1
Unionist	Dundee	Florence Horsbrugh	48,556	27.7	2
Unionist	Glasgow Bridgeton	Catherine Gavin	11,941	41.8	2
Unionist	Kinross and Western Perthshire	Duchess of Atholl	16,228	60.6	1

Horsbrugh was elected by taking second place in a two-seat constituency.

=== By-elections, 1931-1935 ===
Party	Election	Name	Votes	%	Position
Labour	1932 Dulwich by-election	Helen Bentwich	3,905	19.3	3
Independent	1934 Lambeth North by-election	Alice Brown	305	1.6	4
Labour	1934 Putney by-election	Edith Summerskill	12,936	45.3	2
Labour	1935 Norwood by-election	Barbara Gould	12,799	40.4	2
Labour	1935 Perth by-election	Helen Gault	3,705	9.7	3
Labour	1935 Combined Scottish Universities by-election	Naomi Mitchison	4,293	17.3	2

=== 1935 UK general election ===
Party	Constituency	Name	Votes	%	Position
Conservative	Caerphilly	Nesta Jessie Stoneham	7,738	23.8	2
Conservative	Cannock	Sarah Ward	26,876	49.1	2
Conservative	Clay Cross	Bridget Jackson	8,391	25.4	2
Conservative	Ebbw Vale	Ethel Scarborough	7,145	22.2	2
Conservative	Frome	Mavis Tate	19,684	46.3	1
Conservative	Hackney South	Marjorie Graves	10,876	40.7	2
Conservative	Islington East	Thelma Cazalet	18,248	52.5	1
Conservative	Plaistow	Dorothy Roddick	6,730	26.7	2
Conservative	Plymouth Sutton	Nancy Astor	21,491	58.3	1
Conservative	Poplar South	Diana Spearman	6,862	26.8	2
Conservative	Rotherhithe	Norah Runge	9,751	40.3	2
Conservative	Rothwell	Gwendoline Beaumont	17,352	35.5	2
Conservative	Silvertown	Eleonora Tennant	4,276	19.0	2
Conservative	Stoke	Ida Copeland	18,867	47.3	2
Conservative	Wallsend	Irene Ward	23,842	52.6	1
Independent	Combined English Universities	Eleanor Rathbone	unopposed	N/A	1
Independent	Putney	Violet Van der Elst	1,021	3.0	3
Ind. Labour Party	Camborne	Kate Spurrell	592	1.9	4
Ind. Labour Party	North Lanarkshire	Jennie Lee	17,267	37.3	2
Labour	Birkenhead East	Mary Mercer	8,028	23.3	3
Labour	Bradford North	Muriel Nichol	14,047	35.2	2
Labour	Burton	Gladys Paling	8,041	25.5	2
Labour	Bury	Edith Summerskill	12,845	34.4	2
Labour	Cheltenham	Elizabeth Pakenham	7,784	29.5	2
Labour	City of Chester	Agnes Bulley	6,450	19.3	3
Labour	Clapham	Monica Whately	11,368	23.0	2
Labour	Dartford	Janet Adamson	35,596	48.2	2
Labour	Darwen	Frances Kerby	7,778	20.9	3
Labour	Edinburgh South	Barbara Woodburn	5,365	16.5	2
Labour	Harrow	Helen Bentwich	31,422	37.3	2
Labour	Hendon	Amber Blanco White	28,375	26.8	2
Labour	Hornsey	Mari Power	10,320	21.9	2
Labour	Jarrow	Ellen Wilkinson	20,324	53.1	1
Labour	Lewisham East	Freda Corbet	25,425	44.6	2
Labour	Manchester Hulme	Barbara Ayrton-Gould	11,221	39.7	2
Labour	New Forest and Christchurch	Catherine Mary Wadham	10,876	25.2	2
Labour	North Dorset	M. M. Whitehead	1,360	5.2	4
Labour	North Norfolk	Lucy Noel-Buxton	14,465	44.7	2
Labour	Paddington North	Caroline Ganley	9,925	34.4	2
Labour	Pudsey and Otley	Lucy Cox	9,997	23.3	3
Labour	Saffron Walden	Clara Rackham	9,633	32.9	2
Labour	St Marylebone	Elizabeth Jacobs	8,088	20.4	2
Labour	Sheffield Hallam	Grace Colman	10,346	32.7	2
Labour	Southend-on-Sea	Helen Keynes	7,796	13.8	3
Labour	Stockton-on-Tees	Susan Lawrence	19,217	40.3	2
Labour	Stroud	Constance Borrett	14,133	36.8	2
Labour	Sunderland	Leah Manning	32,059	19.8	4
Labour	Wallsend	Margaret Bondfield	21,462	47.4	2
Labour	Westminster St George's	Anne Fremantle	4,643	15.4	2
Labour	Westmorland	Evelyn Short	10,417	31.5	2
Labour	West Renfrewshire	Jean Mann	12,407	38.8	2
Labour	Wood Green	Dorothy Woodman	14,561	24.8	2
Liberal	Anglesey	Megan Lloyd George	11,227	44.5	1
Liberal	Aylesbury	Margaret Wintringham	13,622	31.6	2
Liberal	Carlisle	Barbara Bliss	3,525	10.3	3
Liberal	Devizes	Frances Josephy	9,903	40.7	2
Liberal	Edinburgh North	Chrystal Macmillan	1,798	5.8	3
Liberal	Hemel Hempstead	Margery Corbett Ashby	7,078	22.0	2
Liberal	Holderness	Aline Mackinnon	10,348	24.9	2
Liberal	Kinross and Western Perthshire	Elizabeth MacDonald	10,069	39.8	2
Liberal	Maldon	Hilda Buckmaster	5,680	17.7	3
Liberal	Rye	Dorothy Osborn	9,162	28.8	2
Liberal	Willesden East	Nancy Stewart Parnell	3,217	7.3	3
Unionist	Bothwell	Helen Brown Shaw	13,761	39.7	2
Unionist	Dundee	Florence Horsbrugh	50,542	26.8	1
Unionist	Edinburgh East	Minna Cowan	12,229	39.6	2
Unionist	Kinross and Western Perthshire	Duchess of Atholl	15,238	60.2	1

=== By-elections, 1935-1945 ===
Party	Election	Name	Votes	%	Position
Conservative	1936 Clay Cross by-election	Bridget Jackson	8,042	24.9	2
Independent	1936 Preston by-election	Florence White	3,221	4.8	3
Conservative	1937 Hemel Hempstead by-election	Frances Davidson	14,992	57.7	1
Liberal	1937 Hemel Hempstead by-election	Margery Corbett Ashby	7,078	22.0	2
Labour	1937 Glasgow Springburn by-election	Agnes Hardie	14,859	62.6	1
National Liberal	1938 Pontypridd by-election	Juliet Rhys-Williams	14,810	40.1	2
Independent	1938 Combined Scottish Universities by-election	Frances Melville	5,618	19.5	2
Labour	1938 Fulham West by-election	Edith Summerskill	16,583	52.2	1
Labour	1938 Dartford by-election	Jennie Adamson	46,514	52.4	1
Labour	1938 Fylde by-election	Mabel Tylecote	17,648	31.6	2
Independent	1938 Kinross and Western Perthshire by-election	Duchess of Atholl	10,495	47.1	2
Liberal	1939 Holderness by-election	Aline Mackinnon	11,590	25.7	2
Unionist	1939 South Ayrshire by-election	Catherine Gavin	12,986	42.0	2
National	1940 Southwark Central by-election	Violet van der Elst	1,382	16.8	3
Ind. Labour Party	1940 East Renfrewshire by-election	Annie Maxton	8,206	19.3	2
Communist	1940 Bow and Bromley by-election	Isabel Brown	506	4.2	2
Conservative	1941 Bodmin by-election	Beatrice Wright	unopposed	N/A	1
Independent	1941 Harrow by-election	Winifred Henney	3,433	19.1	2
Common Wealth	1943 Ashford by-election	Catherine Williamson	4,192	30.3	2
Conservative	1943 Bristol Central by-election	Violet Bathurst	5,867	52.1	1
Independent Labour	1943 Bristol Central by-election	Jennie Lee	4,308	38.2	2
Common Wealth	1943 The Hartlepools by-election	Elaine Burton	3,634	17.4	2
Independent Liberal	1943 Darwen by-election	Honor Balfour	8,799	49.8	2
Independent	1943 Acton by-election	Dorothy Crisp	707	8.5	3
Independent Liberal	1944 Bury St Edmunds by-election	Margery Corbett Ashby	9,121	43.8	2

=== 1945 UK general election ===
Party	Constituency	Name	Votes	%	Position
Common Wealth	Canterbury	Catherine Williamson	1,017	2.6	3
Common Wealth	Chelsea	Dorothy Sharpe	984	5.2	3
Common Wealth	North Midlothian	Kitty Wintringham	3,299	6.4	3
Common Wealth	Sutton Coldfield	Joyce Purser	2,043	4.2	3
Communist	Birmingham Handsworth	Jessie Eden	1,390	3.4	5
Communist	Harrow East	Gladys Driver	3,493	5.9	4
Conservative	Bristol Central	Violet Bathurst	7,369	36.1	2
Conservative	Frome	Mavis Tate	24,228	44.9	2
Conservative	Islington East	Thelma Cazalet-Keir	9,960	34.5	2
Conservative	Hemel Hempstead	Frances Davidson	19,536	44.2	1
Conservative	Kingston upon Hull Central	Diana Spearman	4,106	27.5	2
Conservative	Manchester Ardwick	Nellie Beer	8,093	36.0	2
Conservative	Rotherhithe	Norah Runge	2,577	20.9	2
Conservative	Wallsend	Irene Ward	21,319	39.9	2
Conservative	Wentworth	Aymée Lavender Gandar Dower	8,670	16.4	2
Independent	Combined English Universities	Eleanor Rathbone	11,176	53.3	1
Independent	Hornchurch	Violet Van der Elst	232	0.5	4
Independent	Westminster St George's	Dorothy Crisp	1,069	5.5	3
Ind. Conservative	Putney	Eleonora Tennant	144	0.4	5
Independent Progressive	London University	Mary Danvers Stocks	7,469	49.5	2
Labour Co-op	Battersea South	Caroline Ganley	19,275	61.5	1
Labour Co-op	Birmingham Duddeston	Edith Agnes Wills	10,745	65.0	1
Labour Co-op	Ilford North	Mabel Ridealgh	18,833	42.8	1
Labour	Basingstoke	Edith Alice Weston	13,763	33.8	2
Labour	Bath	Dorothy Archibald	18,120	39.2	2
Labour	Bexley	Jennie Adamson	24,686	56.9	1
Labour	Blackburn	Barbara Castle	35,145	26.0	2
Labour	Bradford North	Muriel Nichol	20,268	43.6	1
Labour	Bury St Edmunds	Cecily Alicia McCall	9,195	29.8	2
Labour	Camberwell North West	Freda Corbet	12,251	69.6	1
Labour	Cannock	Jennie Lee	48,849	62.6	1
Labour	Chelsea	Margaret Douglas Shufeldt	5,874	31.1	2
Labour	Cheltenham	Phyllis Maude Warner	11,095	29.9	2
Labour	Chichester	Rosalie Francesca Chamberlayne	13,670	24.1	2
Labour	Coatbridge	Jean Mann	18,619	61.1	1
Labour	Croydon North	Marion Billson	22,810	40.1	2
Labour	Epping	Leah Manning	15,993	44.1	1
Labour	Flintshire	Eirene Lloyd Jones	26,761	37.4	2
Labour	Fulham West	Edith Summerskill	19,537	61.9	1
Labour	Harrow West	Joan Thompson	18,961	33.0	2
Labour	Hemel Hempstead	Doris Mobbs	14,426	32.6	2
Labour	Hendon North	Barbara Gould	18,251	47.6	1
Labour	Hendon South	Elaine Burton	14,917	38.1	2
Labour	Holborn	Irene Marcousé	5,136	45.9	2
Labour	Jarrow	Ellen Wilkinson	22,656	66.0	1
Labour	Kensington South	Patricia Strauss	6,014	18.9	2
Labour	Kilmarnock	Clarice Shaw	23,837	59.4	1
Labour	Leeds North East	Alice Bacon	28,870	53.1	1
Labour	Liverpool Exchange	Bessie Braddock	8,494	52.0	1
Labour	Middleton and Prestwich	Mabel Tylecote	25,908	49.2	2
Labour	Newbury	Iris Brook	15,754	33.7	2
Labour	North Lanarkshire	Margaret Herbison	30,251	59.6	1
Labour	Norwich	Lucy Noel-Buxton	31,553	27.9	1
Labour	Plymouth Sutton	Lucy Middleton	15,417	51.6	1
Labour	Rushcliffe	Florence Paton	43,303	54.2	1
Labour	St Marylebone	Elizabeth Jacobs	10,740	32.4	2
Labour	Sutton and Cheam	Helen Judd	17,293	41.0	2
Labour	Tonbridge	Vera Dart	16,590	35.9	2
Labour	Tynemouth	Grace Colman	13,963	46.1	1
Labour	Windsor	Marjorie Nicholson	16,420	33.1	2
Labour	Wirral	Agnes Bulley	25,919	31.3	2
Liberal	Anglesey	Megan Lloyd George	12,610	52.2	1
Liberal	Barnet	Jean Henderson	4,495	11.4	3
Liberal	Birmingham Handsworth	Barbara Lewis	4,945	12.0	4
Liberal	Blackburn	Marjorie Annie MacInerney	6,096	4.5	6
Liberal	Chelmsford	Hilda Buckmaster	5,909	10.1	3
Liberal	Darwen	Honor Balfour	7,979	24.3	3
Liberal	Devizes	Frances Josephy	6,278	23.1	3
Liberal	Exeter	Freda Evelyn Griffith Morgan	6,220	16.4	3
Liberal	Hackney North	Doreen Gorsky	3,546	13.3	3
Liberal	Ilford North	Juliet Rhys-Williams	9,128	20.8	3
Liberal	Isle of Wight	May O'Conor	5,967	12.6	3
Liberal	Mossley	Marjorie Wainwright Jalland	7,128	12.4	3
Liberal	Paisley	Louise Glen-Coats	4,532	10.0	3
Liberal	Plymouth Sutton	Joan Gaved	3,695	12.4	3
Liberal	Ripon	Mabel Cowley	6,122	12.6	3
Liberal	St Albans	Enid Lakeman	5,601	10.7	3
Liberal	St Pancras South East	Audrey Blackman	1,474	8.8	3
Liberal	Sevenoaks	Nelia Muspratt	6,906	16.7	3
Liberal	Sudbury	Margaret Hitchcock	5,045	20.5	3
Liberal	Wells	Violet Bonham-Carter	7,910	25.1	3
National Liberal	Poplar South	Joan Vickers	1,403	10.8	2
Plaid Cymru	University of Wales	Gwenan Jones	1,696	24.5	2
Unionist	Aberdeen North	Priscilla Buchan	9,623	25.1	2
Unionist	Bothwell	Helen Brown Shaw	13,207	34.2	2
Unionist	Dundee	Florence Horsbrugh	32,309	18.9	4
UUP	Fermanagh and Tyrone	Noreen Cooper	46,260	22.8	4

Castle won in Blackburn by taking second place in a two-seat constituency.

== See also ==
- List of female members of the House of Commons of the United Kingdom
- Parliament (Qualification of Women) Act 1918
- Women in the House of Commons of the United Kingdom
