= Elizabeth Morgan =

Elizabeth Morgan may refer to:

- Elizabeth Morgan (actress) (born 1930), Welsh film, television, and onstage actress
- Elizabeth Morgan (politician) (1904–1981), Welsh Liberal Party politician
- Elizabeth Morgan (surgeon), beneficiary of the Elizabeth Morgan Act
- Elizabeth Morgan, Marchioness of Anglesey (1924–2017), British writer
- Elizabeth Chambers Morgan (1850–1944), socialist labor activist

== See also ==
- Beth Morgan (disambiguation)
- Betty Morgan (disambiguation)
- Betsy Morgan (disambiguation)
