= Betty Morgan =

Betty Morgan may refer to:

- Betty Morgan (politician) (1904–1981), Welsh author and politician
- Betty Morgan (bowls) (born 1942), Welsh bowler
- Betty Morgan (singer) (fl. 1920–1931), American jazz singer
- Betty Morgan, character in Teenagers from Outer Space, played by Dawn Bender

== See also ==
- Elizabeth Morgan (disambiguation)
- Betsy Morgan (disambiguation)
