= 1929 North Lanarkshire by-election =

UK parliamentary by-election

- 21 March 1929
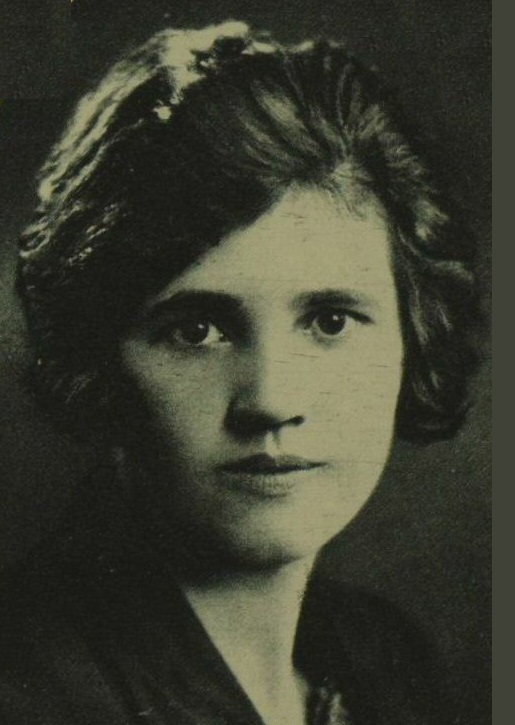

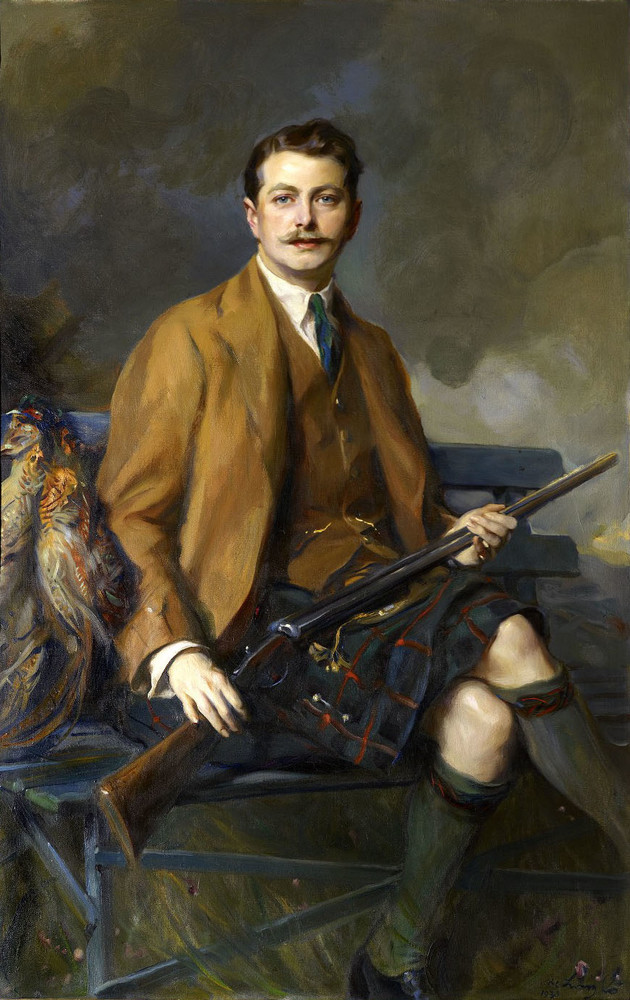

Candidate	Jennie Lee	Lord Scone	Elizabeth Mitchell
Party	Labour	Unionist	Liberal
Popular vote	15,711	9,133	2,488
Percentage	57.5%	33.4%	9.1%
MP before election
Sir Alexander Sprot
Unionist
Subsequent MP
Jennie Lee
Labour

The 1929 North Lanarkshire by-election was a parliamentary by-election held in the United Kingdom on 21 March 1929 for the House of Commons constituency of North Lanarkshire in Scotland.

== Vacancy ==
The by-election was caused by the death on 8 February of the constituency's Unionist Member of Parliament, Sir Alexander Sprot, who had gained the seat from Labour at the 1924 general election.

== History ==
General election, 29 October 1924: North Lanarkshire
Party	Candidate	Votes	%	±%
Unionist	Alexander Sprot	13,880	53.9	+19.6
Labour	Joseph Sullivan	11,852	46.1	−4.4
Majority		2,028	7.8	N/A
Turnout		25,732	79.9	+14.6
Unionist gain from Labour		Swing	+12.0	

== Candidates ==
- The Unionists selected 29-year-old Mungo Murray (later Lord Scone) to defend the seat. He was the son of Lord Mansfield. A graduate of the University of Oxford, he had served in the Black Watch and stood for parliament for the first time.
- The Labour Party needed to select a new candidate as their last candidate, the former MP, Joseph Sullivan, had been elected at the 1926 Bothwell by-election. Sullivan had been a prominent figure in the Lanarkshire Miners Association and the local Labour Party would have liked to have chosen another miners' representative. However, they settled on Jennie Lee, a teacher from Fife and a graduate of Edinburgh University, who stood for parliament for the first time.

Elizabeth Mitchell

- The local Liberal Association selected 49-year-old Elizabeth Mitchell as their candidate. She had contested Lanark at the 1924 general election, and was the daughter of Andrew Mitchell, a former sheriff of Lanarkshire and a member of Lanarkshire Education Authority. She had been educated at St. George's School for Girls, Edinburgh, Edinburgh University, and Oxford University, and taught at the Royal Holloway College, University of London. She was honorary secretary to the Committee on Women in Agriculture in Scotland, convener of Continuation classes at the County of Lanark, and vice-president of the Scottish Liberal Federation.

== Campaign ==
On 1 March, nationally, Liberal leader, David Lloyd George launched the Liberal programme for the upcoming General Election, titled We Can Conquer Unemployment.

== Result ==
The Labour Party gained the seat.

North Lanarkshire by-election, 1929
Party	Candidate	Votes	%	±%
Labour	Jennie Lee	15,711	57.5	+11.4
Unionist	Lord Scone	9,133	33.4	−20.5
Liberal	Elizabeth Buchanan Mitchell	2,488	9.1	New
Majority		6,578	24.1	N/A
Turnout		27,332	82.3	+2.4
Labour gain from Unionist		Swing	+16.0	

== Aftermath ==
General election, 30 May 1929: North Lanarkshire
Party	Candidate	Votes	%	±%
Labour	Jennie Lee	19,884	55.9	+9.8
Unionist	Mungo Murray	15,680	44.1	−9.8
Majority		4,204	11.8	N/A
Turnout		35,564	78.6	−1.3
Labour hold		Swing	+9.8	
