= Robert McLaren (politician) =

British politician

Robert McLaren (17 December 1856 – 22 April 1940) was Unionist MP for North Lanarkshire (UK Parliament constituency) from 1918 to 1922. He was a supporter of David Lloyd George's coalition government.

McLaren was educated at Rawyards Public School, Airdrie and Gartsherrie Science and Art School, Coatbridge. He was mining lecturer, colliery manager, and inspector of mines in Scotland. He was a president of the Mining Institute of Scotland and a vice-president of the Federated Institute of Mining Engineers.

He was a member of the Lanarkshire Education Authority from 1924 until 1928.

He was an honorary member of the Institution of Mining Engineers.

Parliament of the United Kingdom
New title	Member of Parliament for North Lanarkshire; 1918–1922	Succeeded by Joseph Sullivan
