= Betsy Morgan =

Betsy Morgan may refer to:

- 'The Two Faces of Betsy Morgan', episode on List of T. J. Hooker episodes
- Betsy Morgan, president of TheBlaze
- Betsy Morgan (actress) in Return to El Salvador

== See also ==
- Elizabeth Morgan (disambiguation)
- Betty Morgan (disambiguation)
