= William Adamson (Cannock MP) =

British politician

Adamson in December 1924.

William Murdoch Adamson (1 January 1881 – 25 October 1945) was a British Labour politician.

He was a National Officer of the Transport and General Workers' Union. In 1902 he married Jennie Johnston, later Member of Parliament for Dartford and Bexley.

He was Labour Member of Parliament (MP) for Cannock, in Staffordshire from 1922 to 1931 and from 1935 to 1945. He served in government as a Lord Commissioner of HM Treasury from 1941 to 1944.

Parliament of the United Kingdom
Preceded by James Parker	Member of Parliament for Cannock; 1922–1931	Succeeded by Sarah Ward
Preceded by Sarah Ward	Member of Parliament for Cannock; 1935–1945	Succeeded by Jennie Lee
