= William Mann (rugby union) =

England international rugby union player

William Mann DSO
- Full name: William Edgar Mann
- Born: 19 January 1885 Edmonton, London, England
- Died: 14 February 1969 (aged 84) Blyth, Suffolk, England

Rugby union career
- Position: Forward
International career
Years	Team	Apps	(Points)
1911	England	3	(3)

William Edgar Mann (19 January 1885 – 14 February 1969) was an English international rugby union player.

Born in Edmonton, Mann was the second son of Sir Edward Mann, 1st Baronet, and attended Marlborough College.

Mann, a forward, played rugby for United Services and was capped three times for England in the 1911 Five Nations Championship, missing the final fixture through injury.

A graduate of the Royal Military Academy, Mann served in the Guards Division of the Royal Artillery in World War I, during which he was mentioned in dispatches three times and awarded with the Distinguished Service Order.

Mann married a daughter of Scottish Unionist politician Alexander Sprot.

== See also ==
- List of England national rugby union players
