= Alexander Sprot =

British politician

Colonel Sir Alexander Sprot Bt CMG DL
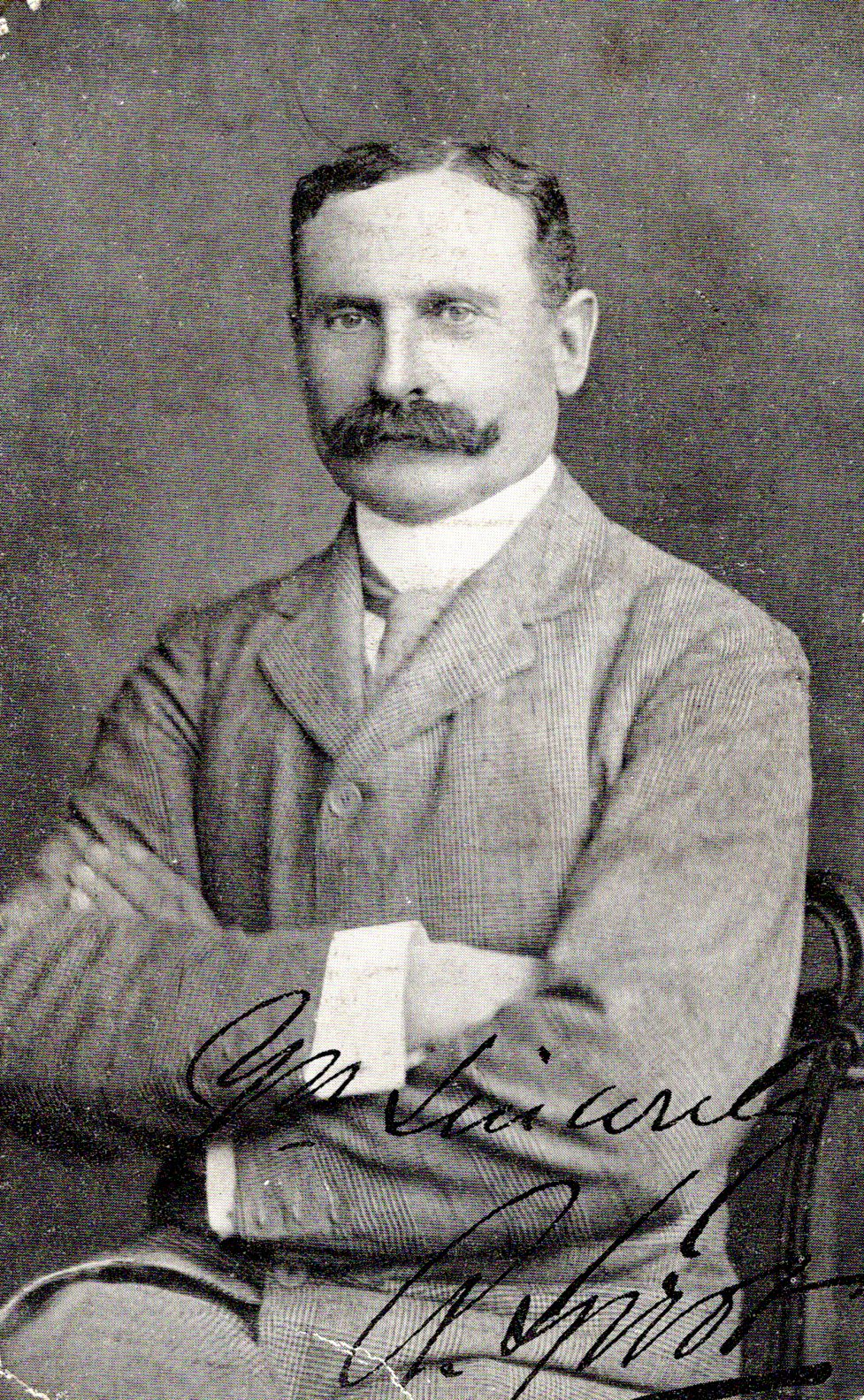
- Picture of Col. Sprot taken for election, c. 1906

Member of Parliament for East Fife
- In office 14 December 1918 – 26 October 1922
- Preceded by: H. H. Asquith
- Succeeded by: James Duncan Millar

Member of Parliament for North Lanarkshire
- In office 29 October 1924 – 8 February 1929
- Preceded by: Joseph Sullivan
- Succeeded by: Jennie Lee

Personal details
- Born: 24 April 1853
- Died: 8 February 1929 (aged 75)
- Party: Scottish Unionist
- Education: Harrow School; Trinity College, Cambridge

Sir Alexander Sprot, 1st Baronet, CMG, DL (24 April 1853 – 8 February 1929) was a British soldier and Scottish Unionist Party politician. He served in the Second Anglo-Afghan War, the Second Boer War and World War I. During his political career, he represented the constituencies of East Fife and North Lanarkshire.

== Early life ==
The only son of Alexander Sprot (1823-1854) of Garnkirk, Lanarkshire, of a family formerly of Edinburgh that owned a brick-making works, and Rachael Jane (daughter of Peter Cleghorn, of Stravithie), he was educated at Harrow School and at Trinity College, Cambridge.

== Military career ==
Sprot was commissioned into the Royal Lanarkshire Militia, where he reached the rank of Lieutenant. In 1874 he was commissioned Sub-Lieutenant in the 6th Dragoon Guards. He was promoted Lieutenant in 1876, Captain in 1882, Major in 1889, Lieutenant-Colonel in 1900, and Colonel in 1904. He served in the Second Anglo-Afghan War 1879–1880 (awarded the Afghanistan Medal). He later served in the Second Boer War (for which he was awarded the Queen's South Africa Medal with 6 clasps, the King's South Africa Medal with 2 clasps, and was mentioned in despatches twice, including 31 March 1900). He left South Africa in April 1902 on board the SS Walmer Castle, arriving at Southampton early the following month. He retired in 1909, but later served in World War I as an Administrative Commandant from 1915 (being mentioned in despatches twice and awarded the Mons Star, Croix de Guerre, British War Medal and Victory Medal). He was appointed Companion of the Order of St Michael and St George (CMG) in the 1917 New Year Honours.

== Political career ==
He unsuccessfully contested Montrose Burghs in 1906. In the two elections in 1910, he stood in East Fife against the Prime Minister H. H. Asquith. In 1918, Asquith was not opposed by a Coalition candidate, but the local Conservative Association decided to field a candidate against him. Sprot, despite being refused the "Coupon" – the official endorsement given by David Lloyd George and Bonar Law to Coalition candidates – defeated Asquith. Sprot sat for that constituency until he was defeated in 1922, and again in 1923. He then sat for North Lanarkshire from 1924 until his death in 1929.

== Personal life ==
In 1879, he married Ethel Florence Thorp, daughter of Deputy Surgeon-General Edward C. Thorp, MD. They had nine daughters, of which two died in infancy. Of the other seven all married military or naval men save Alix, who took holy orders in Palestine.

- Rachel Sprot (1880-1882)
- Ethel (Mice) Grace Sprot (1881-1967) married 1904, Colonel Hereward Sadler OBE DL JP.
- Mabel Elizabeth Sprot (1883-1983), MBE, who married in 1904 Sir George Stirling, 9th Baronet
- Alix Isabella Sprot (1884-1972), who became an Abbess in the Russian Orthodox Church Outside Russia at Bethany in Palestine.
- Constance Sprot (1886-1886)
- Sarah Douglas Sprot (1887-1975) married 1913, Major William Edgar Mann (1885-1969), D.S.O., of the Royal Field Artillery, son of Sir Edward Mann, 1st Baronet. Their son, Major Edward Charles Mann (1918-1959), D.S.O., M.C., 12th Royal Lancers, of The Mill House, Dunsfold, Surrey, was father of Sir Rupert Edward Mann, 3rd Baronet.
- Rachel Septima Sprot (1890-1983) married 1920, Lieutenant Colonel John Reginald Noble Graham VC OBE.
- Harriet Hill Sprot (1893-1976) married 1920, General Sir Thomas Sheridan Riddell-Webster GCB DSO.
- Nancy Margaret Sprot (1895-1994) married 1935, Captain Chicele Keppel Bampton RN.

Sir Alexander was also Master of the Fox Hounds with the Fife Hounds. He was created a baronet in 1918.

Parliament of the United Kingdom
Preceded by H. H. Asquith	Member of Parliament for East Fife; 1918–1922	Succeeded by James Duncan Millar
Preceded by Joseph Sullivan	Member of Parliament for North Lanarkshire; 1924–1929	Succeeded by Jennie Lee
Baronetage of the United Kingdom
New creation	Baronet (of Garnkirk, Lanarkshire); 1918–1929	Extinct
