= Stan Awbery =

British trade unionist and politician

Member of Parliament for Bristol Central
- In office 26 July 1945 – 15 October 1964
- Preceded by: Violet Bathurst
- Succeeded by: Arthur Palmer

Personal details
- Born: 19 July 1888 Swansea, Wales
- Died: 7 May 1969 (aged 80)
- Party: Labour

Stanley Stephen Awbery (19 July 1888 – 7 May 1969) was a British trade unionist and Labour Party politician who served as the Member of Parliament (MP) for Bristol Central from 1945 to 1964. Awbery's election necessitated the passing of an Act of Parliament to validate his election, as he held office as an assessor under section 6 of the National Service (Armed Forces) Act, 1939 and was therefore incapable of being elected.

Awbery was born in Swansea, and began work at a copperworks aged 13. In 1904 he began his trade union activities when he joined the Dock, Wharf, Riverside and General Labourers' Union. He became the secretary of the Fuel Workers' Branch in 1913, and national auditor of the union in 1919. He became a permanent official with the union in 1920 and in 1926 district secretary at Barry Docks.

He was a member of the Welsh Committee of the Independent Labour Party, becoming chairman in 1929. He was elected to Barry Town Council and was mayor of Barry in 1941. He stood unsuccessfully as Labour Party candidate for the Clitheroe constituency at the 1931 and 1935 general elections. He was selected to contest Bristol Central in 1937, although the anticipated general election was postponed due to the Second World War. He finally entered parliament at the 1945 general election and remained Member of Parliament for Bristol Central until his retirement in 1964.

On the 7 May 1952 Awbery played a minor role in the British Malayan headhunting scandal. In the House of Commons, Awbery asked Oliver Lyttelton for information on photographs published by the Daily Worker (now Morning Star) depicting British soldiers during the Malayan Emergency posing with decapitated human heads. Lyttelton responded to Awbery by confirming that the photographs were indeed genuine, and that previous government denials of their authenticity were wrong.

Awbrey was a keen local historian, and published a number of books on the subject.

Parliament of the United Kingdom
Preceded by Lady Apsley	Member of Parliament for Bristol Central; 1945 – 1964	Succeeded by Arthur Palmer
