= Beth Morgan =

Beth Morgan may refer to:

- Beth Morgan (basketball) (born 1975), American basketball player
- Beth Morgan (cricketer) (born 1981), English cricketer
- Beth Morgan (Hollyoaks), a character in UK soap opera Hollyoaks

== See also ==
- Elizabeth Morgan (disambiguation)
