= Minna Cowan =

Cowan, Minna Galbraith (1878–1951), social worker and educational administrator

Minna Galbraith Cowan OBE
- Born: 1 May 1878; Paisley, Scotland, UK
- Died: 8 July 1951 (aged 73); Edinburgh, Scotland
- Education: Girton College, Cambridge (1897–1900); University of Edinburgh
- Occupations: committee member, author
- Known for: political activism
- Honours: OBE

Minna Galbraith Cowan OBE (1 May 1878 – 8 July 1951) was a British political activist.

== Biography ==
Cowan was born on 1 May 1878 in Paisley, Renfrewshire to Williamina Galbraith and Hugh Cowan, a sheriff. She was educated in Hendon and Glasgow, going on to study at Girton College, Cambridge, before completing a social science diploma at the University of Edinburgh. She sat on numerous committees, and in 1914 visited India to study the conditions of women there, writing The Education of the Women of India to relay her conclusions.

During World War I, Cowan served in the Women's Royal Naval Service, while also sitting on Edinburgh School Board. In 1919, she became the first convener of the city's new education authority, in which role she introduced limited free school meals and play centres to occupy children out of school hours, and reduced the maximum class sizes to fifty pupils. Four years later, she moved to the city's higher education committee, with responsibility for secondary schools, and in 1930 to its overarching education committee.

In the 1928 birthday honours list she was appointed an Officer of the Order of the British Empire (OBE) (civil division) for her political and public services in Edinburgh. Cowan was also active in the Unionist Party, standing unsuccessfully in Paisley at the 1929 United Kingdom general election, and again unsuccessfully for Edinburgh East in 1935.

In World War II, Cowan worked for the Ministry of Food, where she took the lead in establishing British restaurants in eastern Scotland. After the war, she served on the National Council of Women of Great Britain, and was its president in 1946/7, in which role she tried to build links with the German women's movement, and also campaigned for better treatment of Greek refugees.
