= Frances Kerby =

Frances Kerby (1907 or 1908 – April 1970) was a British political activist.

Born Frances Edwards, she worked as a teacher in Salford and became active in the Labour Party, standing unsuccessfully in Flintshire at the 1931 UK general election. After the election, she married the Canon Edwin Kerby, and she stood unsuccessfully under her married name in Darwen at the 1935 UK general election. She also won election to Swinton and Pendlebury council.

In December 1939, a by-election was held in Stretford. Due to World War II, the main parties had agreed an electoral truce, although Kerby opposed this. The Constituency Labour Party, wishing to maintain its profile while unable to contest the by-election, announced her as its Prospective Parliamentary Candidate for the next general election. However, no election was held until 1945, and she never stood in the seat. Instead, in 1944, she became the party's Regional Women's Organiser for the North West.

Kerby retired in 1968, living in Newton-le-Willows, becoming a part-time lecturer, and in 1969 she was appointed to the Warrington New Town Development Corporation. She died in 1970.
