= Ruby Part =

British trade unionist and political activist

Ruby Docie Quarrell Part (1894 – 1969) was a British trade unionist and political activist.

Born in Swindon, Part trained as a milliner and moved to Bristol. Shocked by working conditions, in 1913 she joined the Workers' Union, and soon began working full-time as a union organiser, in Somerset, opening a chain of branches for women glovemakers. She later became the union's national women's organiser. She also joined the Independent Labour Party and the No More War Movement.

In 1928, Part married John Davies, a prominent figure in the Workers' Educational Association, and she became Ruby Davies. She stood for the Labour Party in Wells at the 1929 UK general election, taking third place, with 15% of the vote.
