= Joseph Sullivan (British politician) =

British politician

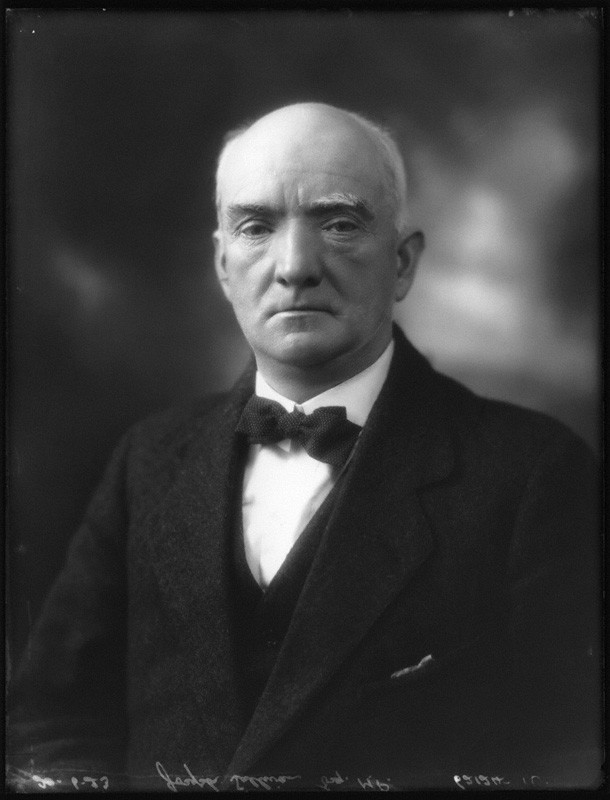
- Sullivan in 1923

Member of Parliament for North Lanarkshire
- In office 1922–1924
- Preceded by: Robert McLaren
- Succeeded by: Alexander Sprot

Member of Parliament for Bothwell
- In office 26 March 1926 – 27 October 1931
- Preceded by: John Robertson
- Succeeded by: Helen Shaw

Personal details
- Born: 8 September 1866 Cambuslang, Lanarkshire, Scotland
- Died: 13 February 1935 (aged 68) Mossend, Lanarkshire, Scotland
- Party: Labour
- Spouse: Ann Jane Winters (m. 1888; died 1923) Annie Murphy (m. 1929)
- Children: 8
- Parent(s): Bernard Sullivan; Mary (née Carroll)

Joseph Sullivan (8 September 1866 – 13 February 1935) was a Scottish Labour Party politician who served as a Member of Parliament (MP) from 1922 to 1924, and from 1926 to 1931.

== Life ==
Born in Cambuslang to Irish immigrants Bernard and Mary (née Carroll), Sullivan was educated in Bellshill and Newton, before becoming a coal miner. He became active in the Lanarkshire Miners' County Union, serving as its president, and as a full-time agent for the union.

At the 1906 United Kingdom general election, Sullivan stood for the Scottish Workers' Representation Committee in North West Lanarkshire, but was not elected. In 1909, the committee became part of the Labour Party, for which Sullivan stood in North East Lanarkshire at the January 1910 United Kingdom general election, but he was again unsuccessful.

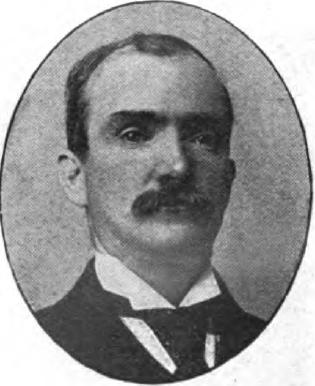

At the 1918 general election, he unsuccessfully contested the North Lanarkshire constituency, but won the seat at the 1922 general election. He was re-elected in 1923, but was defeated at the 1924 general election by the Conservative Party candidate Sir Alexander Sprot.

In 1926 he was returned to the House of Commons as MP for Bothwell, at a by-election following the death of the Labour MP John Robertson. He was re-elected in 1929, but lost the seat at the 1931 general election when the Labour vote collapsed as the party split over its leader Ramsay MacDonald's formation of a National Government.

He died at his home in Mossend, North Lanarkshire on 13 February 1935 aged 68.

== Sources ==
- Craig, F. W. S. (1983) [1969]. British parliamentary election results 1918-1949 (3rd ed.). Chichester: Parliamentary Research Services. ISBN 0-900178-06-X.
- Leigh Rayment's Historical List of MPs

Parliament of the United Kingdom
Preceded by Robert McLaren	Member of Parliament for North Lanarkshire; 1922–1924	Succeeded by Sir Alexander Sprot
Preceded by John Robertson	Member of Parliament for Bothwell; 1926–1931	Succeeded by Helen Shaw
