= Barbara Bliss =

British writer, lecturer and politician (1897–1987)

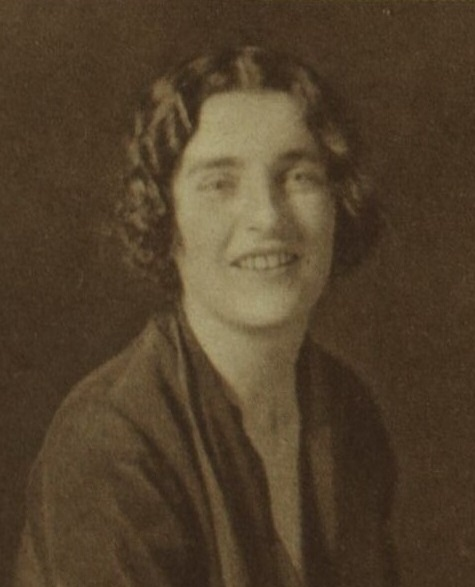
Barbara Bliss

Barbara Ellen Mary Stevenson Bliss (12 April 1897 – 1987), was a British writer, lecturer and Liberal Party politician.

== Background ==
Bliss was born at The Tarlah, Boudjah near Smyrna, Ottoman Empire, the youngest of three daughters to Joseph Bliss and Margaret McClymont. Her father was briefly Liberal MP for Cockermouth. She grew up in Söke, Ottoman Empire. She was educated privately and at Girton College, Cambridge from 1917 to 1920, where she studied History and Economics.

== Professional career ==
Bliss was engaged in Voluntary Aid Detachment work during World War One. She returned to Turkey and was involved in refugee work in Constantinople. She undertook a lecture tour of Canada for the Save the Children Fund. She was a member of the Armenian Committee of the Save the Children Fund. In 1926 she went on a world tour with her father. She was the Organising Secretary of the Housing Improvement Society in London. As a writer, her published works included 'The Temperance Question: its Relation to Women's Problems of To-Day.'

== Political career ==
Given that her father had been an active Liberal, it was not surprising that Bliss should take up politics. While at University, she was a leading member of the Cambridge University Liberal Club In 1922 she became active in the Women's Liberal Federation, when she was first elected to the Federation's national executive. At the 1924 general election, she spoke in support of Ronald Williams, a Liberal MP defending his seat of Sevenoaks. In 1925 she first stood for election as a Progressive candidate for St Margaret's ward in the Westminster City Council elections. She became an Honorary Secretary of the anti-Lloyd George group, the 'Liberal Council'. She carried out this role from 1927 to 1934.

At the age of 32, Bliss was Liberal candidate for the East Grinstead division of Sussex at the 1929 general election. She was adopted as candidate in January 1928. This was the "Flapper Election" where women under the age of 30 were allowed to vote for the first time. East Grinstead was a safe Unionist seat and not promising territory for a Liberal candidate. However, she achieved a swing to the Liberals of 6.3%, finishing a respectable second place ahead of the Labour candidate.

She was Liberal candidate for the Carlisle division of Cumberland at the 1935 general election. She had some link with the area as the Bliss family had lived in Cumberland. However, a Liberal had not won Carlisle since 1918 and no Liberal had fought the seat at the previous election in 1931. This was not a good omen and she came a poor third.

Twenty-nine years later, she stood for a final time as a parliamentary candidate. She was Liberal candidate for the Isle of Wight division of Hampshire at the 1964 general election. No Liberal had run here since 1945, when they finished a poor third. It was regarded as a safe Conservative seat. She came third polling nearly 15%. She did not stand for parliament again.

=== Electoral record ===
General Election 1929: East Grinstead
Party	Candidate	Votes	%	±%
Unionist	Henry Cautley	21,940	57.9	−6.7
Liberal	Barbara Bliss	9,718	25.6	+5.9
Labour	Thomas Crawford	6,265	16.5	+0.8
Majority		12,222	32.3	−12.6
Turnout			68.5	−1.7
Unionist hold		Swing	-6.3	

General Election 1935: Carlisle
Party	Candidate	Votes	%	±%
Conservative	Edward Spears	16,591	48.7	−8.6
Labour	Arnold Townend	13,956	41.0	+1.6
Liberal	Barbara Bliss	3,525	10.3	n/a
Majority		2,635	7.7	−7.0
Turnout			88.2	+1.5
Conservative hold		Swing	-3.5	

General Election 1964: Isle of Wight
Party	Candidate	Votes	%	±%
Conservative	Mark Woodnutt	27,497	53.5	−9.4
Labour	William Mann	16,244	31.6	−5.5
Liberal	Barbara Bliss	7,666	14.9	n/a
Majority		11,253	21.9	−3.9
Turnout			74.3	+0.2
Conservative hold		Swing	-1.9	
