= Sarah Ward (politician) =

British Conservative politician

Sarah Ward CBE

Member of Parliament for Cannock
- In office 27 October 1931 – 25 October 1935
- Preceded by: William Adamson
- Succeeded by: William Adamson

Personal details
- Born: Sarah Adelaide Ainsworth; 25 December 1895 Meaford Farm, Stone, Staffordshire, England
- Died: 9 April 1969 (aged 73)
- Party: Conservative
- Spouse: William J. Ward
- Children: 1

Sarah Adelaide Ward CBE (25 December 1895 – 9 April 1969) was a Conservative Party politician in the United Kingdom.

== Early life ==
Ward was born Sarah Adelaide Ainsworth on Meaford Farm in Stone, Staffordshire on 25 December 1895. She attended Orme Girls' School in Newcastle before spending several years teaching at Christ Church School in Stone. During the First World War, she was a nurse in the Voluntary Aid Detachment in the 90th Staffordshire VADs. She married William J. Ward, a local tenant farmer, in 1921 and they had a daughter, Margaret. They moved to Grange Farm in Walsall Wood.

== Political career ==
In the 1931 Conservative landslide, Ward was elected as the Member of Parliament (MP) for the Cannock constituency in Staffordshire, ousting the Labour incumbent, William Adamson with a majority of 4,665 votes. During her time as a member of parliament, Ward focused on rural issues including death duties on estates, effects of cheaper food imports and the lack of investment and she supported levying of emergency duties on luxury foods. She tried to introduce the Home and Empire Settlement Bill to encourage people to work on agricultural land however while she had the support of Conservative MPs who wanted more investment in agriculture, she did not have enough government support. She was supportive of the extension of unemployment insurance and the better treatment of agricultural labourers as she believed that the wives of the unemployed often had to deal with the "biggest brunt" of the effects of unemployment. Ward held the seat until 1935, when it was regained by Adamson with a majority of 1,046 votes. During the Second World War she served in the Auxiliary Territorial Service as a junior commander. She unsuccessfully stood for election in Lichfield and Tamworth at the 1950 general election and for Birmingham Perry Barr in the 1951 general election. She was also a member of the Staffordshire County Council between 1950 and 1969 and was the chair of the council's services committee.

== Later life ==
She was appointed as OBE in the 1952 Birthday Honours and CBE in the 1961 Birthday Honours.

Ward died on 9 April 1969.

Parliament of the United Kingdom
Preceded by William Adamson	Member of Parliament for Cannock; 1931 – 1935	Succeeded by William Adamson
