= Constance Borrett =

British political activist

Constance Elizabeth Maude Borrett (1890 – c.1954) was a British political activist.

Born in Windsor, Borrett was educated in Acton, and then at St Catharine's College in Tottenham. She became a school teacher, and joined the Independent Labour Party (ILP), becoming vice-chair of its Harrow branch in 1924. She then moved to Pontypridd, where she became secretary of the ILP's Pontypridd and District Federation, also serving on the party's Welsh Divisional Council.

The ILP was affiliated to the Labour Party, and at the 1929 UK general election, Borrett stood for it in Weston-super-Mare, taking third place, with 11.1% of the vote. The ILP disaffiliated from the Labour Party in 1931, but Borrett disagreed with the decision, and at the 1931 UK general election, she again stood for Labour, this time in Tonbridge, where she took second place, with 21.2% of the vote.

Borrett joined the Socialist League, an ILP split which affiliated to the Labour Party. From 1933, she served on the Socialist League's national executive. At the 1935 UK general election, she stood in Stroud, taking 36.8% of the vote.
