= Catherine Gavin =

Scottish historian and novelist (1907–1999)

Catherine Gavin DLitt
- Catherine Gavin, from a 1969 newspaper.
- Born: 13 May 1907; Aberdeen, Scotland
- Died: 27 December 1999 (age 92)
- Occupations: historian, academic, war correspondent, novelist

Academic background
- Education: University of Aberdeen

Catherine Irvine Gavin (13 May 1907 – 27 December 1999) was a Scottish academic historian, war correspondent, and historical novelist.

== Early life ==
Gavin was born in Aberdeen in 1907, and studied history and English at the University of Aberdeen, graduating with first-class honours. She completed doctoral work in 1931, with a doctoral thesis on Louis Philippe of France; her thesis was published in 1933.

== Career ==
Gavin held positions as a history lecturer at Aberdeen and at the University of Glasgow. She stood unsuccessfully as a Unionist candidate in two parliamentary elections in the 1930s.

During World War II, she worked in France and the Netherlands for Kemsley Newspapers. She also wrote a biography of Edward VII, published in 1941. She was a correspondent in the Middle East and Ethiopia after the war, for the Daily Express. After marriage, she worked a few years on the staff of Time magazine in New York. She wrote about her wartime experiences in Liberated France (1955).

Most of Gavin's literary output was in the genre of historical romance. "Her characters are attractive flesh-and-blood people, her narrative adventurous and suspenseful, and her use of history skillful and unerring," reported one American reviewer in 1957. The University of Aberdeen awarded her an honorary DLitt in 1986. The Catherine Gavin Room there is named in her honour. The university has a 1940 portrait of her, in oil, by Elizabeth Mary Watt.

Gavin appeared as a castaway on the BBC Radio programme Desert Island Discs on 24 June 1978.

== Selected works ==
Gavin's works of historical fiction include the following titles:

- Clyde Valley (1938)
- The Hostile Shore (1940)
- The Black Milestone (1941)
- The Mountain of Light (1944)
- Madeleine (1957)
- The Cactus and the Crown (1962)
- The Fortress (1964)
- The Moon into Blood (1966)
- The Devil in Harbour (1968)
- The House of War (1970)
- Give Me the Daggers (1972)
- The Snow Mountain (1973)
- Traitors' Gate (1976)
- None Dare Call It Treason (1978)
- How Sleep the Brave (1980)
- The Sunset Dream (1984)
- A Light Woman (1986)
- A Dawn of Splendour (1989)
- The French Fortune (1991)
- One Candle Burning (1996)

== Personal life ==
In 1948, Gavin married American advertising executive John Ashcraft and moved to the United States with him. She was widowed in 1998, and died in 1999, aged 92.
