= 1926 Bothwell by-election =

UK parliamentary by-election

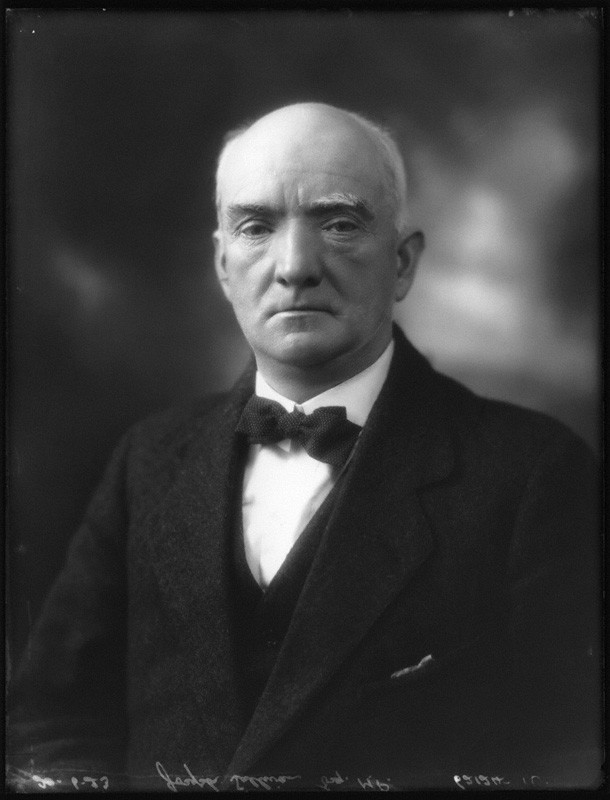
Joseph Sullivan

The 1926 Bothwell by-election was held on 26 March 1926. The by-election was held due to the death of the incumbent Labour MP, John Robertson. It was won by the Labour candidate Joseph Sullivan.

== Result ==
Bothwell by-election, 1926
Party	Candidate	Votes	%	±%
Labour	Joseph Sullivan	14,830	59.7	+3.4
Unionist	Alexander Morrice Mackay	8,740	35.2	−8.5
Liberal	Ernest Young	1,276	5.1	New
Majority		6,090	24.5	+11.9
Turnout		24,846	74.2	−5.1
Registered electors		33,505		
Labour hold		Swing	+6.0	
