= Bristol Central =

UK Parliament constituency (1918–1974, 2024 onwards)

- Borough constituency for the House of Commons
- Boundary of Bristol Central in South West England
- County: City of Bristol
- Electorate: 70,227 (2023)
- Major settlements: Bristol

Current constituency
- Created: 2024
- Member of Parliament: Carla Denyer (Green)
- Seats: 1
- Created from: Bristol West

1918–1974
- Seats: one
- Created from: Bristol East; Bristol North; Bristol South; Bristol West
- Replaced by: Bristol North East; Bristol South East

Bristol Central is a parliamentary constituency located within the City of Bristol in South West England. It returns one Member of Parliament (MP) to the House of Commons of the Parliament of the United Kingdom. Since 2024, it has been represented by Carla Denyer, former co-leader of the Green Party.

A constituency of this name existed from 1918 to 1974. The modern constituency was re-established in 2024 as a successor to Bristol West.

== Constituency profile ==
The Bristol Central constituency is located within Bristol, a city in South West England. It is entirely urban and contains the city centre along with neighbourhoods to its north and west, including St Werburghs, Bishopston and Clifton. Bristol is a major port city and has a long history of trade, including the slave trade. The constituency contains the University of Bristol and thus has a large student population.

Compared to national averages, residents of Bristol Central are considerably younger and have very high levels of education and professional employment. They are largely unmarried, irreligious and have low levels of deprivation. Clifton is highly affluent and is one of the 10% least-deprived areas in England. The constituency is slightly more ethnically diverse than the rest of the country; 78% of residents are White, 8% are Asian and 6% are Black. Bristol Central has also been reported to be the most pro-immigration constituency in the United Kingdom; 55% of voters wanted fewer controls and higher levels of immigration in the city according to a survey published by The Telegraph.

At the city council, all wards in the Bristol Central constituency are represented by Green Party councillors. Voters in the constituency overwhelmingly supported remaining in the European Union in the 2016 referendum. An estimated 88% voted against Brexit, the highest rate of any constituency in the United Kingdom.

== History ==
Bristol Central was first created for the 1918 general election, and abolished for the February 1974 general election, after which it was absorbed into Bristol North East and Bristol South East.

During the Fifth Periodic Review of Westminster constituencies in 2000-07, a proposal to rename Bristol West to "Bristol Central" was rejected.

=== Modern constituency ===
Following the 2023 Periodic Review of Westminster constituencies, Bristol Central largely replaced Bristol West, comprising approximately 70% of the abolished constituency. It was first contested at the 2024 general election.

=== 2024 election ===
In January 2022, Bristol West MP Thangam Debbonaire was reselected by the Labour Party to stand as their candidate for Bristol Central in the next general election; on 4 September 2023 she was appointed Shadow Secretary of State for Culture, Media and Sport by Keir Starmer. London's mayor, Sadiq Khan, visited Clifton to show support for Debbonaire, claiming that Bristol would "have a strong champion as culture secretary in the next Labour government".

In 2023, the Green Party said that Bristol Central would be a target seat for the party, and selected their co-leader, Carla Denyer, as their candidate. Following the May local elections, the Green Party became the biggest party in Bristol City Council. Denyer aimed to capitalise upon voters "feeling utterly uninspired by the potential of a Keir Starmer-led Labour party". Former MP for Liverpool Riverside, Dame Louise Ellman accused the Green Party of stirring up divisions over the Gaza war as part of their electoral campaign, by including the Palestinian flag and images of destruction in Gaza on their distribution letters in Bristol.

Other running candidates included, Reform UK's Robert Clarke, the Liberal Democrats's Nicholas Coombes, and the Conservatives' Samuel Williams.

At the beginning of the campaign, The Economist and the Financial Times predicted Labour would win in Bristol Central, based upon poll tracking. Constituent Carol Vorderman predicted the Green Party would win the election with 52% of the vote share.

== Boundaries ==
=== Historic ===
1918–1950: The County Borough of Bristol wards of Central East, Central West, Redcliffe, St Augustine, St James, St Paul, and St Philip and Jacob South.

1950–1955: The County Borough of Bristol wards of Easton, Knowle, Redcliffe, St Paul, St Philip and Jacob North, and St Philip and Jacob South.

1955–1974: The County Borough of Bristol wards of Easton, Knowle, St Paul, St Philip and Jacob, and Windmill Hill.

=== Current ===
Map of boundaries from 2024

2024–present: The City of Bristol wards of Ashley, Central, Clifton, Clifton Down, Cotham, Hotwells and Harbourside, and Redland.

The seat comprises the former Bristol West constituency – minus the wards of Bishopston and Ashley Down, which was moved to Bristol North West, and Lawrence Hill and Easton, which were moved to Bristol East.

== Members of Parliament ==
Election	Member	Party	Notes
1918	Thomas Inskip	Conservative	
1929	Joseph Alpass	Labour	
1931	Lord Apsley	Conservative	Killed in action, 1942 as Commander of the Arab Legion in Malta
1943 by-election	Lady Apsley	Conservative	
1945	Stan Awbery	Labour	
1964	Arthur Palmer	Labour	
1974–2024	None		Constituency not in use 1974–2024.
2024	Carla Denyer	Green	Co-leader of the Green Party (until 2 September 2025)

== Election results ==
=== Elections in the 2020s ===
General election 2024: Bristol Central
Party	Candidate	Votes	%	±%
Green	Carla Denyer	24,539	56.6	+30.6
Labour	Thangam Debbonaire	14,132	32.6	−25.9
Conservative	Samuel Williams	1,998	4.6	−9.7
Reform	Robert Clarke	1,338	3.1	+1.9
Liberal Democrats	Nicholas Coombes	1,162	2.7	New
Party of Women	Kellie-Jay Keen	196	0.5	New
Majority		10,407	24.0	N/A
Turnout		43,365	69.1	–4.1
Registered electors		62,735		
Green gain from Labour		Swing	+28.2	

=== Elections in the 2010s ===
2019 notional result
Party	Vote	%
Labour	30,077	58.5
Green	13,381	26.0
Conservative	7,376	14.3
Brexit Party	593	1.2
Turnout	51,427	73.2
Electorate	70,227	

=== Elections in the 1970s ===
General election 1970: Bristol Central
Party	Candidate	Votes	%	±%
Labour	Arthur Palmer	12,375	51.4	−7.5
Conservative	James R. E. Taylor	9,130	37.9	+1.9
Liberal	Antony Rider	2,569	10.7	New
Majority		3,245	13.5	−9.4
Turnout		24,074	66.7	−3.3
Labour hold		Swing		

=== Elections in the 1960s ===
General election 1966: Bristol Central
Party	Candidate	Votes	%	±%
Labour	Arthur Palmer	15,399	58.9	+3.4
Conservative	James R. E. Taylor	9,410	36.0	−3.0
Independent	Desmond H. R. Burgess	1,322	5.1	−1.4
Majority		5,989	22.9	+7.4
Turnout		26,131	70.0	−1.9
Labour hold		Swing		

General election 1964: Bristol Central
Party	Candidate	Votes	%	±%
Labour	Arthur Palmer	16,207	54.5	+0.9
Conservative	James R. E. Taylor	11,616	39.0	−7.4
Independent	Desmond H. R. Burgess	1,936	6.5	New
Majority		4,591	15.5	+8.3
Turnout		29,759	71.9	−3.1
Labour hold		Swing		

=== Elections in the 1950s ===
General election 1959: Bristol Central
Party	Candidate	Votes	%	±%
Labour	Stan Awbery	19,905	53.6	−6.9
Conservative	L. G. Pine	17,209	46.4	+6.9
Majority		2,696	7.2	−13.8
Turnout		37,114	75.0	+1.2
Labour hold		Swing		

General election 1955: Bristol Central
Party	Candidate	Votes	%	±%
Labour	Stan Awbery	25,158	60.5	−1.9
Conservative	Kenelm Antony Philip Dalby	16,406	39.5	+1.9
Majority		8,752	21.0	−3.8
Turnout		41,564	73.8	−9.3
Labour hold		Swing		

General election 1951: Bristol Central
Party	Candidate	Votes	%	±%
Labour	Stan Awbery	26,091	62.4	+2.7
Conservative	Kenelm Antony Philip Dalby	15,725	37.6	+6.6
Majority		10,366	24.8	−3.9
Turnout		41,816	83.1	−1.4
Labour hold		Swing		

General election 1950: Bristol Central
Party	Candidate	Votes	%	±%
Labour	Stan Awbery	25,889	59.7	−4.2
Conservative	John Peyton	13,461	31.0	−5.1
Liberal	Donald David Oliver Jones	4,042	9.3	New
Majority		12,428	28.7	+0.9
Turnout		43,392	84.5	+14.5
Labour hold		Swing		

=== Elections in the 1940s ===
General election 1945: Bristol Central
Party	Candidate	Votes	%	±%
Labour	Stan Awbery	13,045	63.9	+16.4
Conservative	Violet Bathurst	7,369	36.1	−16.4
Majority		5,676	27.8	N/A
Turnout		20,414	70.0	−2.8
Labour gain from Conservative		Swing		

Awbery's election necessitated the passing of an Act of Parliament to validate his election, as he held office as an assessor under section 6 of the National Service (Armed Forces) Act, 1939 and was therefore incapable of being elected.

1943 Bristol Central by-election
Party	Candidate	Votes	%	±%
Conservative	Violet Bathurst	5,867	52.1	−0.4
Independent Labour	Jennie Lee	4,308	38.2	New
Ind. Labour Party	John McNair	830	7.4	New
Independent	F. H. Dunn	258	2.3	New
Majority		1,559	13.9	+8.9
Turnout		11,263	32.9	−39.9
Conservative hold		Swing		

=== Elections in the 1930s ===
General election 1935: Bristol Central
Party	Candidate	Votes	%	±%
Conservative	Allen Bathurst	15,774	52.5	−7.1
Labour	J. J. Taylor	14,258	47.5	+7.1
Majority		1,516	5.0	−14.2
Turnout		30,032	72.8	−7.6
Conservative hold		Swing		

General election 1931: Bristol Central
Party	Candidate	Votes	%	±%
Conservative	Allen Bathurst	22,311	59.6	+15.3
Labour	Joseph Alpass	15,143	40.4	−15.3
Majority		7,168	19.2	N/A
Turnout		37,454	80.4	+2.9
Conservative gain from Labour		Swing		

=== Elections in the 1920s ===
General election 1929: Bristol Central
Party	Candidate	Votes	%	±%
Labour	Joseph Alpass	20,749	55.7	+10.8
Unionist	Thomas Inskip	16,524	44.3	−10.8
Majority		4,225	11.4	N/A
Turnout		37,273	77.5	0.0
Registered electors		48,081		
Labour gain from Unionist		Swing	+10.8	

General election 1924: Bristol Central
Party	Candidate	Votes	%	±%
Unionist	Thomas Inskip	17,177	55.1	+0.4
Labour	James Lovat-Fraser	14,018	44.9	−0.4
Majority		3,159	10.2	+0.8
Turnout		31,195	77.5	+11.7
Registered electors		40,252		
Unionist hold		Swing	+0.4	

General election 1923: Bristol Central
Party	Candidate	Votes	%	±%
Unionist	Thomas Inskip	14,386	54.7	−1.2
Labour	Samuel Edward Walters	11,932	45.3	+1.2
Majority		2,454	9.4	−2.4
Turnout		26,318	65.8	−6.2
Registered electors		40,000		
Unionist hold		Swing	−1.2	

General election 1922: Bristol Central
Party	Candidate	Votes	%	±%
Unionist	Thomas Inskip	15,568	55.9	−6.3
Labour	Christopher Thomson	12,303	44.1	+6.3
Majority		3,265	11.8	−12.6
Turnout		27,871	72.0	+18.3
Registered electors		38,709		
Unionist hold		Swing	−6.3	

=== Elections in the 1910s ===
General election 1918: Bristol Central
Party		Candidate	Votes	%
C	Unionist	Thomas Inskip	12,232	63.2
	Labour	Ernest Bevin	7,137	36.8
Majority			5,095	26.4
Turnout			19,369	53.7
Registered electors			36,038	
	Unionist win (new seat)			
C indicates candidate endorsed by the coalition government.

== See also ==
- 1943 Bristol Central by-election
- Politics of Bristol

== Sources ==
- Craig, Fred W. S. (1983) [1969]. British parliamentary election results 1918-1949 (3rd ed.). Chichester: Parliamentary Research Services. ISBN 0-900178-06-X.
