= North Lanarkshire (UK Parliament constituency) =

Parliamentary constituency in the United Kingdom, 1918–1983

- Former county constituency for the House of Commons

1918–1983
- Seats: One
- Created from: North East Lanarkshire and North West Lanarkshire
- Replaced by: Motherwell North, Monklands West, Monklands East and Strathkelvin & Bearsden

1868–1885
- Seats: One
- Type of constituency: County constituency
- Created from: Lanarkshire
- Replaced by: Govan; Mid Lanarkshire; North East Lanarkshire; North West Lanarkshire; Partick

North (or Northern) Lanarkshire was a county constituency of the House of Commons of the Parliament of the United Kingdom (Westminster) from 1868 to 1885 and from 1918 to 1983. It elected one Member of Parliament (MP) by the first-past-the-post voting system.

== Boundaries ==
=== 1868 to 1885 ===
The Representation of the People (Scotland) Act 1868 provided that the North Lanarkshire constituency was to consist of the parishes of Avondale, Barony, Blantyre, Bothwell, Cadder, Cambuslang, Carmunnock, City Parish of Glasgow, Dalziel, East Kilbride, Glassford, Hamilton, New Monkland, Old Monkland, Rutherglen and so much of the parishes of Govan and of Cathcart as is situated in Lanarkshire.

=== 1918 to 1983 ===
From 1918 the Northern Lanarkshire constituency consisted of "The parts of the Lower Ward and Middle Ward County Districts which are contained within the parishes of Glasgow, Cadder, New Monkland, Shotts, and Cambusnethan, exclusive of any burghs or portions of burghs situated therein."

The Seat was notably represented by Jennie Lee during her first term as an MP. Upon her election she became the youngest woman member of the House of Commons and at the time of the by-election she herself was too young to vote.

Prior to the abolition of the seat it was represented by John Smith, future leader of the Labour Party and the opposition.

== Members of Parliament ==
=== MPs 1868–1885 ===
Election	Member	Party
1868	Sir Edward Colebrooke	
1885	constituency abolished	

=== MPs 1918–1983 ===
Election	Member	Party
1918	Robert McLaren	Unionist
1922	Joseph Sullivan	Labour
1924	Sir Alexander Sprot	Unionist
1929 by-election	Jennie Lee	Labour
1931	William Anstruther-Gray	Unionist
1945	Margaret Herbison	Labour
1970	John Smith	Labour
1983	constituency abolished: see Monklands East	

== Election results ==
=== Elections 1868–1885 ===
General election 1868: North Lanarkshire
Party	Candidate	Votes	%	±%
Liberal	Edward Colebrooke	Unopposed		
Registered electors		5,458		
Liberal win (new seat)				

General election 1874: North Lanarkshire
Party	Candidate	Votes	%	±%
Liberal	Edward Colebrooke	Unopposed		
Registered electors		7,217		
Liberal hold				

General election 1880: North Lanarkshire
Party	Candidate	Votes	%	±%
Liberal	Edward Colebrooke	Unopposed		
Registered electors		10,324		
Liberal hold				

=== Elections in the 1910s ===
General election 1918: North Lanarkshire
Party		Candidate	Votes	%	±%
C	Unionist	Robert McLaren	7,175	43.1	
	Labour	Joseph Sullivan	5,673	34.1	
	Liberal	Alexander Erskine-Hill	3,068	18.5	
	Independent	J.R. Auld	710	4.3	
Majority			1,502	9.0	
Turnout			16,626	41.6	
Registered electors			40,014		
	Unionist win (new seat)				
C indicates candidate endorsed by the coalition government.

=== Elections in the 1920s ===
General election 1922: North Lanarkshire
Party	Candidate	Votes	%	±%
Labour	Joseph Sullivan	10,349	47.3	+13.2
Unionist	Robert McLaren	7,957	36.4	−6.7
Liberal	John Connolly Carroll	3,569	16.3	−2.2
Majority		2,392	10.9	N/A
Turnout		21,875	72.1	+30.5
Registered electors		30,359		
Labour gain from Unionist		Swing	+10.0	

General election 1923: North Lanarkshire
Party	Candidate	Votes	%	±%
Labour	Joseph Sullivan	10,526	50.5	+3.2
Unionist	Alexander McClure	7,165	34.3	−2.1
Liberal	Edward Rolland McNab	3,168	15.2	−1.1
Majority		3,361	16.2	+5.3
Turnout		20,859	65.3	−5.8
Registered electors		31,942		
Labour hold		Swing	+2.7	

General election 1924: North Lanarkshire
Party	Candidate	Votes	%	±%
Unionist	Alexander Sprot	13,880	53.9	+19.6
Labour	Joseph Sullivan	11,852	46.1	−4.4
Majority		2,028	7.8	N/A
Turnout		25,732	79.9	+14.6
Registered electors		32,194		
Unionist gain from Labour		Swing	+12.0	

1929 North Lanarkshire by-election
Party	Candidate	Votes	%	±%
Labour	Jennie Lee	15,711	57.5	+11.4
Unionist	Mungo Murray	9,133	33.4	−20.5
Liberal	Elizabeth Mitchell	2,488	9.1	New
Majority		6,578	24.1	N/A
Turnout		27,332	82.3	+2.4
Registered electors		33,215		
Labour gain from Unionist		Swing	+16.0	

General election 1929: North Lanarkshire
Party	Candidate	Votes	%	±%
Labour	Jennie Lee	19,884	55.9	+9.8
Unionist	Mungo Murray	15,680	44.1	−9.8
Majority		4,204	11.8	N/A
Turnout		35,564	78.6	−1.3
Registered electors		45,247		
Labour gain from Unionist		Swing	+9.8	

=== Elections in the 1930s ===
General election 1931: North Lanarkshire
Party	Candidate	Votes	%	±%
Unionist	William Anstruther-Gray	24,384	55.32	
Ind. Labour Party	Jennie Lee	19,691	44.68	
Majority		4,693	10.64	N/A
Turnout		44,075	82.24	
Unionist gain from Labour		Swing		

General election 1935: North Lanarkshire
Party	Candidate	Votes	%	±%
Unionist	William Anstruther-Gray	22,301	48.13	
Ind. Labour Party	Jennie Lee	17,267	37.27	
Labour	Gilbert McAllister	6,763	14.60	N/A
Majority		5,034	10.86	
Turnout		46,331	78.12	
Unionist hold		Swing		

=== Election in the 1940s ===
General election 1945: North Lanarkshire
Party	Candidate	Votes	%	±%
Labour	Peggy Herbison	30,251	59.62	
Unionist	William Anstruther-Gray	20,489	40.38	
Majority		9,762	19.24	N/A
Turnout		50,740	73.47	
Labour gain from Unionist		Swing		

=== Elections in the 1950s ===
General election 1950: North Lanarkshire
Party	Candidate	Votes	%	±%
Labour	Peggy Herbison	22,162	58.33	
Unionist	TD Ross	14,812	38.98	
Liberal	Robert Frank Brian Nelson	1,023	2.69	New
Majority		7,350	19.35	
Turnout		37,997	84.70	
Labour hold		Swing		

General election 1951: North Lanarkshire
Party	Candidate	Votes	%	±%
Labour	Peggy Herbison	22,304	58.23	
Unionist	William S How	16,000	41.77	
Majority		6,304	16.46	
Turnout		38,304	85.39	
Labour hold		Swing		

General election 1955: North Lanarkshire
Party	Candidate	Votes	%	±%
Labour	Peggy Herbison	20,307	57.87	
Unionist	Forbes Hendry	14,784	42.13	
Majority		5,523	15.74	
Turnout		35,091	81.51	
Labour hold		Swing		

General election 1959: North Lanarkshire
Party	Candidate	Votes	%	±%
Labour	Peggy Herbison	21,152	58.70	
Unionist	George Younger	14,883	41.30	
Majority		6,269	17.40	
Turnout		36,035	82.83	
Labour hold		Swing		

=== Elections in the 1960s ===
General election 1964: North Lanarkshire
Party	Candidate	Votes	%	±%
Labour	Peggy Herbison	23,385	60.62	
Unionist	John Corrie	15,192	39.38	
Majority		8,193	21.24	
Turnout		38,577	82.02	
Labour hold		Swing		

General election 1966: North Lanarkshire
Party	Candidate	Votes	%	±%
Labour	Peggy Herbison	23,160	60.92	
Conservative	Robert BJD Black	14,857	39.08	
Majority		8,303	21.84	
Turnout		38,017	78.76	
Labour hold		Swing		

=== Elections in the 1970s ===
General election 1970: North Lanarkshire
Party	Candidate	Votes	%	±%
Labour	John Smith	21,982	51.81	
Conservative	Robert BJD Black	16,963	39.98	
SNP	James Hutchison	3,486	8.22	New
Majority		5,019	11.83	
Turnout		42,431	77.73	
Labour hold		Swing		

General election February 1974: North Lanarkshire
Party	Candidate	Votes	%	±%
Labour	John Smith	21,448	48.42	
Conservative	AMS Pickering	14,664	33.10	
SNP	P Watt	8,187	18.48	
Majority		6,784	15.32	
Turnout		44,299	82.74	
Labour hold		Swing		

General election October 1974: North Lanarkshire
Party	Candidate	Votes	%	±%
Labour	John Smith	19,902	46.25	
SNP	P Watt	11,561	26.87	
Conservative	J Crichton	9,665	22.46	
Liberal	Alexander P. Brodie	1,899	4.41	New
Majority		8,341	19.38	
Turnout		43,027	79.46	
Labour hold		Swing		

General election 1979: North Lanarkshire
Party	Candidate	Votes	%	±%
Labour	John Smith	25,015	55.47	
Conservative	GJ Robertson	14,195	31.48	
SNP	J Ralston	5,887	13.05	
Majority		10,820	23.99	
Turnout		45,097	79.73	
Labour hold		Swing		
