= Cannock (constituency) =

Parliamentary constituency in the United Kingdom, 1918–1983

- Former county constituency for the House of Commons

1918–1983
- Seats: one
- Created from: Kingswinford, West Staffordshire and Lichfield
- Replaced by: Cannock & Burntwood and Mid Staffordshire

Cannock was a parliamentary constituency in Staffordshire which returned one Member of Parliament (MP) to the House of Commons of the Parliament of the United Kingdom from 1918 until it was abolished for the 1983 general election. It was effectively recreated in 1997 as the seat of Cannock Chase.

== Boundaries ==
1918–1955: The Urban Districts of Brownhills, Cannock, and Tettenhall, the Rural District of Seisdon, in the Rural District of Cannock the parishes of Bushbury, Cheslyn Hay, Essington, Great Wyrley, and Hilton, and in the Rural District of Walsall the parish of Bentley.

1955–1974: The Urban Districts of Cannock and Wednesfield, and the Rural District of Cannock.

1974–1983: The Urban Districts of Cannock and Rugeley, and the parish of Brindley Heath in the Rural District of Lichfield.

== Members of Parliament ==
Election	Member	Party
1918	James Parker	Coalition Labour
1922	William Adamson	Labour
1931	Sarah Ward	Conservative
1935	William Adamson	Labour
1945	Jennie Lee	Labour
1970	Patrick Cormack	Conservative
Feb 1974	Gwilym Roberts	Labour
1983	constituency abolished: see Cannock and Burntwood	

== Election results ==
=== Election in the 1910s ===
General election 1918: Cannock
Party		Candidate	Votes	%
C	Coalition Labour	James Parker	8,068	51.8
	Liberal	Beddoe Rees	7,493	48.2
Majority			575	3.6
Turnout			15,561	41.7
Registered electors			37,284	
	Coalition Labour win (new seat)			
C indicates candidate endorsed by the coalition government.

- Parker was incorrectly designated as a coalition Liberal nominee in the official list of coalition candidates.

=== Elections in the 1920s ===
General election 1922: Cannock
Party	Candidate	Votes	%	±%
Labour	William Adamson	9,889	36.8	New
Independent (National Liberal)	James Parker	9,116	33.8	–18.0
Liberal	Harold Sidney Abrahamson	7,928	29.4	–18.7
Majority		773	3.0	N/a
Turnout		26,933	66.9	+25.1
Registered electors		40,273		
Labour gain from Coalition Labour		Swing	+27.4	

General election 1923: Cannock
Party	Candidate	Votes	%	±%
Labour	William Adamson	11,956	41.4	+4.6
Unionist	Wallace Thorneycroft	9,438	32.7	New
Liberal	Geoffrey Mander	7,465	25.9	−3.5
Majority		2,518	8.7	+5.7
Turnout		28,859	70.5	+3.6
Registered electors		40,948		
Labour hold		Swing		

General election 1924: Cannock
Party	Candidate	Votes	%	±%
Labour	William Adamson	16,347	51.9	+10.5
Unionist	Wallace Thorneycroft	15,166	48.1	+15.4
Majority		1,181	3.8	−4.9
Turnout		31,513	74.2	+3.7
Registered electors		42,473		
Labour hold		Swing	−2.5	

General election 1929: Cannock
Party	Candidate	Votes	%	±%
Labour	William Adamson	26,388	54.2	+2.3
Unionist	Ralph Beaumont	15,055	30.9	−17.2
Liberal	Abraham Ray	7,282	14.9	N/A
Majority		11,333	23.3	+19.5
Turnout		48,725	77.5	+3.3
Registered electors		62,871		
Labour hold		Swing	+9.8	

=== Elections in the 1930s ===
General election 1931: Cannock
Party	Candidate	Votes	%	±%
Conservative	Sarah Ward	27,498	54.63	+23.7
Labour	William Adamson	22,833	45.37	−8.8
Majority		4,665	9.27	N/A
Turnout		50,331	75.95	
Conservative gain from Labour		Swing	+16.25	

General election 1935: Cannock
Party	Candidate	Votes	%	±%
Labour	William Adamson	27,922	50.95	+5.58
Conservative	Sarah Ward	26,876	49.05	−5.58
Majority		1,046	1.90	N/A
Turnout		54,798	71.41	−4.54
Labour gain from Conservative		Swing	+5.58	

=== Elections in the 1940s ===
General election 1945: Cannock
Party	Candidate	Votes	%	±%
Labour	Jennie Lee	48,859	62.57	+11.62
Conservative	CW Shelford	29,225	37.43	−11.62
Majority		19,634	25.14	+23.23
Turnout		78,084	71.34	−0.07
Labour hold		Swing	+11.62	

=== Elections in the 1950s ===
General election 1950: Cannock
Party	Candidate	Votes	%	±%
Labour	Jennie Lee	33,476	67.91	+5.34
National Liberal	Marjorie Hickling	15,818	32.09	−5.34
Majority		17,658	35.82	+10.68
Turnout		49,294	85.70	−14.36
Labour hold		Swing	+5.34	

General election 1951: Cannock
Party	Candidate	Votes	%	±%
Labour	Jennie Lee	32,379	66.87	−1.04
National Liberal	Alan Farrington	16,041	33.13	+1.04
Majority		16,338	33.74	−2.08
Turnout		48,420	83.12	−2.58
Labour hold		Swing	-1.04	

General election 1955: Cannock
Party	Candidate	Votes	%	±%
Labour	Jennie Lee	26,677	59.21	−7.66
National Liberal	John HR Newey	18,379	40.79	+7.66
Majority		8,298	18.42	−15.32
Turnout		45,056	76.95	−6.17
Labour hold		Swing	-7.66	

General election 1959: Cannock
Party	Candidate	Votes	%	±%
Labour	Jennie Lee	29,624	56.85	−2.36
National Liberal	Philip H Lugg	22,485	43.15	+2.36
Majority		7,139	13.70	−4.72
Turnout		52,109	79.59	+2.64
Labour hold		Swing	-2.36	

=== Elections in the 1960s ===
General election 1964: Cannock
Party	Candidate	Votes	%	±%
Labour	Jennie Lee	31,608	57.53	+0.68
Conservative	Charles John Prendergast Vereker	23,334	42.47	−0.68
Majority		8,274	15.06	+1.36
Turnout		54,942	76.15	−3.44
Labour hold		Swing	+0.68	

General election 1966: Cannock
Party	Candidate	Votes	%	±%
Labour	Jennie Lee	33,621	59.81	+2.28
Conservative	Harold R Elliston	22,594	40.19	−2.28
Majority		11,027	19.62	+4.56
Turnout		56,215	73.68	−2.47
Labour hold		Swing	+2.28	

=== Elections in the 1970s ===
General election 1970: Cannock
Party	Candidate	Votes	%	±%
Conservative	Patrick Cormack	32,665	51.2	+11.0
Labour	Jennie Lee	31,136	48.8	−11.0
Majority		1,529	2.40	N/A
Turnout		63,801	70.84	−2.84
Conservative gain from Labour		Swing	+11.01	

In an analysis of the voting trends at the 1970 general election, published shortly after the event, political scientist Richard Rose claimed that Jennie Lee's defeat in Cannock was "the biggest upset" of the contest. Rose believed that a large expansion in the electorate in the constituency contributed towards the 10.7% Labour to Conservative swing, which was significantly higher than the national average.

1970 notional result
Party	Vote	%
Labour	23,400	62.23
Conservative	14,200	37.77
Turnout	37,600	70.79
Electorate	53,117	

General election February 1974: Cannock
Party	Candidate	Votes	%	±%
Labour	Gwilym Roberts	23,869	51.46	−10.77
Conservative	Roger King	12,805	27.61	−10.16
Liberal	Michael Harry Windridge	9,709	20.93	New
Majority		11,064	23.85	−0.61
Turnout		46,383	82.70	+11.86
Labour hold		Swing		

General election October 1974: Cannock
Party	Candidate	Votes	%	±%
Labour	Gwilym Roberts	23,887	55.54	+4.08
Conservative	Eric Grenville Hill	11,665	27.12	−0.49
Liberal	Eric Freeman	7,459	17.34	−3.59
Majority		12,222	28.42	+0.57
Turnout		43,011	76.05	−6.65
Labour hold		Swing	+2.28	

General election 1979: Cannock
Party	Candidate	Votes	%	±%
Labour	Gwilym Roberts	25,050	52.76	−2.78
Conservative	J Vereker	17,704	37.28	+10.16
Liberal	PJ Davis	4,729	9.96	−7.38
Majority		7,346	15.48	−12.94
Turnout		47,483	79.79	+3.76
Labour hold		Swing	-6.47	
