= 1943 Bristol Central by-election =

UK by-election

The 1943 Bristol Central by-election was a by-election held on 18 February 1943 for the British House of Commons constituency of Bristol Central in the city of Bristol. The seat had become vacant when the constituency's Conservative Member of Parliament (MP) Lord Apsley had been killed on 17 December 1942, whilst on active service in the Second World War. He had been serving under the Arab Legion in Malta.

The Conservative Party selected as its candidate Violet Bathurst, Lady Apsley, who had married Lord Apsley in February 1924. During the Second World War the parties in the war-time Coalition Government had agreed not to contest any by-elections which occurred in seats held by Coalition parties. However, other parties and independents were free to stand, and some local parties fielded their own candidates as "independents" despite the truce. In Bristol Central, the former ILP MP Jennie Lee stood as an "Independent labour" candidate. The current ILP General Secretary, John McNair, also stood.

On a turnout less than half of that in the 1935 general election, Lady Apsley held the seat with a slightly increased majority.

== Result ==
Bristol Central by-election, 18 February 1943
Party	Candidate	Votes	%	±%
Conservative	Violet Apsley	5,867	52.1	−0.4
Independent Labour	Jennie Lee	4,308	38.2	New
Ind. Labour Party	John McNair	830	7.4	New
Independent	F. H. Dunn	258	2.3	New
Majority		1,559	13.9	+8.9
Turnout		11,263	32.9	−39.9
Conservative hold		Swing		

== See also ==
- Bristol Central constituency
- Lists of United Kingdom by-elections
