= Violet Bathurst, Lady Apsley =

British Conservative Party politician

Lady Apsley CBE
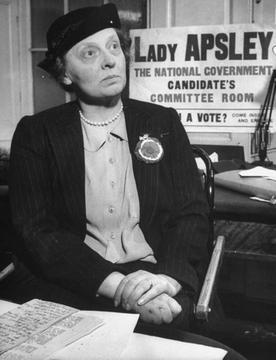

Member of Parliament for Bristol Central
- In office 18 February 1943 – 4 July 1945
- Preceded by: Allen Bathurst
- Succeeded by: Stan Awbery

Personal details
- Born: Violet Emily Mildred Meeking; 29 April 1895 Marylebone, London, England
- Died: 19 January 1966 (aged 70) Cirencester, Gloucestershire, England
- Party: Conservative
- Spouse: Allen Bathurst (m. 1924; died 1942)

Violet Emily Mildred Bathurst, Lady Apsley, CBE (née Meeking; 29 April 1895 – 19 January 1966) was a British Conservative Party politician. Upon the death of her husband, Lord Apsley, she succeeded him as Member of Parliament (MP) for Bristol Central in a 1943 by-election. She held the seat until 1945 when it was taken by Labour.

== Early life ==
Violet Mildred Emily Meeking was born on 29 April 1895 in Marylebone, London. She was the daughter of Captain Bertram Meeking of the 10th Hussars and his wife, Violet Charlotte (née Fletcher). She would later use the name "Viola".

During World War I she served with a Voluntary Aid Detachment as a nurse and ambulance driver at Marsh Court Military Hospital. She had an early interest in politics and was president of the Southampton Women's Conservative Association in 1924. Prior to her marriage, she lived at Richings Park, Iver, which had been held by the Bathurst family in the 17th century.

On 27 February 1924, she married Lord Apsley and they had two sons: Henry Allen John (1927–2011), the future Earl Bathurst, and George Bertram (1929–2010).

Apsley gained her pilot's licence in 1930. That year, she had a hunting accident which left her permanently disabled and unable to walk, needing a wheelchair.

Before the Second World War, Apsley and her husband supported pro-appeasement groups, sometimes speaking alongside fascist supporting speakers, and organised pro-appeasement talks in Bristol up to April 1939.

During the Second World War, she served in the Auxiliary Territorial Service as a welfare officer. She had held the rank of senior commandant (equivalent to major in the ATS since 17 October 1938. She resigned her commission on 12 July 1943, after being elected to Parliament.

== Parliamentary career ==
Her husband died in an aircraft accident in 1942, and she succeeded him as Member of Parliament (MP) for Bristol Central, winning a 1943 by-election with a majority of 1,559. Her maiden speech in parliament was made from her wheelchair. In the 1945 general election Lady Apsley lost her seat.

She contested the Bristol North East seat between 1947 and 1951, opposing the creation of the National Health Service and other elements of the welfare state, but was not re-elected to Parliament.

== Later life ==
Between 1952 and 1954 she was a member of the Central Council of the Victoria League. She held numerous offices in the Conservative Party, and was National Chairman of the Women's Section of the British Legion. She was made a Commander of the Order of the British Empire (CBE) in the 1952 Queen's Birthday Honours, "for public and social services".

== Notes ==
Parliament of the United Kingdom
Preceded by Lord Apsley	Member of Parliament for Bristol Central; 1943–1945	Succeeded by Stan Awbery
