= Betty Morgan (politician) =

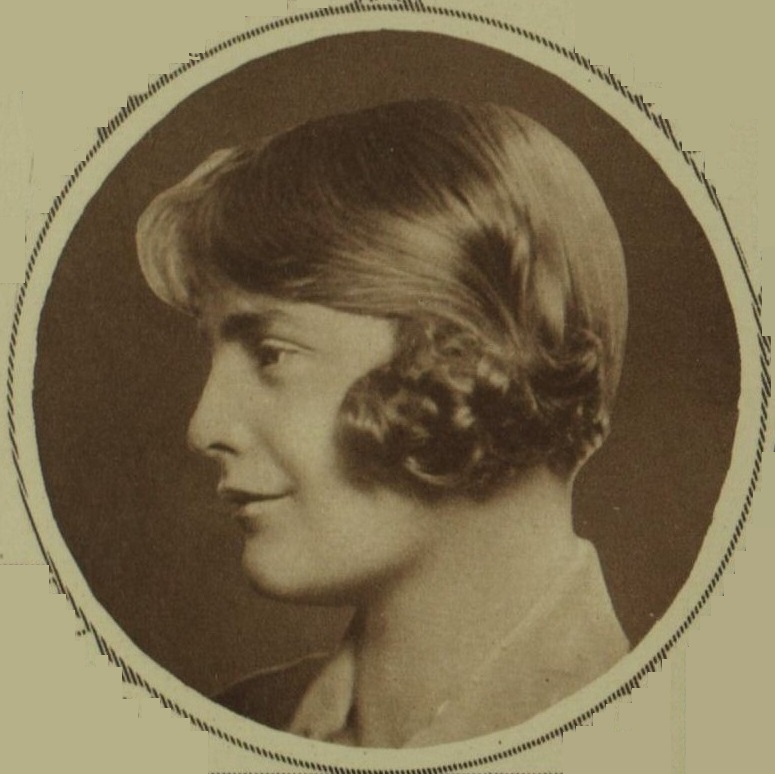
Betty Morgan

Elizabeth Trebelle Morgan (July 1904 – 1981), also called Betty Morgan and later Betty Morgan Popescu, was a Welsh writer, translator, scholar and Liberal Party politician. She was notably the youngest woman candidate in the 1929 General Election.

== Early life and education ==
She was born in Cardiff, a twin daughter of Mr and Mrs Oswald Morgan of Barry, Glamorgan. She was educated at the University of Wales where she received a Bachelor of Arts in 1925. In 1928, she was granted the degree of Doctor of Letters of the University of Paris-Sorbonne and awarded the gold medal of the Alliance française of Paris in the examination for the Diplôme Supérieur.

== Writing and translating career ==
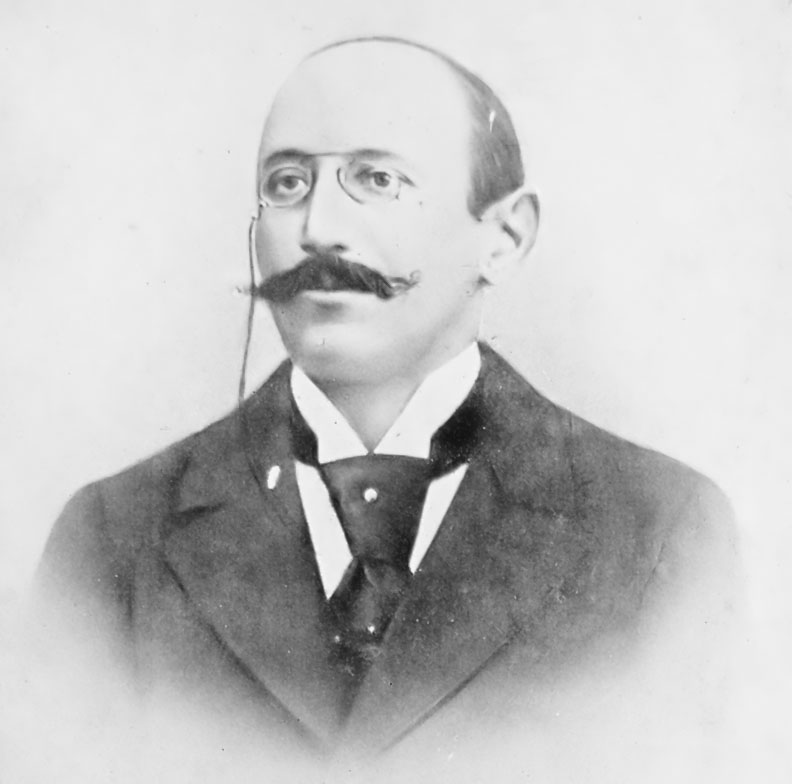
Alfred Dreyfus

She wrote Histoire du Journal des Sçavans depuis 1665 jusqu'en 1701, published in 1928. She used her French language skills as a translator of books such as Souvenirs Et Correspondance, a collection of letters during the Dreyfus affair by Alfred Dreyfus, published in 1937. The letters were contributed by Dreyfus' son Pierre after Alfred's death. In 1952, Morgan had English People Speak like This: Idiomatic English published.

== Political career ==
Both her parents were active members of the Liberal party in South Wales, so she and her sister had an early experience of political activity. In April 1929 she was selected as the second Liberal candidate for the Sunderland Division at the 1929 General Election. At the age of 24, this made her the youngest woman candidate in the election. This election was the first election in which women under the age of 30 were allowed to vote. She was not successful, but the fact that she was a 24-year-old woman did not appear to count against her as she managed to out-poll her older male running mate, who had the additional credibility of having been a former Member of Parliament.

General Election 1929: Sunderland
Party	Candidate	Votes	%	±%
Labour	✓ Marion Phillips	31,794	19.5	
Labour	✓ Alfred Smith	31,085	19.0	
Conservative	Sir Walter Raine	29,180	17.9	
Conservative	Luke Thompson	28,937	17.7	
Liberal	Elizabeth Trebelle Morgan	21,300	13.0	
Liberal	Sir John William Pratt	21,142	12.9	
Majority		1,905	1.1	
Turnout				
Labour gain from Conservative		Swing		

Two years later, she received an unexpected second chance at contesting Sunderland when one of the sitting Labour MPs died, causing the 1931 Sunderland by-election. Given the close nature of the contest last time between Conservative and Labour, the Liberals expected to see their vote squeezed, which is what happened;

1931 Sunderland by-election
Party	Candidate	Votes	%	±%
Conservative	Luke Thompson	30,497	40.3	
Labour	James Thomas Brownlie	30,074	39.8	
Liberal	Elizabeth Trebelle Morgan	15,020	19.9	
Majority		423	0.5	
Turnout			73.1	
Conservative gain from Labour		Swing		

However, Morgan's performance as a by-election candidate did impress Liberals in stronger constituencies who were looking for a new candidate. Shortly after she was selected as Liberal candidate for the Shrewsbury Division for the 1931 General Election. This was a seat the Liberals last won in 1923, and they had finished a strong second at the last general election. However, the creation of a National Government meant that her main opponent, the incumbent Conservative, could not easily be attacked by a Liberal whose party was a partner in that National Government. Despite this difficulty, she highlighted her support for free trade as being the most important issue that distinguished her from her tariff-supporting Conservative opponent. She even went to the extent of advising Liberals in her home constituency of Llandaff & Barry, who were without a Liberal candidate, to vote Labour because of free trade. She did still poll a respectable second place vote;

General Election 1931: Shrewsbury
Party	Candidate	Votes	%	±%
Conservative	George Arthur Victor Duckworth	18,505	60.8	
Liberal	Elizabeth Trebelle Morgan	9,358	30.8	
Labour	Edward Porter	2,567	8.4	
Majority		9,147	30.1	
Turnout		30,430	82.7	
Conservative hold		Swing		

Morgan did not stand for parliament again but remained active in the Liberal party, being a guest speaker at the 1938 conference of the Home Counties Liberal Federation. In the late 1930s she was particularly concerned with the effects of the Spanish Civil War. She became Organising Secretary of the Basque Children's Committee working alongside the MPs Katharine Stewart-Murray, Duchess of Atholl and Eleanor Rathbone. She was also actively involved with the Czech Refugee Trust.

== Later life ==
She married Eugene Popescu in Jun 1952 at Hampstead, Middlesex. and emigrated to Connecticut, USA where she worked as a translator for the United Nations. On retirement she moved to Zillingtal, Eisenstadt-Umgebung, Burgenland, Austria, where she died in 1981
