= Aline Mackinnon =

Aline Mackinnon

Aline Mackinnon (30 October 1899 – 1 January 1970) was a British radical feminist, Liberal Party politician and civil servant.

== Early life and education ==
Mackinnon was born in Hadley Wood, Middlesex, the third of four children born to Sir Percy Graham MacKinnon and Mabel Lockett. She was educated at Newnham College, Cambridge and the University of Edinburgh, where she graduated with a Master of Arts.

== Political career ==
In 1921 she attended the first Liberal Summer School. She was the Honorary Parliamentary Secretary to the Women's Liberal Federation. She was selected as Liberal candidate for Holderness and came second;

General Election 27 October 1931: Holderness Electorate 42,734
Party	Candidate	Votes	%	±%
Conservative	Samuel Servington Savery	21,560	61.7	
Liberal	Miss Aline Mackinnon	10,471	30.0	
Labour	J. L. Schulz	2,927	8.4	
Majority		11,089	31.7	
Turnout		34,958	81.8	

She was Honorary Secretary of the Liberal Summer School. She fought Holderness again in 1935, slightly reducing the Conservative majority;

General Election, 14 November 1935: Holderness Electorate 57,466
Party	Candidate	Votes	%	±%
Conservative	Samuel Servington Savery	22,229	53.6	−8.1
Liberal	Miss Aline Mackinnon	10,348	24.9	−5.1
Labour	J. L. Schulz	8,906	21.5	+13.1
Majority		11,901	28.7	−3.0
Turnout		41,503	72.2	−9.6
Conservative hold		Swing	-1.5	

She was given another opportunity to enter Parliament at the Holderness by-election on 15 February 1939. Despite the presence of a Labour candidate, she had some public support from prominent Labour people who supported the notion of a Popular Front. She had offered to withdraw if the Labour candidate withdrew in favour of an Independent Progressive candidate acceptable to both parties.

1939 Holderness by-election Electorate
Party	Candidate	Votes	%	±%
Conservative	Joseph Gurney Braithwaite	17,742	39.4	−14.2
Liberal	Miss Aline Mackinnon	11,590	25.7	+0.8
Labour	J. L. Schulz	9,629	21.3	−0.2
Independent	Raleigh Chichester-Constable	6,103	13.5	n/a
Majority				
Turnout				

Deprived by the outbreak of war of another attempt to be elected at Holderness, she retired from elective politics but continued to be active in the national party as a member of the Liberal Party Council, and for the Women's Liberal Federation, serving as Vice-President. She was a civil servant from 1941 to 1947. Her Women's Liberal colleague Frances Josephy described her as "very knowledgeable and a brilliant speaker with a pretty wit".

A keen skier and mountaineer, she died while on vacation in Austria, aged 70.
