= 1939 Holderness by-election =

UK parliamentary by-election

The 1939 Holderness by-election was a parliamentary by-election held on 15 February 1939 for the British House of Commons constituency of Holderness in the East Riding of Yorkshire.

== Vacancy ==
Sir Samuel Savery the sitting Conservative MP died aged 77 on 27 December 1938, creating a vacancy. He had been the MP since 1923.

== Electoral history ==
The constituency was created in 1885, since when it had been won by Conservative candidates at every election since, with the exception of 1922 when the Liberal Party won the seat. That Liberal success was during a time when only two parties contested the seat, Conservative and Liberal. The first time the Labour Party ran a candidate was in 1929 when the Conservatives won on a minority of the vote. Then, as with every subsequent election, the Labour Party came third. It was Savery who re-gained the seat for the Conservatives in 1923. Over the course of 5 successive election victories Savoury would have had the opportunity of building a large personal vote.

General election, 14 November 1935: Holderness Electorate 57,466
Party	Candidate	Votes	%	±%
Conservative	Samuel Savery	22,229	53.6	−8.1
Liberal	Aline Mackinnon	10,348	24.9	−5.1
Labour	Joseph Leopold Schultz	8,906	21.5	+13.1
Majority		11,901	28.7	−3.0
Turnout		41,503	72.2	−9.6
Conservative hold		Swing	-1.5	

== Candidates ==
- The Conservatives selected 43-year-old Gurney Braithwaite to defend the seat. He had been MP for Sheffield Hillsborough from 1931 until his defeat in 1935. Braithwaite contested Rotherhithe without success in 1929. He came from a Quaker family and was educated at Downs School, Colwall and Bootham School, York.
- On 10 January, the Liberal party re-adopted Aline Mackinnon. She had come second here at both the 1931 and 1935 general elections. She was a daughter of Sir Percy Mackinnon who was Chairman of Lloyd's. She was educated at Newnham College, Cambridge and the University of Edinburgh, where she graduated with a Master of Arts.
- Thirty-nine-year-old Hull Alderman Joseph Leopold Schultz was also re-selected by the local Labour party having come third at both the 1931 and 1935 general elections.
- A fourth candidate entered the contest, 48-year-old former Yorkshire cricketer, Lt-Col. Raleigh Chichester-Constable. He was a local farmer, Justice of the Peace and Deputy Lieutenant. He stood as an Independent, having been nominated by the Holderness Independent Political Discussion Group. He was quickly endorsed by the Holderness branch of the National Farmers Union.

Leading Labour politician, Sir Stafford Cripps was campaigning for a Popular Front where the Labour and Liberal parties, together with other parties on the left, would unite behind a single candidate to better challenge the National Government. His campaign had some support among elements of the Labour and Liberal parties and the tactic had been successful in returning an Independent Progressive supported by both parties at the 1938 Bridgwater by-election. In Holderness, there was some hope that the Labour party would not run a candidate, giving Mackinnon a free run at the Tory. However, Schultz seemed intent on standing. The Liberals also tried to get the Labour party to agree to support a joint Independent Progressive candidate, with Mackinnon offering to withdraw. The Labour party would not agree.

== Campaign ==
The presence of Chichester-Constable on the ballot paper was thought most likely to damage the Conservative candidate, particularly given his support among the farming community. The issue of Agriculture became one of the most important issues in the campaign. The National Farmers Union sent a questionnaire on farming policy to all four candidates so that they could provide feedback and voting guidance to their members. Miss Mackinnon said that the Liberal Party cared very much about the present sad condition of agriculture. Prosperity could only be restored by reducing the farmers' outgoings which had been made high by subsidies and tariffs. The Yorkshire Farmers Union held a Conference to which all four by-election candidates were invited. Only the Labour candidate, Leopold Schultz failed to attend. The Conference called for price insurance for farmers.

Despite there being no 'Popular Front' candidate, the Liberal campaign was given a boost when the Popular Front victor of the recent Bridgwater by-election, Vernon Bartlett sent a letter of support to Miss Mackinnon. Bartlett said it was "clear that Europe is preparing for another dangerous crisis in the near future between the forces of democracy and Fascism". Mackinnon also had some public support from prominent Labour people who wished to see the Conservative candidate beaten. The Chairman of Holderness Constituency Labour Party, Robert G. Newton, resigned and endorsed the Liberal candidate saying he would give support "for Miss Mackinnon, who I, as a Socialist, consider far more worthy of support than Alderman Schultz.". She also received a letter of support from leading Labour Party politician Sir Norman Angell. Right up until the close of nominations on 6 February the Liberals hoped that the Labour candidate could be persuaded to withdraw. While the Conservatives hoped that as with the 1939 East Norfolk by-election the 'farmers candidate' would withdraw.

The January/February campaign was influenced greatly by the weather. Blizzards made campaigning difficult.

Towards the end of the campaign, Chichester-Constable, the National Independent candidate, said that both the Liberal and Labour candidates had fought a clean campaign. However he criticised the Conservative campaign, "some of the misrepresentations by the other candidate had not been cricket."

== Result ==
The Conservatives held the seat with a substantially reduced majority. The combined Liberal and Labour vote was far greater than the Conservative vote, suggesting that an Independent Progressive candidate would have won the seat;

1939 Holderness by-election Electorate
Party	Candidate	Votes	%	±%
Conservative	Gurney Braithwaite	17,742	39.4	−14.2
Liberal	Aline Mackinnon	11,590	25.7	+0.8
Labour	Joseph Leopold Schultz	9,629	21.3	−0.2
Independent	Raleigh Chichester-Constable	6,103	13.5	New
Majority		6,152	13.7	−15.0
Turnout		45,064	77.2	+5.0
Conservative hold		Swing	-7.5	

After the election, Schultz ceased being Labour's candidate, indicating that the party may have decided not to contest the seat at a 1939/40 general election, allowing Mackinnon a straight fight with Braithwaite.

== Aftermath ==
Gurney Braithwaite saw active service with the RNVR before being re-elected in 1945. Deprived by the outbreak of war of another crack at Holderness, Aline Mackinnon retired from active politics.

General election, 5 July 1945
Party	Candidate	Votes	%	±%
Conservative	Gurney Braithwaite	25,181	43.1	+3.7
Labour	F. Lawson	23,036	39.5	+18.2
Liberal	Roger Fulford	10,165	17.4	−8.3
Majority		2,145	3.6	−25.1
Turnout		58,382	76.1	−1.1
Conservative hold		Swing		
