= Arthur Lockwood =

Arthur Lockwood may refer to:

- Arthur Lockwood (cricketer) (1903–1933), British first-class cricketer
- Arthur Lockwood (politician) (1883–1966), British political activist
