= Bramcote School =

Location
- Filey Road; Scarborough, North Yorkshire; England

Information
- Type: Preparatory school
- Established: 1893
- Founder: Samuel Savery
- Gender: Coeducational
- Age: 3 to 13
- Website: http://www.scarboroughcollege.co.uk/

Bramcote School was a preparatory school in Scarborough, North Yorkshire. In 2012, the school merged with Scarborough College and is now known as Scarborough College Prep School.

== History ==
Bramcote School was founded in 1893 by Samuel Savery, who started the first term of the school with only three boys. Savery retired from the school in 1911, and later became the Conservative Member of Parliament for Holderness in 1927, until his death in 1938. For most of its existence Bramcote was a boys boarding preparatory school, and its students would achieve places, or scholarships, at a wide range of England’s top public schools.

In 2012, the school merged with Scarborough College, situated just across the road. Three staff from Bramcote School moved on when the merger took place. Following the merger, Scarborough College Junior School was renamed Bramcote Junior School.

== Headmasters ==
- Samuel Savery (1893–1911)
- Douglas Slater (1909–1925)
- Richard Pidcock (1909–1945)
- Oswald Cooper (1930–1957)
- Jim Hornby (1957-1960s)
- Frank Hamerton (1957-1960s)
- Michael Coates (1960s-1969)
- Colin McGarrigle (1969–1983)
- John Fuller-Sessions (1970s–1990)
- John Gerrard (1980s–1992)
- John Walker (1992–1996)
- Peter Kirk (1996–2003)
- Andrew Lewin (2003–2006)
- Andrew Snow (2006–2012)
- Dan Davey (2012–2015)
- Chris Barker (2015–present)

== Notable alumni ==
- Geoffrey Vickers, winner of the Victoria Cross, former Deputy Director-General of the Ministry of Economic Warfare
- Denys Gillam, former RAF pilot
- Robert Irving, former RAF pilot and conductor
- Alan Webb, actor – stage and film
- JB Blanc, actor – stage, television and film
- James Norton, actor – stage, television and film.

Attending Bramcote in the 1970s were a series of notable alumni, including Lord Justice Stephen Cobb, appointed President of the Family Division in 2026; Jonathan Lord, the Member of Parliament for Woking from 2010 to 2024; Sir George Hollingbery, the Member of Parliament for Meon Valley from 2010 to 2019; and Jeremy “Jay” Jopling, art dealer and gallerist and founder of the international contemporary art gallery White Cube.

== Bibliography ==
- Land, Pip (1993). Bramcote School: The First 100 Years. Durham: The Pentland Press. ISBN 1858210682.
