= Christopher Price (politician) =

British politician

Member of Parliament for Lewisham West
- In office 28 February 1974 – 13 May 1983
- Preceded by: John Gummer
- Succeeded by: John Maples

Member of Parliament for Birmingham Perry Barr
- In office 31 March 1966 – 29 May 1970
- Preceded by: Wyndham Davies
- Succeeded by: Joseph Kinsey

Personal details
- Born: 26 January 1932 Leeds, United Kingdom
- Died: 20 February 2015 (aged 83) London, United Kingdom
- Party: Labour
- Spouse: Annie Grierson Ross (m. 1956)
- Children: 3
- Relatives: Helen Jackson (sister)

Christopher Price (26 January 1932 – 20 February 2015) was a Labour Party politician in the United Kingdom.

== Early life ==
Price was educated at Leeds Grammar School and The Queen's College, Oxford where he was secretary of the Labour Club in 1953. He initially pursued a teaching career and by 1962 was Senior Classics Master at Ecclesfield Grammar School when he was elected as a councillor to the Sheffield City Council. He became deputy chairman of the education committee from 1963 (Albert Ballard was the chairman) and was instrumental in Sheffield's decision, fully implemented by 1969, in favour of comprehensive education.

== Parliamentary career ==
Price contested Shipley in 1964. He was Member of Parliament for Birmingham Perry Barr from 1966 to 1970, during which time, from 1966 to 1967, he served as the parliamentary private secretary to Anthony Crosland. He was MP for Lewisham West from February 1974 to 1983, when he lost to the Conservative John Maples. In the House of Commons he served as Chairman of the Education Select Committee.

Price was also a Member of the European Parliament from 1977 to 1978.

== After Parliament ==
After leaving parliament, Price was Director of Leeds Polytechnic - later becoming Vice-Chancellor of the polytechnic's successor body, Leeds Metropolitan University. He was a founder member of the British Committee for the Reunification of the Parthenon Marbles.

Price was the Chairman of the New Statesman between 1994 and 1995.

Price was interviewed in 2012 as part of The History of Parliament's oral history project.

== Personal life ==
His sister, Helen Jackson, was the Labour MP for Sheffield Hillsborough from 1992 to 2005.

Price married Annie Grierson Ross, a nurse, in 1956. They had three children; one daughter and two sons. He died on 20 February 2015, aged 83.

Parliament of the United Kingdom
Preceded by Wyndham Davies	Member of Parliament for Birmingham Perry Barr; 1966–1970	Succeeded by Joseph Kinsey
Preceded by John Gummer	Member of Parliament for Lewisham West; February 1974–1983	Succeeded by John Maples
