= Arthur Neal =

British politician

Arthur Neal

Arthur Neal (23 September 1862 – 29 January 1933) was a British politician.

Born in Sheffield, Neal attended Wesley College before becoming a solicitor. He was also the President of Sheffield's Chamber of Commerce.

== Political career ==
Neal was elected to Sheffield City Council as a Liberal in 1903, holding a seat until 1921.

He stood for Parliament in Sheffield Hallam at both the January and December 1910 UK general elections. At the 1918 election, he won the new constituency of Sheffield Hillsborough as a supporter of the Lloyd George Coalition.

In October 1919 he was appointed Parliamentary Private Secretary to the Paymaster-General. After hearing Neal speak in the House of Commons, Prime Minister Lloyd George appointed Neal as Parliamentary Secretary to the Ministry of Transport, at that time he had been in the House less than 12 months.

In 1922, Neal lost his seat, and in 1923 and 1924, he instead stood in Bassetlaw, before trying Gainsborough in 1929.

=== Electoral record ===
General election January 1910: Sheffield Hallam
Party	Candidate	Votes	%	±%
Conservative	Charles Stuart-Wortley	6,181	50.9	
Liberal	Arthur Neal	5,965	49.1	
Majority		216	1.8	
Turnout			89.8	
Conservative hold		Swing		

General election December 1910: Sheffield Hallam
Party	Candidate	Votes	%	±%
Conservative	Charles Stuart-Wortley	5,788	50.9	+0.0
Liberal	Arthur Neal	5,593	49.1	+0.0
Majority		195	1.8	+0.0
Turnout			84.1	−5.7
Conservative hold		Swing	+0.0	

General election 1918: Sheffield Hillsborough
Party	Candidate	Votes	%	±%
Liberal	Arthur Neal	11,171	73.4	n/a
Co-operative Party	Arthur Lockwood	4,050	26.6	n/a
Majority		7,121	46.8	n/a
Turnout			42.2	n/a
Liberal win				

General election 1922: Sheffield Hillsborough
Party	Candidate	Votes	%	±%
Labour Co-op	A. V. Alexander	15,130	56.2	+29.6
National Liberal	Arthur Neal	11,812	43.8	−29.6
Majority		3,318	12.4	59.2
Turnout			74.7	+32.5
Labour Co-op gain from Liberal		Swing	+29.6	

General election 1923: Bassetlaw
Party	Candidate	Votes	%	±%
Unionist	Sir Ellis Hume-Williams	10,419	42.3	−12.9
Liberal	Arthur Neal	7,247	29.4	n/a
Labour	Malcolm MacDonald	6,973	28.3	−16.5
Majority		3,172	12.9	+2.5
Turnout			76.6	+2.2
Unionist hold		Swing	n/a	

General election 1924: Bassetlaw
Party	Candidate	Votes	%	±%
Unionist	Sir Ellis Hume-Williams	12,732	46.3	+4.0
Labour	Malcolm MacDonald	11,283	41.0	+12.7
Liberal	Arthur Neal	3,505	12.7	−16.7
Majority		1,449	5.3	−7.6
Turnout			81.8	+5.2
Unionist hold		Swing	−4.3	

General election 1929: Gainsborough
Party	Candidate	Votes	%	±%
Unionist	Harry Crookshank	10,058	37.1	−10.0
Liberal	Arthur Neal	9,991	36.9	+11.3
Labour	George Deer	7,032	26.0	−1.3
Majority		67	0.2	−19.6
Turnout				
Unionist hold		Swing	−10.7	

Parliament of the United Kingdom
New constituency	Member of Parliament for Sheffield Hillsborough; 1918–1922	Succeeded by A. V. Alexander
Political offices
Preceded by Rhys Rhys Williams	Parliamentary Secretary to the Ministry of Transport; 1919–1922	Succeeded by Wilfrid Ashley
