= Neville Dixey =

British Liberal Party politician

- Born: Charles Neville Douglas Dixey; 7 November 1881; Stoke Newington, London, England
- Died: 6 March 1947 (aged 65); Hertford, Hertfordshire, England
- Occupation: Insurance Underwriter
- Known for: Chairman of Lloyd's of London

Charles Neville Douglas Dixey (7 November 1881 – 6 March 1947), known as Neville Dixey, was a British Liberal Party politician who was Chairman of Lloyd's of London three times, as an underwriter he specialised in the marine insurance market.

== Background ==
He was the eldest son of Charles Douglas Dixey. He was educated privately. He married, in 1913, Marguerite Isabel Groser. They had three sons. One son Paul, was also Chairman of Lloyds in the 1970s.

== Professional career ==
He was an underwriting member of Lloyd's. In 1928 he became an elected Member of Committee of Lloyd’s. He was Chairman of Lloyds in 1931, 1934 and 1936. In 1936 while Chairman of Lloyd's he was involved in discussions with the Chancellor of the Exchequer regarding budget leaks to members of the stock exchange which resulted in J.H.Thomas, the Secretary of State for the Colonies being forced to resign.

== Political career ==
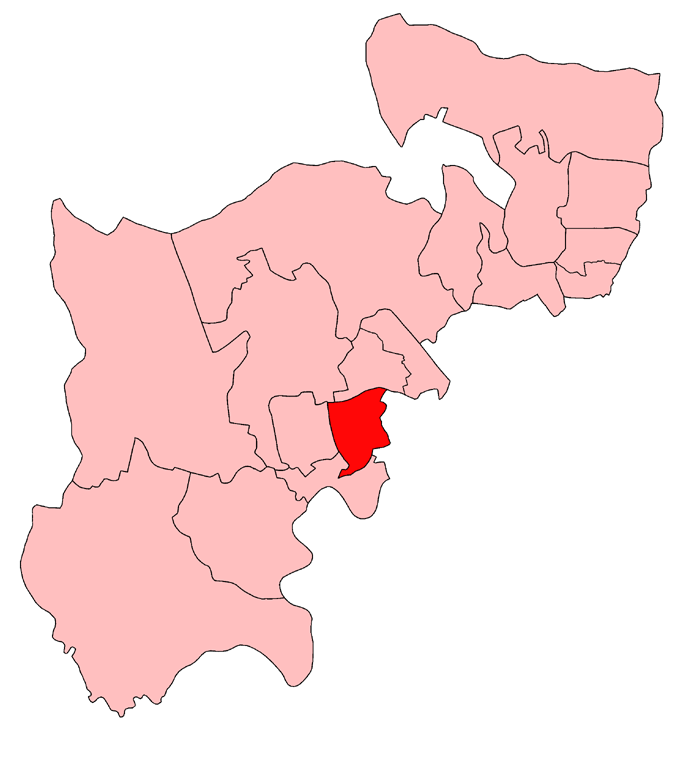
Acton in Middlesex, 1922

Dixey served as a Justice of the peace in Hertfordshire. He was Liberal candidate for the Acton Division of Middlesex at the 1922 General Election. Acton had been a new seat in 1918 that had been won by a Unionist. It was in a part of Middlesex that had always returned Unionists. The Liberals had not even run a candidate in 1918 and unsurprisingly he finished in third place. He was next Liberal candidate for the Southampton Division at the 1923 General Election. Southampton was a two-member constituency that the Liberals had lost to the Unionists in 1922. At the 1923 elections, he and his running mate finished behind the Unionist and Labour candidates. He was then Liberal candidate for the Holderness Division of Yorkshire at the 1924 General Election. This was a Unionist seat that had last been won by a Liberal in 1922 and had only been narrowly lost in 1923. He may have entertained hopes of winning but the 1924 elections were not good for the Liberals;

General Election 29 October 1924: Holderness Electorate 28,449
Party	Candidate	Votes	%	±%
Unionist	Samuel Servington Savery	12,911	56.0	+5.4
Liberal	Charles Neville Douglas Dixey	10,162	44.0	−5.4
Majority		2,749	12.0	10.8
Turnout		23,073	81.1	+3.0
Unionist hold		Swing	+5.4	

In November 1924 he was immediately re-selected as prospective Liberal parliamentary candidate for Holderness. He spent the next 5 years nursing the constituency in preparation for another general election. With the Liberal party experiencing something of a revival he will have had genuine hopes of winning. However, in 1929, the Labour party, who had not run a candidate in Holderness before, decided to intervene and took away enough votes from Dixey to allow the Unionist to hang on;

1929 United Kingdom general election: Holderness Electorate 38,147
Party	Candidate	Votes	%	±%
Unionist	Samuel Servington Savery	14,544	47.6	−8.4
Liberal	Charles Neville Douglas Dixey	13,525	44.3	+0.3
Labour	Joseph William Hewitt	2,481	8.1	n/a
Majority		1,019	3.3	−8.7
Turnout			80.1	−1.0
Unionist hold		Swing	-4.4	

He did not stand for parliament again. His wife Marguerite remained active in the Liberal party throughout the 1930s and into the 1940s as Honorary Secretary of the Women's Liberal Federation, and also serving on the Liberal party National Executive.

== Family ==
Dixey’s granddaughter, Judy Dixey, was elected a Liberal Democrat councillor in Camden, London, in May 2022.
