= Helen Jackson (politician) =

British politician

Helen Jackson CBE

Member of Parliament for Sheffield Hillsborough
- In office 9 April 1992 – 11 April 2005
- Preceded by: Martin Flannery
- Succeeded by: Angela Smith

Personal details
- Born: 19 May 1939 (age 87)
- Party: Labour
- Spouse: Keith Jackson (divorced)
- Education: St Hilda's College, Oxford

Helen Margaret Jackson CBE (née Price; born 19 May 1939) is a British former Labour Party politician.

== Early life ==
She attended the independent Berkhamsted School for Girls and read Modern History at St Hilda's College, Oxford, graduating from Oxford University in 1960, and then the C.F. Mott College of Education (which later became part of Liverpool Polytechnic), gaining a Postgraduate Certificate in Education (PGCE) in 1972. Between 1960 and 1961, she worked as assistant librarian at the Queen's College, Oxford. From 1961 to 1962, Jackson was an assistant teacher in Stoke on Trent. She was a teacher in Lancashire between 1972 and 1974, and in Sheffield from 1974 from 1980. Jackson was on Labour's National Executive Committee.

== Parliamentary career ==
Jackson was Labour Member of Parliament for Sheffield Hillsborough from 1992 until she stepped down at the 2005 general election.

Jackson was appointed Commander of the Order of the British Empire (CBE) in the 2010 New Year Honours for her services to the Women and Pensions Network and the community in South Yorkshire.

== Family ==
She married Keith Jackson in 1960, but the couple divorced in 1998. They have two sons and one daughter. Her son, David Jackson, is a United Nations official. Her brother, Christopher Price, was the Labour MP for Birmingham Perry Barr from 1966 to 1970, and for Lewisham West from February 1974 to 1983.

Parliament of the United Kingdom
Preceded by Martin Flannery	Member of Parliament for Sheffield Hillsborough; 1992–2005	Succeeded by Angela Smith
