= George Bethell =

Bethell in 1895.

George Richard Bethell (March 1849 – 3 December 1919) was a Royal Navy officer and Conservative politician.

Bethell was born at Kingston-upon-Hull, the son of William Froggatt Bethell. He joined the Royal Navy and served in the Egyptian war. In 1881 he was a lieutenant student at the Royal Naval College, Greenwich. He reached the rank of Commander and at the 1885 general election he was elected member of parliament (MP) for Holderness. In June 1899 he was authorized to assume the rank of captain. He fell out with his constituents over his hostility to the government's South African policy, and the Holderness Conservative Association in February 1900 voted that he had "alienated the confidence of the party which returned him at the last election, and that it is impossible to accord him their support in the future." He did not stand for the general election held in October that year. On 28 June 1919, he was appointed a deputy lieutenant of the East Riding of Yorkshire, but died towards the end of the year.

He lived at Rise Park, Hull, and 43, Curzon Street, London and in 1893 he acquired Sigglesthorne Hall, Holderness.

Parliament of the United Kingdom
| New constituency | Member of Parliament for Holderness; 1885–1900 | Succeeded by Arthur Stanley Wilson |
