= Ernest Woodhead =

England international rugby union player

- Full name: Ernest Woodhead
- Born: 2 February 1857 Huddersfield, England
- Died: 10 June 1944 (aged 87) Huddersfield, England

Rugby union career
- Position: Forwards
Senior career
Years	Team	Apps	(Points)
-1895	Huddersfield		
International career
Years	Team	Apps	(Points)
1880	England	1	(0)

Ernest Woodhead (2 February 1857 – 10 June 1944) was an English rugby union footballer who played in the 1880s. He played at representative level for England, and at club level for Huddersfield, as a forward, e.g. front row, lock, or back row. Prior to Tuesday 27 August 1895, Huddersfield was a rugby union club.

== Background ==
Ernie Woodhead was born in Huddersfield, West Riding of Yorkshire, he was the son of Joseph Woodhead, Liberal Party Member of parliament for Spen Valley, he died aged 87 in Huddersfield, West Riding of Yorkshire.

== Playing career ==
Ernie Woodhead won a cap for England while at Huddersfield in 1880 against Ireland.

== Political career ==
He was active for the Liberal Party in Huddesfield local politics for many years, being a member of Huddesfield Borough Council, including serving as Mayor of Huddesfield. For the 1918 General Election he stood as Liberal Party candidate for Huddersfield, however, another Liberal candidate also stood but with the support of the Coalition Government. As a result, he finished third. For the 1923 General Election, he was Liberal Party candidate for Sheffield Hillsborough and finished third. For the 1924 General Election he was Liberal Party candidate for Pudsey & Otley and again finished third. He did not stand for parliament again.
