= George Darling, Baron Darling of Hillsborough =

George Darling, Baron Darling of Hillsborough, PC (20 July 1905 – 18 October 1985) was a politician in the United Kingdom. He was Labour Co-operative Member of Parliament for Sheffield Hillsborough from 1950 to 1974.

== Early life and education ==
Darling's grandfather, Thomas Darling, was agent for James Tomkinson, Liberal MP for Crewe from 1900 to 1910. He was educated at elementary school in Crewe, and started work at 14 in the railway sheds of the town. After being made redundant in 1926 he matriculated at Liverpool University, before going on to attend Magdalene College, Cambridge, where he became chair of the Cambridge University Labour Club; he graduated with a degree in economics in 1930, gaining a lower-class second in Part I of the tripos and a third in Part II.

== Career ==
After Cambridge Darling chose to enter journalism, before becoming the head of research and information at the Co-operative Wholesale Society from 1930 to 1937. He then joined the Reynolds News until 1942 before becoming industrial correspondent for the BBC reporting team from 1942 to 1949. He wrote several books on the co-operative movement. Darling contested Macclesfield without success in 1935.

He was elected for Hillsborough in 1950, succeeding A. V. Alexander, then the best known Co-operative MP. Darling was a party spokesman in opposition on Board of Trade subjects and consumer protection. Following Labour's 1964 election victory, Darling became Minister of State at the Board of Trade, stepping down in 1968. He was President of the Institute of Trading Standards Administration (today the Trading Standards Institute) and secured legislation regulating car insurance and the descriptions of consumer goods. He was appointed a Privy Counsellor in 1966.

Darling retired from the House of Commons at the February 1974 general election. On 3 July of the same year, he was created a life peer as Baron Darling of Hillsborough, of Crewe in Cheshire.

Darling was a member of the Council of the National Fund for Polio Research.

Parliament of the United Kingdom
Preceded by A. V. Alexander	Member of Parliament for Sheffield Hillsborough; 1950–February 1974	Succeeded by Martin Flannery
