= Stanley Wilson (British politician) =

British politician

Arthur Stanley Wilson (30 July 1868 – 12 April 1938) was a Conservative Party politician in England. He was the son of the Hull-based shipowner and prominent local Liberal Arthur Wilson, who was best known nationally for hosting the party at his Tranby Croft home, which led to the royal baccarat scandal.

He was educated at Eton College and Magdalene College, Cambridge.

At the 1900 general election, Wilson was elected as member of parliament (MP) for Holderness. He held the seat until his defeat at the 1922 general election by the Liberal candidate William Bowdler, after which he did not stand again.

Wilson was not a frequent participant in Parliamentary debates, but Hansard records his first contribution in House of Commons debates as being a question in December 1900 asking the government "to provide for the safety of the public by framing regulations to ensure that all drivers of motor cars shall submit to a test and hold a certificate as competent drivers". Driving licences were not introduced in the United Kingdom until the 1930s.

He was commissioned a lieutenant in the Middlesex Militia, then resigned and became a captain in the East Riding of Yorkshire Yeomanry in December 1902, later transferring to become a captain in the Territorial Force Reserve Yeomanry. During the First World War, he was captured and became a prisoner of war while acting as a King's Messenger. He had been conveying letters from the Eastern Mediterranean to London when the neutral Greek steamer, Spetzia, on which he was travelling from Piraeus to Messina in Italy, was intercepted by an Austrian submarine.

He was released in 1917.

He married Alice Cecile Agnes Filmer, the daughter of Sir Edmund Filmer, and was succeeded by his son Arthur Thomas Wilson, who later changed his surname to Wilson-Filmer.

Parliament of the United Kingdom
Preceded by George Bethell	Member of Parliament for Holderness; 1900–1922	Succeeded by William Bowdler
