= Scarborough College =

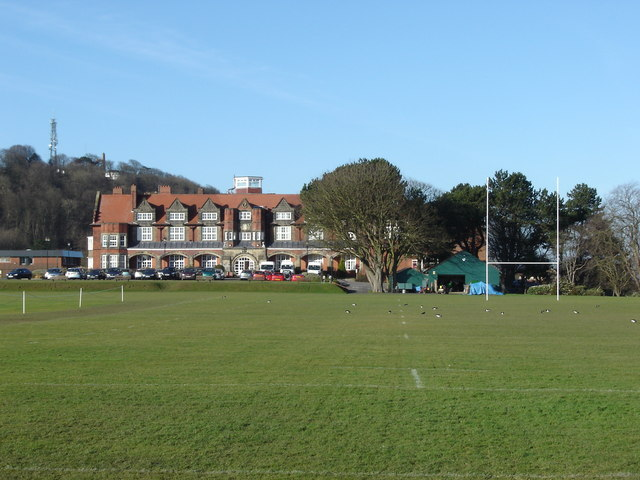

Location
- Filey Road; Scarborough, North Yorkshire, YO11 3BA; England
- Coordinates: 54.26454°N 0.39676°W

Information
- Type: Private day and boarding
- Established: 1896
- Department for Education URN: 121730 Tables
- Chair of the Governors: Guy Robinson
- Headmaster: Guy Emmett
- Gender: Coeducational
- Age: 3 to 18
- Enrolment: ~575 pupils
- Website: www.scarboroughcollege.co.uk

Scarborough College is a private coeducational day and boarding school aged 3–18 years in Scarborough, North Yorkshire, England. It was founded in 1898 and opened in 1901. The school has been an International Baccalaureate (IB) World School since June 2006, offering it at sixth form in place of A-levels.

== History ==
The foundation stone for Scarborough College was laid in 1898, and the school opened on 18 September 1901. The building was designed by Edwin Cooper and later became Grade II listed. By 1907, the school had 70 boys. Following the German Navy's Raid on Scarborough, Hartlepool and Whitby in December 1914, the headmaster decided Scarborough was too unsafe for pupils so the school evacuated to Park Hotel, Keswick for a year. During World War II, pupils were evacuated to Marske Hall, Swaledale, from 1940 to 1946. The Royal Air Force (RAF) commandeered the school site and used it as the base of No. 17 Initial Training Wing, which provided basic training in aircraft mechanics, navigation, meteorology, drill, and physical fitness. Among the trainees who graduated No. 17 ITW was Michael Beetham, later Chief of the Air Staff during the Falklands War.

A considerable fire took place at the school on 10 October 1961, burning down the library and cupola, which were both rebuilt. In 1972, the school became coeducational, accepting girls for the first time. In 2000, Lisvane Prep School moved from Sandybed Lane to the main school site on Filey Road. The school adopted the International Baccalaureate in place of A-levels in 2006. In 2012, Scarborough College and local prep school Bramcote School merged, and Lisvane was renamed to Bramcote. The outgoing head of Bramcote School, Dan Davey, became the new headmaster of Bramcote Junior School.

== Pre-School and Prep school ==
Scarborough College's Prep School was moved on to the main campus of the college on Filey Road in 2002. It is currently housed in a modern, purpose-built building, separate from the college's historic main building. The Prep School was formerly known as Lisvane, but was renamed Scarborough College Junior School in 2010. In 2012, the college merged with local preparatory school Bramcote, and was renamed as Bramcote Junior School. The head of the prep school is Chris Barker.

The Pre-School, known locally also as Little Owls, is based in part of the new purpose-built building for the Prep school. However, in 2014 it moved to the old premises of Bramcote School across the road. Little Owls is currently led by Jackie Hunter.

== Senior school and sixth form ==
The senior school is housed in the college's main building. The campus also consists of a separate Science and ICT block, a sports hall, astroturf and performing arts theatre. Pupils study a mix of GCSE and IGCSE qualifications in Years 10 and 11. Classes are taught in classrooms and there are a range of sport, ICT, music and drama facilities. The school also has access to an athletics track, rugby field, and sports hall at the former Bramcote site, further down Filey Road. This field serves as the 1st XV Rugby Team’s home field.

For the sixth form there is the provision of a study centre, private ICT facilities and a separate dining area and cafe. The current Head of Sixth Form is Katie Cooke.

== List of headteachers ==
Tenure		Headteacher
1901	1933	Percy Armstrong
1933	1937	Alfred Russell Woolley
1937	1956	H. E. Pegg
1957	1974	Denys Crews MBE
1974	1985	Richard Wilkinson
1985	1995	David Hempsall
1996	2008	Tim Kirkup
2009	2010	Jonathan Lee
2010	2015	Isobel Nixon
2015	2019	Charles Ellison
2019	Present	Guy Emmett

== Notable former pupils ==
- David Byas, cricketer
- Ian Carmichael, actor
- Simon Dennis, cricketer
- Richard Doughty, cricketer
- Chris Gilbert, cricketer
- Richard Gilbert, cricketer
- John Hick, philosopher of religion and theologian
- Bentley Collingwood Hilliam, musician and comedian
- Robert Holtby, Anglican priest and author
- Richard Hurndall, actor
- Charles Laughton, actor and director
- Phillip Mann, science fiction author
- Mark Precious, Olympic Bronze Medalist in Field Hockey
- Senna Proctor, racing driver
- Wilf Proudfoot, former Member of Parliament and businessman
- Graham Farrow, playwright, screenwriter
- Ken Webster, hypnotist and performer

== Arms ==
Coat of arms of Scarborough College
Notes Granted 20 December 1963. Crest Perched on a mural crown Gules an owl Proper between two sprigs of laurel vert. Torse On a wreath Argent and Vert. Escutcheon Per chevron enarched Azure and Sable in chief a sun issuant Or and in base a dolphin haurient Argent. Motto Pensez Fort

== See also ==
- Listed buildings in Scarborough (Weaponness and Falsgrave Park Wards)
