= Chris Gilbert (cricketer) =

English cricketer

Personal information
- Full name: Christopher Robert Gilbert
- Born: 16 April 1984 (age 42); Scarborough, North Yorkshire, England
- Height: 5 ft 10 in (1.78 m)
- Batting: Right-handed
- Bowling: Right-arm fast-medium
- Role: All-rounder

Domestic team information
- Years: Team
- 2002: Yorkshire Cricket Board
- 2006–2007: Yorkshire (squad no. 18)
- Only FC: 16 May 2007 Yorkshire v Loughborough UCCE
- LA debut: 29 August 2002 Yorkshire Cricket Board v Northamptonshire
- Last LA: 31 July 2007 Yorkshire v Sri Lanka A

Career statistics
Competition	FC	LA	T20
Matches	1	6	13
Runs scored	64	68	107
Batting average	64.00	13.60	15.28
100s/50s	0/1	0/0	0/0
Top score	64	37	36*
Balls bowled	18	220	–
Wickets	0	8	–
Bowling average	–	29.00	–
5 wickets in innings	–	0	–
10 wickets in match	–	0	–
Best bowling	–	3/33	0/–
Catches/stumpings	1/–	3/–	7/–
- Source: CricketArchive, 22 August 2007

Christopher Robert Gilbert (born 16 April 1984) is an English first-class cricketer, who represented England at various age levels. A talented all-round sportsman, he has also played hockey for England under 18s. He played cricket for Yorkshire County Cricket Club at first-class level in 2007. An all rounder, he bowls right arm medium pace and is a right-handed batsman.

Gilbert was born in Scarborough, North Yorkshire, England, and attended Scarborough College. He made his Yorkshire one day debut against Leicestershire on 16 June 2006. Yorkshire lost the game, but Gilbert claimed 3 wickets for 33. He also played Twenty/20 cricket for Yorkshire in 2006, and made his first-class debut against Loughborough UCCE in May 2007. He scored 64 runs in his only innings, and took 0 for 11 with his bowling, plus one catch. He was released by Yorkshire at the end of that season.

In 2008, he signed for Scarborough, in Perth, Australia. In the 2014/15 season, he joined Swan Athletic Caversham Cricket Club, who play in the top flight of the WASTCA competition. Gilbert was appointed the captaincy of the cricket club in the 2015/16 season.
