= Martin Flannery (British politician) =

British politician (1918–2006)

Member of Parliament for Sheffield Hillsborough
- In office 1974–1992

Personal details
- Born: 2 March 1918 Hillsborough, England
- Died: 16 October 2006
- Party: Labour (after 1956); Communist (until 1956)
- Children: 3
- Education: Sheffield College of Education and Sheffield Teachers' Training College
- Military career
- Allegiance: United Kingdom
- Branch: Army
- Units: 1st Battalion, Royal Scots
- Conflicts: World War II

Martin Henry Flannery (2 March 1918 – 16 October 2006) was a British politician. Originally a communist, he continued to hold decidedly left-wing views after he joined the Labour Party, and was Member of Parliament for Sheffield Hillsborough for 18 years, from February 1974 to 1992.

== Early life ==
Flannery was born in Hillsborough, in Sheffield. His father, who was born in County Tipperary, was a foreman at a steel works (and a former soldier in the Royal Dublin Fusiliers). His mother was born in Sheffield, but was of Irish parentage on both sides. He was educated at the Sacred Heart School in Hillsborough and the local Catholic grammar school De La Salle College, which is now All Saints. He attended Sheffield College of Education and Sheffield Teachers' Training College, and began to work as a teacher, but then volunteered to join the British Army in the Second World War. He joined the 1st Battalion, Royal Scots; he was sent to India in 1942, and was wounded in Burma in 1945. He was a warrant officer when he was demobilised.

He married in 1949, and had one son and two daughters.

== Teaching ==
He resumed teaching at a primary school in Sheffield in 1946. He was opposed to corporal punishment. He became headteacher of Crookesmoor Junior School in Sheffield in 1969. He was a left-wing member of the National Union of Teachers, and was a member of the NUT national executive from 1970 to 1974. He had joined the Communist Party of Great Britain following his demobilisation in 1945, but left after the Hungarian Revolution of 1956, when he realised that Soviet claims of democracy were a sham.

== Politics ==
He was elected as Member of Parliament for Sheffield Hillsborough at the February 1974 general election. He held off strong Liberal Party challenges to his position in the 1983 and 1987 general elections, surviving by 1,546 votes (2.8%) on the former occasion. He was also challenged for his seat by fellow Labour left-winger Clive Betts in 1985.

== Activism ==
Politically, he was a Communist until the Hungarian Revolution of 1956 was crushed by the Soviet Union; subsequently, he became a strong critic of Stalinism, and a strong advocate of human rights, with close links to Amnesty International. He joined the Labour party, but remained on the far left; his wife remained a Communist until the Communist Party of Great Britain was disbanded. He held anti-Zionist (but not anti-Jewish) views, and supported the Palestine Liberation Organization. He was of Irish descent, and supported the Irish republican cause, opposing the Prevention of Terrorism Act; however, after visiting Northern Ireland in 1994, he came to support the presence of British troops to protect Catholics from loyalist violence. He also opposed the European Community, opposed New Labour, and opposed the wars in Afghanistan and Iraq.

Flannery was chairman of the left-wing Tribune Group of Labour MPs from 1980 to 1981, but left to form the hard left Campaign Group. In 1982, he was one of 32 Labour MPs to vote against the Falklands War, defying the party whip to abstain. He was the far-left candidate for Chief Whip of the Parliamentary Labour party in 1983, but was beaten convincingly by Michael Cocks. He retired at the 1992 general election.

== Other references ==
- The Times Guide to the House of Commons 1987
- Ex-MP Martin Flannery dies at 88 BBC News
- Obituary, The Daily Telegraph, 18 October 2006
- Obituary, The Independent, 18 October 2006
- Leigh Rayment's Historical List of MPs
- Obituary, The Times, 19 October 2006

Parliament of the United Kingdom
| Preceded by George Darling | Member of Parliament for Sheffield Hillsborough; February 1974–1992 | Succeeded by Helen Jackson |
