= Holderness (constituency) =

Parliamentary constituency in the United Kingdom, 1885–1950

- Former county constituency for the House of Commons
- County: East Riding of Yorkshire

1885–1950
- Seats: One
- Created from: East Riding of Yorkshire
- Replaced by: Beverley and Bridlington

Holderness was a parliamentary constituency centred on the Holderness area of the East Riding of Yorkshire. It returned one Member of Parliament (MP) to the House of Commons of the Parliament of the United Kingdom.

The constituency was created for the 1885 general election, and abolished for the 1950 general election.

== Boundaries ==
1885–1918:

1918–1950: The Municipal Boroughs of Beverley and Hedon, the Urban Districts of Cottingham, Hornsea, and Withernsea, the Rural Districts of Patrington and Skirlaugh, part of the Rural District of Beverley, and in the Rural District of Sculcoates the civil parishes of Preston and Sutton.

== Members of Parliament ==
Year	Member	Party
1885	George Bethell	Conservative
1900	Arthur Stanley Wilson	Conservative
1922	Audley Bowdler	Liberal
1923	Sir Samuel Savery	Unionist
1939	Gurney Braithwaite	Conservative
1950	constituency abolished	

== Elections ==
=== Elections in the 1880s ===
Bethell

General election 1885: Holderness
Party	Candidate	Votes	%
Conservative	George Bethell	4,166	54.1
Liberal	Gerard Smith	3,537	45.9
Majority		629	8.2
Turnout		7,703	84.3
Registered electors		9,143	
Conservative win (new seat)			

General election 1886: Holderness
Party	Candidate	Votes	%	±%
Conservative	George Bethell	Unopposed		
Conservative hold				

=== Elections in the 1890s ===
General election 1892: Holderness
Party	Candidate	Votes	%	±%
Conservative	George Bethell	4,158	53.0	N/A
Liberal	James Henry Anderson	3,693	47.0	New
Majority		465	6.0	N/A
Turnout		7,851	81.2	N/A
Registered electors		9,670		
Conservative hold		Swing	N/A	

General election 1895: Holderness
Party	Candidate	Votes	%	±%
Conservative	George Bethell	4,512	56.4	+3.4
Liberal	Bourchier Francis Hawksley	3,483	43.6	−3.4
Majority		1,029	12.8	+6.8
Turnout		7,995	80.6	−0.6
Registered electors		9,920		
Conservative hold		Swing	+3.6	

=== Elections in the 1900s ===
General election 1900: Holderness
Party	Candidate	Votes	%	±%
Conservative	Arthur Stanley Wilson	4,597	62.1	+5.7
Liberal	Allan James Lawrie	2,810	37.9	−5.7
Majority		1,787	24.2	+11.4
Turnout		7,407	76.3	−4.3
Registered electors		9,710		
Conservative hold		Swing	+5.7	

General election 1906: Holderness
Party	Candidate	Votes	%	±%
Conservative	Arthur Stanley Wilson	4,441	50.2	−11.9
Liberal	Ernest J Wilberforce	4,411	49.9	+12.0
Majority		30	0.4	−23.8
Turnout		8,852	87.5	+11.2
Registered electors		10,117		
Conservative hold		Swing	−11.9	

=== Elections in the 1910s ===
General election January 1910: Holderness
Party	Candidate	Votes	%	±%
Conservative	Arthur Stanley Wilson	5,046	52.0	+1.8
Free Trader	George Bethell	4,661	48.0	New
Majority		385	4.0	+3.6
Turnout		9,707	89.5	+2.0
Registered electors		10,850		
Conservative hold		Swing		

Arnold

General election December 1910: Holderness
Party	Candidate	Votes	%	±%
Conservative	Arthur Stanley Wilson	4,861	52.0	±0.0
Liberal	Sydney Arnold	4,480	48.0	New
Majority		381	4.0	±0.0
Turnout		9,341	86.1	−3.4
Registered electors		10,850		
Conservative hold		Swing		

General Election 1914–15:

Another General Election was required to take place before the end of 1915. The political parties had been making preparations for an election to take place and by the July 1914, the following candidates had been selected;

- Unionist: Arthur Stanley Wilson
- Liberal: Fred Maddison

Maddison

General election 1918: Holderness
Party		Candidate	Votes	%	±%
C	Unionist	Arthur Stanley Wilson	9,387	63.0	+11.0
	Liberal	Fred Maddison	5,521	37.0	−11.0
Majority			3,866	26.0	+22.0
Turnout			14,908	57.9	−28.2
Registered electors			25,741		
	Unionist hold		Swing	+11.0	
C indicates candidate endorsed by the coalition government.

=== Election in the 1920s ===
General election 1922: Holderness
Party	Candidate	Votes	%	±%
Liberal	Audley Bowdler	11,479	52.9	+15.9
Unionist	Arthur Stanley Wilson	10,200	47.1	−15.9
Majority		1,279	5.8	N/A
Turnout		21,679	79.1	+21.2
Registered electors		27,421		
Liberal gain from Unionist		Swing	+15.9	

General election 1923: Holderness
Party	Candidate	Votes	%	±%
Unionist	Samuel Savery	11,099	50.6	+3.5
Liberal	Audley Bowdler	10,846	49.4	−3.5
Majority		253	1.2	N/A
Turnout		21,945	78.1	−1.0
Registered electors		28,085		
Unionist gain from Liberal		Swing	+3.5	

General election 1924: Holderness
Party	Candidate	Votes	%	±%
Unionist	Samuel Savery	12,911	56.0	+5.4
Liberal	Neville Dixey	10,162	44.0	−5.4
Majority		2,749	12.0	+10.8
Turnout		23,073	81.1	+3.0
Registered electors		28,449		
Unionist hold		Swing	+5.4	

General election 1929: Holderness
Party	Candidate	Votes	%	±%
Unionist	Samuel Savery	14,544	47.6	−8.4
Liberal	Neville Dixey	13,525	44.3	+0.3
Labour	Joseph William Hewitt	2,481	8.1	New
Majority		1,019	3.3	−8.7
Turnout		30,550	80.1	−1.0
Registered electors		38,147		
Unionist hold		Swing	−4.4	

=== Election in the 1930s ===
General election 1931: Holderness
Party	Candidate	Votes	%	±%
Conservative	Samuel Savery	21,560	61.7	+14.1
Liberal	Aline Mackinnon	10,471	30.0	−14.3
Labour	Joseph Leopold Schultz	2,927	8.4	+0.3
Majority		11,089	31.7	+28.4
Turnout		34,958	81.8	+1.7
Conservative hold		Swing	+14.2	

General election 1935: Holderness
Party	Candidate	Votes	%	±%
Conservative	Samuel Savery	22,249	53.6	−8.1
Liberal	Aline Mackinnon	10,348	24.9	−5.1
Labour	Joseph Leopold Schultz	8,906	21.5	+13.1
Majority		11,901	28.7	−3.0
Turnout		41,503	72.2	−9.6
Conservative hold		Swing	−1.5	

1939 Holderness by-election
Party	Candidate	Votes	%	±%
Conservative	Gurney Braithwaite	17,742	39.4	−14.2
Liberal	Aline Mackinnon	11,590	25.7	+0.8
Labour	Joseph Leopold Schultz	9,629	21.3	−0.2
Independent	Raleigh Chichester-Constable	6,103	13.5	New
Majority		6,152	13.7	−15.0
Turnout		45,064	77.2	+5.0
Conservative hold		Swing	−7.5	

=== Election in the 1940s ===
General election 1945: Holderness
Party	Candidate	Votes	%	±%
Conservative	Gurney Braithwaite	25,181	43.1	+3.7
Labour	Frederick Lawson	23,036	39.5	+18.2
Liberal	Roger Fulford	10,165	17.4	−8.3
Majority		2,145	3.6	−25.1
Turnout		58,382	76.1	−1.1
Conservative hold		Swing		
