= Wyndham Davies =

British politician

Wyndham Roy Davies (3 June 1926 – 4 December 1984) was a British Conservative Party politician. Against the national trend, he was elected member of parliament (MP) for Birmingham Perry Barr at the 1964 general election, gaining the seat from Labour at a time when Labour was coming to power after thirteen years of Conservative rule. However, Davies served for only 17 months, losing his seat to the Labour candidate Christopher Price at the 1966 general election.

He joined the Conservative Monday Club prior to 1966 in which year he edited their booklet Collectivism or Individualism in Medicine. In 1968 he was an ordinary member of the club's executive council, and his address on Social Service Expenditure appeared in the published Proceedings of the Monday Club Conference on Economic Policy for the 1970s, 5 October 1968.

A doctor with a distinguished career in medicine, he was listed in 1982 as a consultant to the pharmaceutical industry.

Parliament of the United Kingdom
Preceded by Charles Howell	Member of Parliament for Birmingham Perry Barr; 1964–1966	Succeeded by Christopher Price
