= Charles Howell (British politician) =

British politician

Validation of Elections (No. 3) Act 1955 (Note: Section 2.)
- Act of Parliament
- Parliament of the United Kingdom
- Long title: An Act to validate the election to the House of Commons of Charles Alfred Howell, Esquire, notwithstanding his holding the office or place of member of certain panels constituted in pursuance of the National Insurance (Industrial Injuries) Act, 1946, and the National Insurance Act, 1946, and to indemnify him from any penal consequences which he may have incurred by sitting and voting as a member of that House.
- Citation: 4 & 5 Eliz. 2. c. 13
- Territorial extent: United Kingdom

Dates
- Royal assent: 22 November 1955
- Commencement: 22 November 1955 (Note: The Acts of Parliament (Commencement) Act 1793.)
- Repealed: 12 May 1969 (Note: The Representation of the People Act 1969 (Commencement) Order 1969 (SI 1969/630).)
Other legislation
Repealed by	Representation of the People Act 1969
Relates to	National Insurance (Industrial Injuries) Act 1946; National Insurance Act 1946

Status: Repealed

Text of statute as originally enacted

Charles Alfred Howell OBE (22 October 1905 – 26 October 1974) was a Labour Party politician in the United Kingdom. He was elected Member of Parliament for Birmingham Perry Barr at the 1955 general election, and served until the 1964 general election when the seat was gained against the national trend by the Conservative candidate Wyndham Davies.

== Bibliography ==
- Leigh Rayment's Historical List of MPs

Parliament of the United Kingdom
Preceded by Cecil Charles Poole	Member of Parliament for Birmingham Perry Barr; 1955–1964	Succeeded by Wyndham Davies
