= Joseph Kinsey (politician) =

Joseph Ronald Kinsey (28 August 1921 – 7 July 1983) was a Conservative politician in the United Kingdom.

Kinsey was a florist. He was a councillor on Birmingham City Council from 1955.

Kinsey first contested Birmingham Aston. He was member of parliament for Birmingham Perry Barr from 1970 until his defeat at the February 1974 general election, when he lost the seat to Labour candidate Jeff Rooker.

Parliament of the United Kingdom
Preceded by Christopher Price	Member of Parliament for Birmingham Perry Barr; 1970–1974	Succeeded by Jeff Rooker
