= Khalid Mahmood (British politician) =

British Labour politician (born 1961)

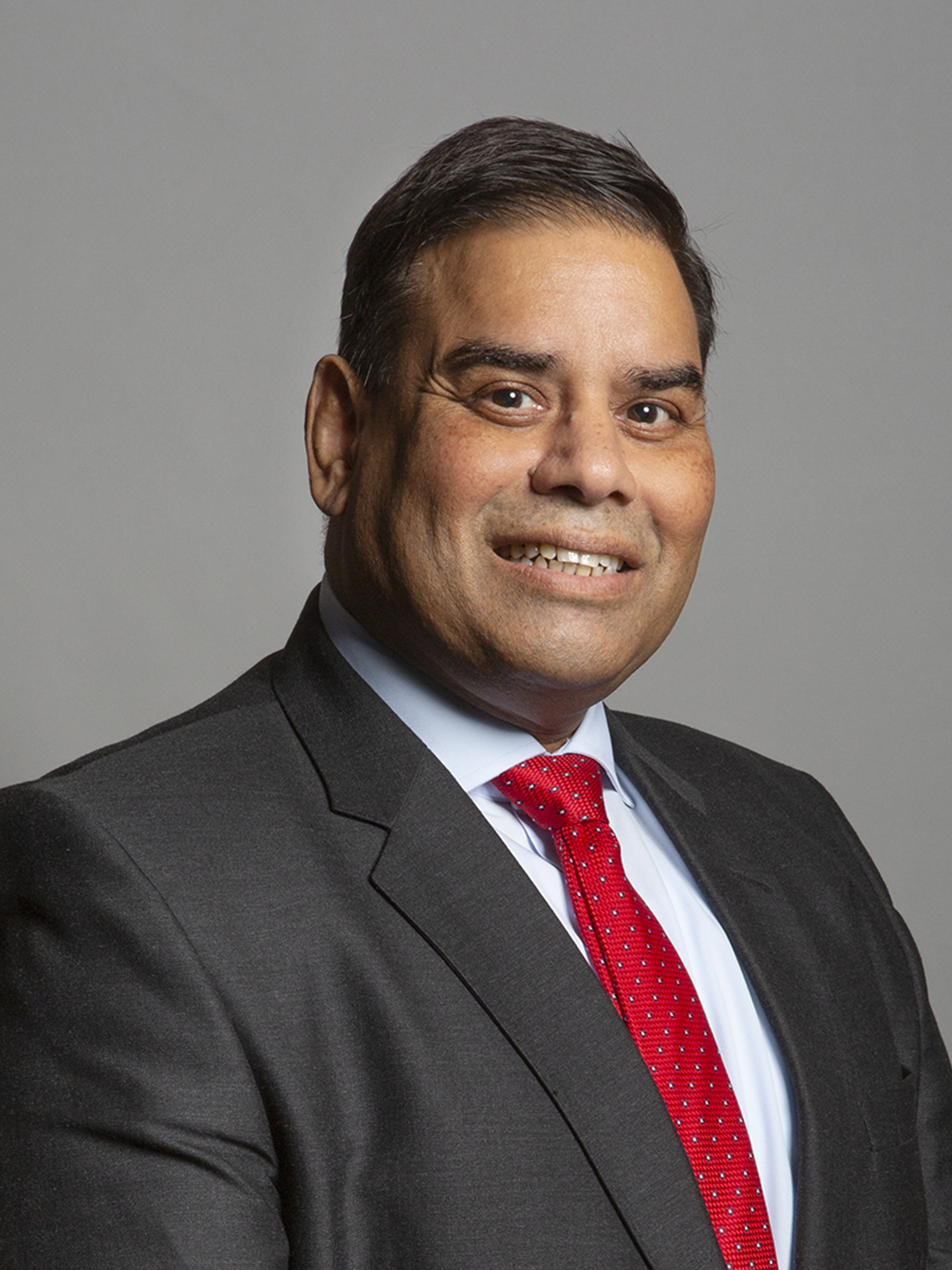
- Official portrait, 2019

Shadow Minister for Defence Procurement
- In office 9 April 2020 – 13 April 2021
- Leader: Keir Starmer
- Preceded by: Stephen Morgan
- Succeeded by: Chris Evans

Shadow Minister for Europe
- In office 6 October 2016 – 9 April 2020
- Leader: Jeremy Corbyn
- Preceded by: Fabian Hamilton
- Succeeded by: Catherine West

Member of Parliament for Birmingham Perry Barr
- In office 7 June 2001 – 30 May 2024
- Preceded by: Jeff Rooker
- Succeeded by: Ayoub Khan

Personal details
- Born: 13 July 1961 (age 65) Azad Kashmir, Pakistan
- Party: Labour
- Education: Birmingham City University (BEng)
- Website: www.khalidmahmoodmp.com

Khalid Mahmood (born 13 July 1961) is a British Labour Party politician who was the Member of Parliament (MP) for Birmingham Perry Barr from 2001 until 2024 when he lost his seat.

He served on the Labour frontbench as a shadow Foreign Office minister under Jeremy Corbyn, and as a shadow Defence minister under Keir Starmer until his resignation in 2021.

== Early life and career ==
Khalid Mahmood was born on 13 July 1961 in Lahore, Punjab. His family moved to Birmingham, England when he was two years old. He studied at UCE Birmingham.

Mahmood is a former engineer with a trade union background. He was a Birmingham City Councillor from 1990 to 1993.

== Political career ==
Mahmood was elected as MP for Birmingham Perry Barr at the 2001 general election with 46.5% of the vote and a majority of 8,753.

In November 2001, an article supportive of the war in Afghanistan was published in The Observer under Mahmood's name, headlined "The Five Myths Muslims Must Deny". A few days later, it was reported that the article had not been written by Mahmood, but by fellow Labour MP Denis MacShane. Mahmood allegedly agreed to put his name to the article after Lord Ahmed of Rotherham refused.

Mahmood did not vote in the 18 March 2003 House of Commons debate on military action against Iraq. In June 2007, he opposed calls for an Iraq inquiry at that time.

He was re-elected as MP for Birmingham Perry Barr at the 2005 general election with an increased vote share of 47% and a decreased majority of 7,948. In November 2005 he was appointed as parliamentary private secretary to Tony McNulty, then a minister in the Home Office. Mahmood resigned as PPS in September 2006 along with several colleagues after signing a letter calling for Tony Blair to resign as prime minister.

In May 2009, it was reported, as part of a series of leaked UK MPs expense details, that Mahmood claimed for £1,350 to stay in a west London hotel with his girlfriend. He also claimed more than £35,000 in expenses for food over eight years.

At the 2010 general election, Mahmood was again re-elected, with an increased vote share of 50.3% and an increased majority of 11,908.

Mahmood opposed the decision by Birmingham Metropolitan College in September 2013 to ban students wearing veils.

In January 2015, he was nominated for the Politician of the Year award at the British Muslim Awards.

At the 2015 general election, Mahmood was again re-elected with an increased vote share of 57.4% and an increased majority of 14,828.

He initially supported Brexit in the 2016 European Union membership referendum, but left the Vote Leave campaign over its rhetoric on immigration.

At the snap 2017 general election, Mahmood was again re-elected with an increased vote share of 68.1% and an increased majority of 18,383.

In May 2019, it was reported by the Birmingham Mail that Mahmood was the most expensive Birmingham MP in 2018, claiming £210,183 in expenses.

At the snap 2019 general election, Mahmood was again re-elected, with a decreased vote share of 63.1% and a decreased majority of 15,317.

In December 2019 he announced that he would stand in the 2020 Labour Party deputy leadership election, but pulled out of the contest in January 2020.

In March 2020, Mahmood defended the anti-racist campaigner Trevor Phillips from claims of Islamophobia, saying that Labour had "lost its way" after it had suspended Phillips. Mahmood said that the move to discipline Phillips had brought "disrepute" on the party.

After Keir Starmer in April 2020 became leader of the Labour Party, Mahmood was appointed as Shadow Minister for Defence Procurement.

Mahmood was a member of a number of All-Party Parliamentary Groups, including the groups for Bahrain, Cyber Security, International Relations, Kuwait, Kyrgyzstan, Sovereign Defence Capability, and Terrorism.

On 13 April 2021, Mahmood resigned from the shadow frontbench, saying that his party had been taken over by "a London-based bourgeoisie, with the support of brigades of woke social media warriors". He later spoke to Spiked about his decision.

Mahmood has always maintained that the Trojan Horse scandal, a conspiracy theory which claimed that Muslims whom he opposed were conspiring to oppose Zionism in British schools, involved genuine fears that non-violent extreme Islamist attitudes had infiltrated various Birmingham schools. He contributed an introduction to this effect in the Policy Exchange report into the topic published in December 2022.

In June 2024, Mahmood was reselected as the Labour candidate for Birmingham Perry Barr at the 2024 general election. He was defeated by independent candidate Ayoub Khan.

Mahmood is a member of Unite the Union.

== Personal life ==
=== Kidney failure ===
In January 2014, Mahmood underwent a kidney transplant at the Queen Elizabeth Hospital in Edgbaston, Birmingham, receiving an organ from a donor later revealed to be the Labour politician Siôn Simon. He had been on dialysis, following kidney failure in 2008. His twin brother had previously died from kidney failure.

=== Liaison ===
In August 2018, it was reported that Mahmood became involved in an employment tribunal over alleged religious discrimination brought about by his parliamentary assistant, Elaina Cohen, who is Jewish and with whom he was formerly in a 17-year relationship. It emerged that the costs of the legal battle were covered by a Parliamentary expenses system, which was ultimately funded by the taxpayer. The total cost to the taxpayer was reported to be almost £40,000. In August 2022, Mahmood lost the claim against Cohen, with the court finding that she was unfairly dismissed and 'isolated' by her boss after raising concerns about alleged criminal actions by a colleague. The panel also ruled she had suffered detriment as a result of making a 'protected disclosure' in that she was 'marginalised and isolated in the period January 2020 until her dismissal'.

=== Vaccination ===
It was reported that, despite being in Tier 4 of the Government's priority list for the UK's COVID-19 vaccination, Mahmood was vaccinated in December 2020 at the Queen Elizabeth Hospital in Birmingham, contrary to calls from National Health Service management that the public would be turned away without an appointment. He pointed out:

at the end of the day any vaccine unused because people have not turned up for their appointments is made available at the QE vaccination hub – we can’t afford to waste any vaccine doses.

Parliament of the United Kingdom
Preceded by Jeff Rooker	Member of Parliament for Birmingham Perry Barr; 2001–2024	Succeeded by Ayoub Khan
Political offices
Preceded by Fabian Hamilton	Shadow Minister of State for Europe; 2016–2020	Succeeded by Catherine West
Preceded by Stephen Morgan	Shadow Minister for Defence Procurement; 2020–2021	Succeeded by Chris Evans
