= Audley Bowdler =

Audley Bowdler

William Audley Bowdler (7 September 1884 – 20 February 1969) was a Liberal Party politician in England who served briefly as a Member of Parliament (MP) in the early 1920s.

== Background ==
He was born in Kirkham, Lancashire, the son of W. H. Bowdler and E. A. Richards, of Clifton, Lancashire. He was educated at Rossall School. In 1918 he married Marguerite Parkes, of Woldingham. They had one son and three daughters.

== Political career ==
He started his parliamentary career in March 1922 when he was selected as the Liberal prospective parliamentary candidate for the Holderness division of East Yorkshire. As a Lancastrian, he was an outsider to the constituency not expected to defeat the sitting Unionist MP Arthur Wilson who had held the seat for 22 years. During the 1922 general election campaign held in November, The Times were happy to write off his prospects of victory; "The Conservatives hold on Holderness is not believed to be seriously endangered. The farmers may be cross, but many of them have voted Conservative all their lives, and will not easily break with their political traditions." His victory, on a swing of 16% was therefore a surprise;

1922 United Kingdom general election: Holderness Electorate 27,421
Party	Candidate	Votes	%	±%
Liberal	William Audley Bowdler	11,479	52.9	+15.9
Conservative	Arthur Stanley Wilson	10,200	47.1	−15.9
Majority		1,279	5.8	31.8
Turnout			79.1	+21.2

Another General Election came around a year later and despite the Liberal Party experiencing something of a revival, Bowdler lost his seat in the House of Commons at the 1923 general election, to a new Conservative candidate Samuel Savery,

1923 United Kingdom general election: Holderness Electorate 28,085
Party	Candidate	Votes	%	±%
Conservative	Samuel Servington Savery	11,099	50.6	+3.5
Liberal	William Audley Bowdler	10,846	49.4	−3.5
Majority		253	1.2	7.0
Turnout			78.1	

He did not stand again.

Parliament of the United Kingdom
Preceded by Arthur Wilson	Member of Parliament for Holderness; 1922–1923	Succeeded by Samuel Savery
