= Jeff Rooker =

British Labour politician, life peer (born 1941)

The Right Honourable The Lord Rooker PC
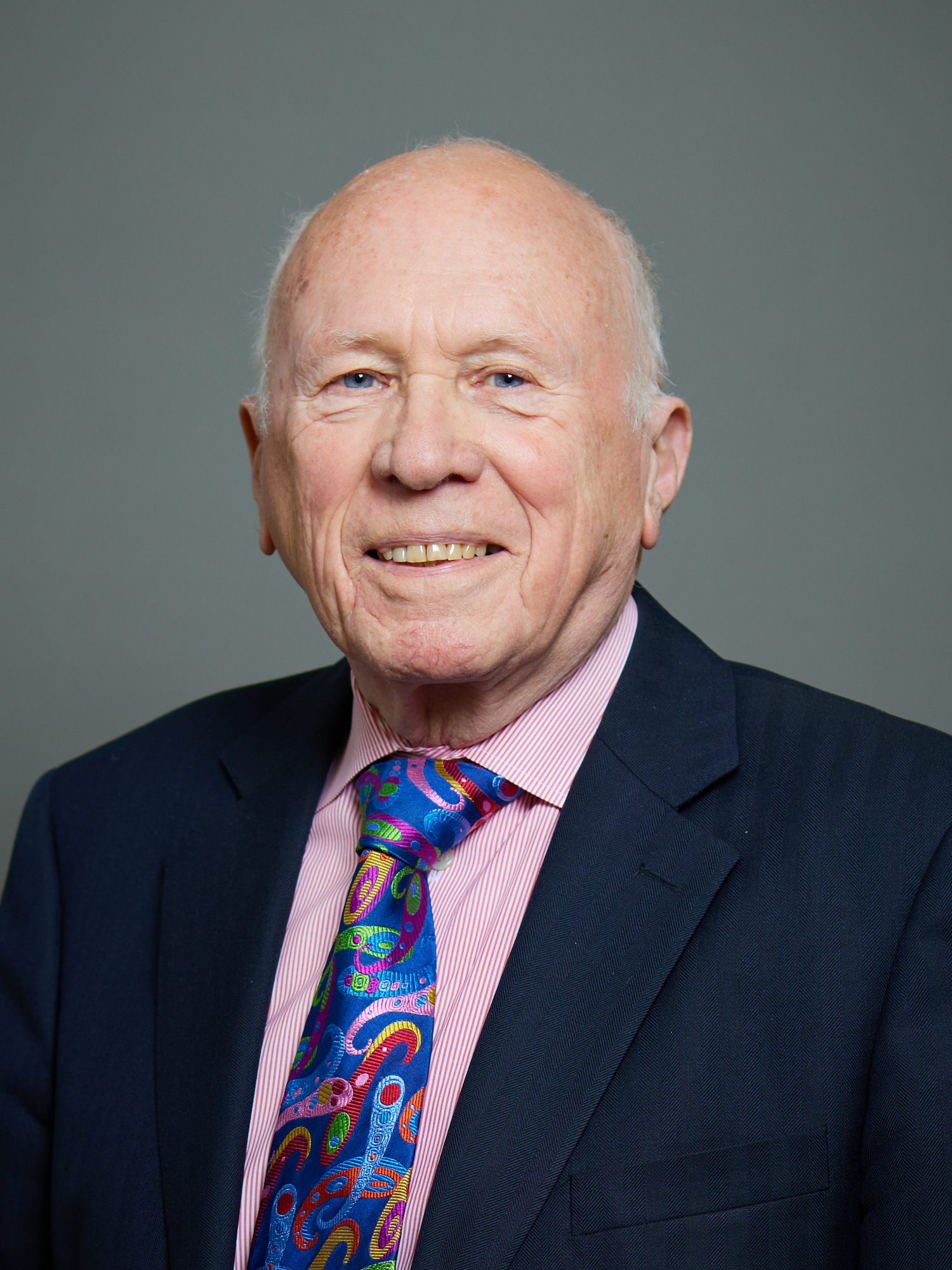
- Official portrait, 2022

Deputy Leader of the House of Lords
- In office 1 June 2005 – 5 October 2008
- Prime Minister: Tony Blair; Gordon Brown
- Leader: The Baroness Amos; The Baroness Ashton of Upholland
- Preceded by: The Baroness Symons of Vernham Dean
- Succeeded by: The Lord Hunt of Kings Heath
Junior ministerial offices 1997–2008
Minister of State for Sustainable Food, Farming and Animal Health
In office 6 May 2006 – 3 October 2008
Prime Minister	Tony Blair; Gordon Brown
Preceded by	The Lord Bach
Succeeded by	Jane Kennedy
Minister of State for Children in Northern Ireland
In office 9 May 2005 – 6 May 2006
Prime Minister	Tony Blair
Preceded by	Barry Gardiner
Succeeded by	Maria Eagle
Minister of State for Regeneration and Regional Development
In office 13 June 2003 – 9 May 2005
Prime Minister	Tony Blair
Preceded by	Position established
Succeeded by	Yvette Cooper
Minister of State for Housing and Planning
In office 29 May 2002 – 13 June 2003
Prime Minister	Tony Blair
Preceded by	The Lord Falconer of Thoroton
Succeeded by	Keith Hill
Minister of State for Asylum and Immigration
In office 11 June 2001 – 29 May 2002
Prime Minister	Tony Blair
Preceded by	Barbara Roche
Succeeded by	Beverley Hughes
Minister of State for Pensions
In office 29 July 1999 – 7 June 2001
Prime Minister	Tony Blair
Preceded by	Stephen Timms
Succeeded by	Ian McCartney
Minister of State for Agriculture, Fisheries and Food
In office 6 May 1997 – 29 July 1999
Prime Minister	Tony Blair
Preceded by	Tony Baldry
Succeeded by	Joyce Quin
Further offices held
Chair of the Food Standards Agency
In office July 2009 – July 2013
Appointed by	Hilary Benn
Preceded by	Dame Deirdre Hutton
Succeeded by	Heather Hancock
Member of the House of Lords
Lord Temporal
Life peerage 16 June 2001
Member of Parliament for Birmingham Perry Barr
In office 28 February 1974 – 14 May 2001
Preceded by	Joseph Kinsey
Succeeded by	Khalid Mahmood

Personal details
- Born: Jeffrey William Rooker; 5 July 1941 (age 85)
- Party: Labour (since 2013; before 2009); Independent (2009–2013)
- Education: Aston University

Jeffrey William Rooker, Baron Rooker PC (born 5 June 1941) is a British politician and life peer who served as a government minister from 1997 to 2008. A member of the Labour Party, he was Member of Parliament (MP) for Birmingham Perry Barr from 1974 to 2001.

Raised and educated in Birmingham, Rooker worked as a production engineer in the city before lecturing in the subject at Lanchester Polytechnic. He studied at Aston University and the University of Warwick; and he eventually gained a postgraduate degree in industrial relations. After an unsuccessful campaign to join the Birmingham City Council in 1966, he was elected to the House of Commons at the February 1974 general election and joined the government after the Labour victory at the 1997 general election as Minister of State at the Ministry of Agriculture, Fisheries and Food.

Rooker did not seek re-election as an MP at the 2001 general election and was immediately created a life peer where he continued to serve in the government under several ministerial portfolios until 2008, including as Deputy Leader of the House of Lords and Minister of State for Sustainable Food, Farming and Animal Health from 2005 to 2008. He resigned the Labour whip in 2009 after being appointed chair of the Food Standards Agency. He sat as an independent member in the House of Lords until 2013 when, standing down as chair of the FSA, he took up the Labour whip once again.

== Early life and career ==
The son of a factory worker, Jeff Rooker attended Aldridge Road Secondary Modern Boys School, Aldridge Road, Great Barr. He later attended Handsworth Technical School and College, Goldshill Road, Handsworth. He initially trained as a production engineer, working in various factories in and around Birmingham for 14 years and then became a lecturer on the subject at Lanchester Polytechnic.

Rooker graduated with an undergraduate degree from Aston University in the city of Birmingham and he served as editor of the Birmingham Student Union News (SUN) from 1963 to 1964. He later received a postgraduate degree from the University of Warwick in industrial relations. In 1966, he was an unsuccessful candidate for membership of Birmingham City Council.

== Early parliamentary career ==
Rooker was selected as the prospective parliamentary candidate in October 1971 for his home constituency of Birmingham Perry Barr, which he won in the February 1974 general election.

Rooker achieved a measure of national prominence in June 1977 while still a backbencher. With fellow MP Audrey Wise, he introduced the so-called Rooker–Wise Amendment to the Budget. This linked personal tax allowances to the rate of inflation, thereby preventing the erosion of non-taxable income. The BBC has described the amendment as "a rare example of direct backbench influence on the Budget".

Beginning in 1998, Rooker led an unsuccessful attempt to prosecute World War II German general Wilhelm Mohnke for his alleged role in war crimes inflicted on British troops at Wormhoudt in 1940.

== Ministerial career ==
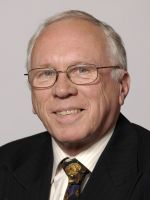
Rooker as a government minister

After Tony Blair led Labour to power in the 1997 general election, Rooker served as Minister of State for Agriculture, Fisheries and Food. In July 1999, he was moved to the Department of Social Security where he served as Minister of State for Pensions. He was made a Privy Counsellor in 1999.

Rooker did not seek re-election as an MP at the 2001 general election and was created a life peer on 16 June 2001 with the title Baron Rooker, of Perry Barr in the County of West Midlands. As a member of the House of Lords, he was re-appointed to the government as the Minister of State for Asylum and Immigration and remained in the post for a year. He then was moved to the Department for Communities and Local Government, where he served as Minister of State for Housing and Planning, then subsequently Minister of State for Regeneration and Regional Development.

Following the 2005 general election, Rooker was named the Minister of State at the Northern Ireland Office, with responsibility for children in Northern Ireland.

On 6 May 2006, Rooker was appointed Minister of State for Sustainable Food, Farming and Animal Health at the Department for Environment, Food and Rural Affairs. He was a controversial choice as minister responsible for animal welfare due to his well-known pro-hunting views. In 2007, following Rooker's appointment, numerous complaints from animal welfare campaigners were sent to the Labour Party. He later also became deputy leader of the House of Lords. He retained both these roles when Gordon Brown became Labour leader and Prime Minister in 2007 and showed himself to be outspokenly in favour of genetically modified (GM) foods at the September 2008 Labour Party Conference, when he accused people opposed to GM foods of "ignorance". Rooker's ministerial appointed ended at a reshuffle in October 2008.

== Later career ==
Rooker is a vice president of The Birmingham Civic Society. As of January 2008, he is a lay governor of Aston University. In July 2009, he was appointed as chair of the Food Standards Agency and resigned the Labour party whip for the duration until he ceased to be chair in 2013.

In December 2015, Rooker called for Jeremy Corbyn to be removed as Labour Party leader before 2020.

Rooker is a member of Labour Friends of Israel.

== Personal life ==
Rooker married Angela Edwards in 1972 in Paddington, London, who died in January 2003; he married second wife Helen Hughes on 5 February 2010 in a private ceremony in Christchurch, New Zealand. In 2001, he was awarded an honorary doctorate from Aston University of which he is an alumnus.

Parliament of the United Kingdom
Preceded by Joseph Kinsey	Member of Parliament for Birmingham Perry Barr; Feb 1974–2001	Succeeded by Khalid Mahmood
Political offices
Preceded by The Lord Falconer of Thoroton	Minister of State for Housing and Planning; 2002–2003	Succeeded by Keith Hill
Preceded by The Baroness Symons of Vernham Dean	Deputy Leader of the House of Lords; 2005–2008	Succeeded by The Lord Hunt of Kings Heath
Orders of precedence in the United Kingdom
Preceded by The Lord Best	Gentlemen; Baron Rooker	Followed by The Lord Hannay of Chiswick
