= Percy Graham MacKinnon =

Sir Percy Graham MacKinnon (6 October 1872 – 21 November 1956) was a British businessman who served as chairman of Lloyd's of London.

MacKinnon was born in Highgate, London, the second son of seven children of Benjamin Thomas, a Lloyd's underwriter and Katherine née Edwards. After his education at Highgate School he followed his father into Lloyd's, and became chairman no less than five times. He was chairman in 1925 when the foundation stone was laid to the previous Lloyd's Building, which was later officially opened by King George V.

MacKinnon was knighted In the 1928 Birthday Honours.

Later MacKinnon was also on the board of directors of British Airways Limited,

MacKinnon married Mabel Lockett in 1896 in Hornsey, Edmonton, Middlesex, England. They had three daughters, Jean, Aline, and Margaret, and a son, Graham.

MacKinnon's older brother, Sir Frank MacKinnon was an English lawyer, judge and writer, the only High Court judge to be appointed during the First Labour Government.

He died at his home in Crockham Hill, Kent, aged 84.
