= Birmingham Perry Barr =

Parliamentary constituency in the United Kingdom, 1950 onwards

Coordinates: 52.52°N 1.91°W

- Borough constituency for the House of Commons
- Boundaries since 2024
- Boundary of Birmingham Perry Barr in West Midlands region
- County: West Midlands
- Population: 107,090 (2011 census)
- Electorate: 74,048 (2023)
- Major settlements: Handsworth and Perry Barr

Current constituency
- Created: 1950
- Member of Parliament: Ayoub Khan (Independent)
- Seats: One
- Created from: Birmingham Handsworth

Birmingham Perry Barr is a constituency (Note: A borough constituency (for the purposes of election expenses and type of returning officer)) in the West Midlands, represented in the House of Commons of the UK Parliament by independent Ayoub Khan since July 2024. It had previously been held since 2001 by Khalid Mahmood of the Labour Party. (Note: As with all constituencies, the constituency elects one Member of Parliament (MP) by the first past the post system of election at least every five years.)

== Constituency profile ==
The constituency is located in Birmingham and covers the area to the north of the city centre. It is predominantly urban and contains the neighbourhoods of Handsworth, Aston and Perry Barr and stretches north to include parts of Kingstanding.

The northern parts of the constituency around Old Oscott are suburban, whilst Handsworth and Lozells are inner-city in character and have a history of civil unrest. The constituency is ethnically diverse; Asians make up a majority of the population (53%)—which includes a significant Sikh community (10%)—White people make up 21% of the population and Black people are 17%. The White population reaches up to 80% in the northern areas of the constituency.

Residents of the constituency have high levels of deprivation and low levels of income, education and professional employment compared to national averages. The vote was split at the most recent city council election in 2026: 3 councillors were elected from each of the Labour Party, Liberal Democrats and Independent, and one councillor was elected from the Green Party. Most voters (55%) supported remaining in the European Union in the 2016 referendum, higher than the national figure of 48%.

== Boundaries ==
The constituency covers a broad area of north-west Birmingham.

1950–1974: The County Borough of Birmingham wards of Kingstanding and Perry Barr.

1974–1983: The County Borough of Birmingham wards of Kingstanding, Oscott, and Perry Barr.

1983–1997: The City of Birmingham wards of Handsworth, Kingstanding, Oscott, and Perry Barr.

1997–2010: The City of Birmingham wards of Handsworth, Oscott, Perry Barr, and Sandwell.

2010–2018: The City of Birmingham wards of Handsworth Wood, Lozells and East Handsworth, Oscott, and Perry Barr.

2018–2024: Following a local government boundary review, which did not affect the parliamentary boundaries, the contents of the constituency were as follows with effect from May 2018:

- The City of Birmingham wards of Birchfield, Handsworth, Handsworth Wood, Oscott, and Perry Barr, most of Lozells, a majority of Holyhead, and small parts of Aston and Kingstanding.

2024–present: Further to the 2023 review of Westminster constituencies which came into effect for the 2024 general election, the constituency comprises:

- The City of Birmingham wards of: Aston; Birchfield; Handsworth; Handsworth Wood; Holyhead; Lozells; Oscott (part); Perry Barr.

The bulk of the Aston ward and the remainder of the Holyhead and Lozells wards were transferred from Birmingham Ladywood, partly offset by the loss to Birmingham Erdington of the majority of the Oscott ward and the part of the Kingstanding ward.

== Members of Parliament ==
Election	Member	Party
1950	Cecil Poole	Labour
1955	Charles Howell	Labour
1964	Wyndham Davies	Conservative
1966	Christopher Price	Labour
1970	Joseph Kinsey	Conservative
Feb 1974	Jeff Rooker	Labour
2001	Khalid Mahmood	Labour
2024	Ayoub Khan	Independent

== Elections ==
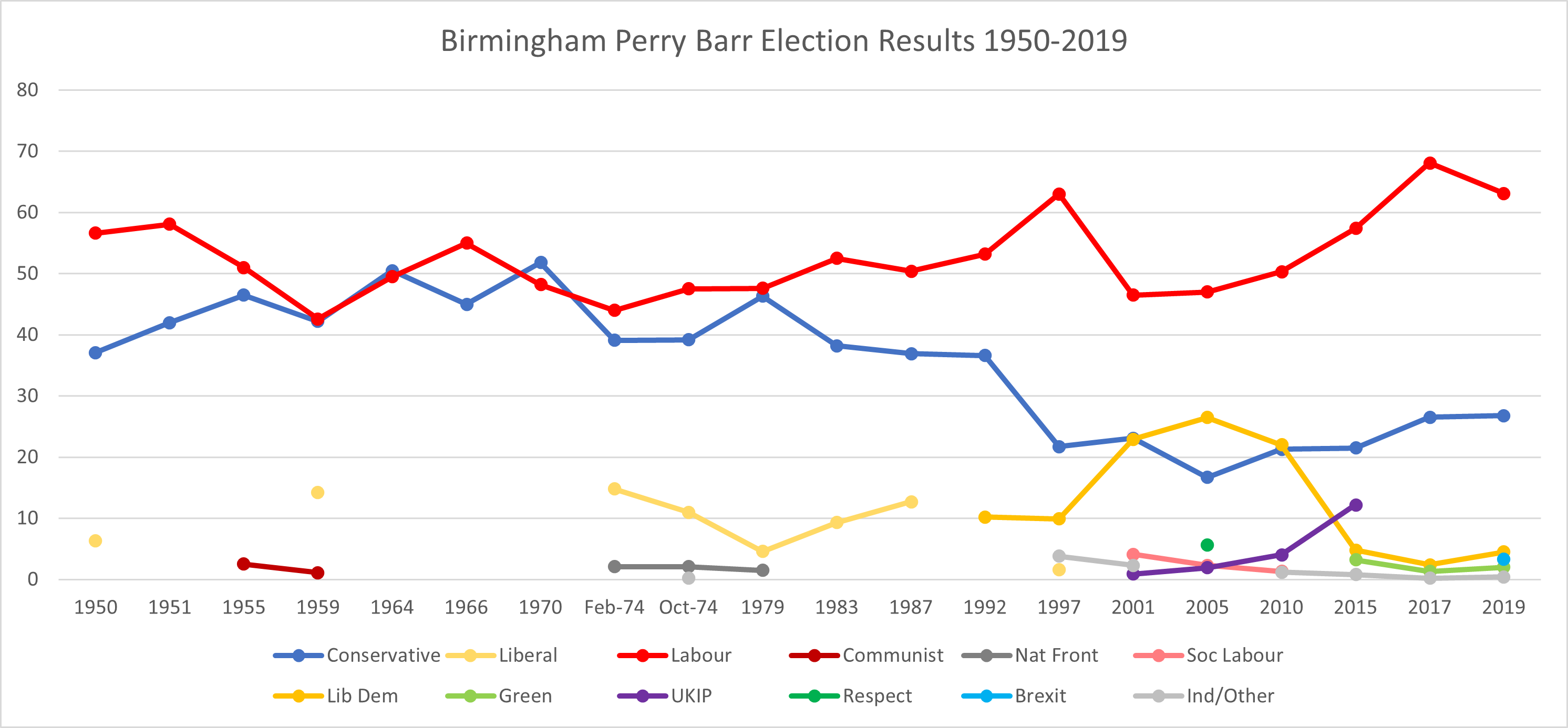

=== Elections in the 2020s ===
General election 2024: Birmingham Perry Barr
Party	Candidate	Votes	%	±%
Independent	Ayoub Khan	13,303	35.5	new
Labour	Khalid Mahmood	12,796	34.1	▼29.0
Conservative	Garry Hickton	4,227	11.3	▼15.5
Reform	Akshay Khuttan	2,446	6.5	▲3.2
Green	Kefentse Dennis	2,440	6.5	▲4.5
Liberal Democrats	Sabah Hamed	1,302	3.5	▼1.0
Independent	Niko Omilana (Note: Eleven constituencies had candidates by the name Niko Omilana. The YouTuber Niko Omilana stood in the Richmond and Northallerton constituency. Ajose, Daniel (28 June 2024). "YouTuber Niko 'got people to legally change their name' to appear on ballot in 11 constituencies". ITV News.)	509	1.4	new
Socialist Labour	Shangara Singh	453	1.2	new
Majority		507	1.4	
Turnout		37,476	49.1	▼14.3
Registered electors		76,350		
Independent gain from Labour		Swing	▲34.7	

=== Elections in the 2010s ===
General election 2019: Birmingham Perry Barr
Party	Candidate	Votes	%	±%
Labour	Khalid Mahmood	26,594	63.1	▼5.0
Conservative	Raaj Shamji	11,277	26.8	▲0.3
Liberal Democrats	Gerry Jerome	1,901	4.5	▲2.1
Brexit Party	Annette Willcox	1,382	3.3	New
Green	Kefentse Dennis	845	2.0	▲0.7
Yeshua	Thomas Braich	148	0.4	New
Majority		15,317	36.3	▼5.3
Turnout		42,147	58.7	▼4.4
Labour hold		Swing		

General election 2017: Birmingham Perry Barr
Party	Candidate	Votes	%	±%
Labour	Khalid Mahmood	30,109	68.1	▲10.7
Conservative	Charlotte Hodivala	11,726	26.5	▲5.0
Liberal Democrats	Harjun Singh	1,080	2.4	▼2.4
Socialist Labour	Shangara Bhatoe	592	1.3	New
Green	Vijay Rana	591	1.3	▼1.9
Open Borders	Harjinder Singh	99	0.2	New
Majority		18,383	41.6	▲5.7
Turnout		44,197	63.1	▲4.1
Labour hold		Swing	▲2.85	

General election 2015: Birmingham Perry Barr
Party	Candidate	Votes	%	±%
Labour	Khalid Mahmood	23,697	57.4	▲7.1
Conservative	Charlotte Hodivala	8,869	21.5	▲0.2
UKIP	Harjinder Singh	5,032	12.2	▲8.2
Liberal Democrats	Harjun Singh	2,001	4.8	▼17.2
Green	James Lovatt	1,330	3.2	New
TUSC	Robert Punton	331	0.8	New
Majority		14,828	35.9	▲7.6
Turnout		41,260	59.0	0.0
Labour hold		Swing	▲2.0	

General election 2010: Birmingham Perry Barr
Party	Candidate	Votes	%	±%
Labour	Khalid Mahmood	21,142	50.3	▲4.0
Liberal Democrats	Karen Hamilton	9,234	22.0	▼4.2
Conservative	William Norton	8,960	21.3	▲4.0
UKIP	Melvin J. Ward	1,675	4.0	▲1.6
Socialist Labour	John Tyrrell	527	1.3	▼1.0
Christian	Deborah Hey-Smith	507	1.2	New
Majority		11,908	28.3	▲8.2
Turnout		42,045	59.0	▲5.1
Labour hold		Swing	▲4.1	

=== Elections in the 2000s ===
General election 2005: Birmingham Perry Barr
Party	Candidate	Votes	%	±%
Labour	Khalid Mahmood	18,269	47.0	▲0.5
Liberal Democrats	Jonathan Hunt	10,321	26.5	▲3.6
Conservative	Naweed Khan	6,513	16.7	▼6.4
Respect	Mohammad Naseem	2,173	5.6	New
Socialist Labour	Rajinder Clair	890	2.3	▼1.8
UKIP	Bimla Balu	745	1.9	▲1.0
Majority		7,948	20.5	▼2.9
Turnout		38,911	55.5	▲2.9
Labour hold		Swing	▼1.6	

General election 2001: Birmingham Perry Barr
Party	Candidate	Votes	%	±%
Labour	Khalid Mahmood	17,415	46.5	▼16.5
Conservative	David Binns	8,662	23.1	▲1.4
Liberal Democrats	Jonathan Hunt	8,566	22.9	▲13.0
Socialist Labour	Avtar Singh Jouhl	1,544	4.1	New
Socialist Alliance	Caroline Johnson	465	1.2	New
UKIP	Natalya Nattrass	352	0.9	New
Marxist Party	Michael Roche	221	0.6	New
Muslim Party	Robert Davidson	192	0.5	New
Majority		8,753	23.4	▼17.9
Turnout		37,417	52.6	▼11.9
Labour hold		Swing	▼9.0	

=== Elections in the 1990s ===
General election 1997: Birmingham Perry Barr
Party	Candidate	Votes	%	±%
Labour	Jeff Rooker	28,921	63.0	▲12.8
Conservative	Andrew Dunnett	9,964	21.7	▼14.9
Liberal Democrats	Raymond Hassall	4,523	9.9	▼0.3
Referendum	Saeed Mahmood	843	1.8	New
Liberal	William Baxter	718	1.6	New
BNP	Lee Windridge	544	1.2	New
Independent	Avtar Singh Panesar	374	0.8	New
Majority		18,957	41.3	▲24.7
Turnout		45,887	64.5	▼7.1
Labour hold		Swing	▲13.9	

General election 1992: Birmingham Perry Barr
Party	Candidate	Votes	%	±%
Labour	Jeff Rooker	27,507	53.2	▲2.8
Conservative	Graham Green	18,917	36.6	▼0.3
Liberal Democrats	Toby Philpott	5,261	10.2	▼2.5
Majority		8,590	16.6	▲3.1
Turnout		51,685	71.6	▲2.0
Labour hold		Swing	▲1.6	

=== Elections in the 1980s ===
General election 1987: Birmingham Perry Barr
Party	Candidate	Votes	%	±%
Labour	Jeff Rooker	25,894	50.4	▼2.1
Conservative	John Taylor	18,961	36.9	▼1.3
Liberal	David Webb	6,514	12.7	▲3.4
Majority		6,933	13.5	▼0.8
Turnout		51,369	69.6	▲0.4
Labour hold		Swing	▼0.4	

General election 1983: Birmingham Perry Barr
Party	Candidate	Votes	%	±%
Labour	Jeff Rooker	27,061	52.5	▲4.9
Conservative	Michael Portillo	19,659	38.2	▼8.1
Liberal	Cecil Gus-Williams	4,773	9.3	▲4.7
Majority		7,402	14.3	▲3.0
Turnout		51,493	69.2	▼6.6
Labour hold		Swing	▲6.5	

=== Elections in the 1970s ===
General election 1979: Birmingham Perry Barr
Party	Candidate	Votes	%	±%
Labour	Jeff Rooker	18,674	47.6	▲0.1
Conservative	Joseph Kinsey	18,183	46.3	▲7.1
Liberal	Olive Griffiths	1,811	4.6	▼6.4
National Front	Keith Axon	582	1.5	▼0.6
Majority		491	1.3	▼7.0
Turnout		39,250	75.8	▲2.4
Labour hold		Swing	▼3.5	

General election October 1974: Birmingham Perry Barr
Party	Candidate	Votes	%	±%
Labour	Jeff Rooker	18,291	47.5	▲3.5
Conservative	Joseph Kinsey	15,087	39.2	▲0.1
Liberal	Kenneth Hovers	4,231	11.0	▼3.8
National Front	Ralph Warren	826	2.1	0.0
More Prosperous Britain	Thomas Keen	86	0.2	New
Majority		3,204	8.3	▲3.4
Turnout		38,521	73.4	▼4.9
Labour hold		Swing	▲1.7	

General election February 1974: Birmingham Perry Barr
Party	Candidate	Votes	%	±%
Labour	Jeff Rooker	17,960	44.0	▼4.2
Conservative	Joseph Kinsey	15,937	39.1	▼12.7
Liberal	Kenneth Hovers	6,044	14.8	New
National Front	Arthur Shorthouse	853	2.1	New
Majority		2,023	4.9	N/A
Turnout		40,794	78.3	▲7.7
Labour gain from Conservative		Swing	▲4.3	

General election 1970: Birmingham Perry Barr
Party	Candidate	Votes	%	±%
Conservative	Joseph Kinsey	18,083	51.8	▲6.8
Labour	Christopher Price	16,817	48.2	▼6.8
Majority		1,266	3.6	N/A
Turnout		34,900	70.6	▼5.6
Conservative gain from Labour		Swing	▲6.8	

=== Elections in the 1960s ===
General election 1966: Birmingham Perry Barr
Party	Candidate	Votes	%	±%
Labour	Christopher Price	20,222	55.0	▲5.5
Conservative	Wyndham Davies	16,557	45.0	▼4.5
Majority		3,665	10.0	N/A
Turnout		36,779	76.2	▲1.3
Labour gain from Conservative		Swing	▲5.5	

General election 1964: Birmingham Perry Barr
Party	Candidate	Votes	%	±%
Conservative	Wyndham Davies	18,483	50.5	▲8.3
Labour	Charles Howell	18,156	49.5	▲6.9
Majority		327	1.0	N/A
Turnout		36,639	74.9	▼3.6
Conservative gain from Labour		Swing	▲0.7	

=== Elections in the 1950s ===
General election 1959: Birmingham Perry Barr
Party	Candidate	Votes	%	±%
Labour	Charles Howell	16,811	42.6	▼8.4
Conservative	Stanley C Greatrix	16,628	42.2	▼4.3
Liberal	Wallace Lawler	5,611	14.2	New
Communist	Bert Pearce	424	1.1	▼1.4
Majority		183	0.4	▼4.1
Turnout		39,474	78.5	▲5.7
Labour hold		Swing	▼2.1	

General election 1955: Birmingham Perry Barr
Party	Candidate	Votes	%	±%
Labour	Charles Howell	18,732	51.0	▼7.1
Conservative	Frederick B Hingston	17,052	46.5	▲4.5
Communist	Bert Pearce	928	2.5	New
Majority		1,680	4.5	▼11.6
Turnout		36,712	72.8	▼8.3
Labour hold		Swing	▼5.8	

General election 1951: Birmingham Perry Barr
Party	Candidate	Votes	%	±%
Labour	Cecil Poole	23,322	58.1	▲1.5
Conservative	Sarah Ward	16,855	42.0	▲4.9
Majority		6,467	16.1	▼3.6
Turnout		40,177	81.1	▼1.9
Labour hold		Swing	▼1.7	

General election 1950: Birmingham Perry Barr
Party	Candidate	Votes	%	±%
Labour	Cecil Poole	23,178	56.6	
Conservative	Edward Boyle	15,172	37.1	
Liberal	Frances Nora Hinks	2,581	6.3	
Majority		8,006	19.5	
Turnout		40,931	83.0	
Labour win (new seat)				

== See also ==
- parliamentary constituencies in the West Midlands (county)
- List of parliamentary constituencies in West Midlands (region)
