= Arthur Lockwood (cricketer) =

English cricketer

Personal information
- Full name: Arthur Leslie Lockwood
- Born: 1 April 1903; Romiley, Cheshire, England
- Died: 8 November 1933 (aged 30); Llandudno, Caernarvonshire, Wales
- Batting: Right-handed
- Bowling: Right-arm fast-medium

Domestic team information
- Years: Team
- 1930–1933: Denbighshire
- 1926: Wales

Career statistics
Competition	First-class
Matches	1
Runs scored	5
Batting average	5.00
100s/50s	–/–
Top score	5
Balls bowled	120
Wickets	1
Bowling average	84.00
5 wickets in innings	–
10 wickets in match	–
Best bowling	1/34
Catches/stumpings	1/–
- Source: Cricinfo, 24 August 2011

Arthur Leslie Lockwood (1 April 1903 – 8 November 1933) was an English cricketer. Lockwood was a right-handed batsman who bowled right-arm fast-medium. He was born in Romiley, Cheshire.

Lockwood made his only first-class appearance for Wales against Ireland in 1926. In this match, he conceded 50 runs from the 7 overs he bowled in the Irish first-innings, going wicket-less. In their second-innings, he claimed the wicket of Louis Bookman for the cost of 34 runs from 13 overs. With the bat, he was dismissed for 5 in Wales only innings by Gustavus Kelly. Lockwood later made his debut for Denbighshire in the 1930 Minor Counties Championship against Cheshire. He made a further five Minor Counties Championship appearances for the county, the last of which came against Lincolnshire in 1933.

He died in Llandudno, Caernarvonshire on 8 November 1933, aged 30.
