= Gurney Braithwaite =

British politician (1895-1958)

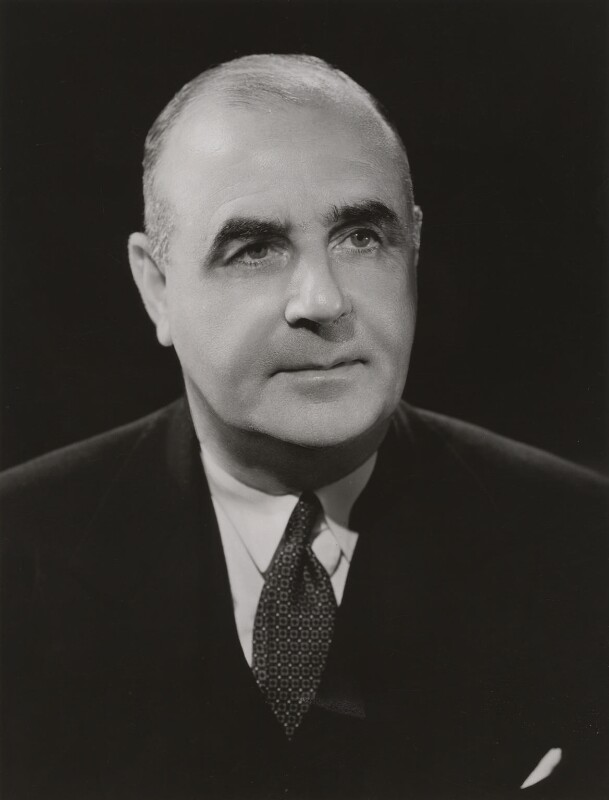
Braithwaite in 1946

Sir Joseph Gurney Braithwaite, 1st Baronet (24 May 1895 – 25 June 1958) was an English Conservative Party politician.

Gurney Braithwaite came from a Quaker family, the youngest son of Joseph Bevan Braithwaite (stockbroker). He was educated at Downs School, Colwall and Bootham School , York. During World War I, he served in the Royal Navy at the Suvla Bay landing, Gallipoli, and in Palestine. He became a stockbroker and company director.

Braithwaite contested Rotherhithe without success in 1929, and was elected the member of parliament (MP) for Sheffield Hillsborough at the 1931 general election, losing the seat in 1935 to the previous incumbent, A. V. Alexander. He re-entered Parliament in a 1939 by-election for Holderness. In Parliament, he was active on issues relating to ex-servicemen and the Navy, and was himself a lieutenant-commander in the RNVR. During World War II he helped organise convoys in the Thames area.

At the 1950 general election, Braithwaite's Holderness seat was abolished and he was elected for the marginal Bristol North West constituency. He served as Parliamentary Secretary to the Minister of Transport in the government of Winston Churchill from 1951 to 1953. He was made a baronet on 28 January 1954. Boundary changes involved his seat being redrawn to Labour's advantage, and at the 1955 general election Braithwaite lost. He died three years later, aged 63.

Parliament of the United Kingdom
Preceded by A. V. Alexander	Member of Parliament for Sheffield Hillsborough; 1931–1935	Succeeded by A. V. Alexander
Preceded by Samuel Savery	Member of Parliament for Holderness; 1939–1950	Constituency abolished
New constituency	Member of Parliament for Bristol North West; 1950–1955	Succeeded by Christopher Boyd
Baronetage of the United Kingdom
New creation	Baronet (of Burnham); 1954–1958	Extinct
