= Arthur Lockwood (politician) =

British political activist

Arthur Lockwood (23 October 1883 – 19 February 1966) was a British political activist.

Born in the Darnall area of Sheffield, Lockwood left school at the age of fourteen. He took various jobs before settling as a pattern-maker. He spent much of his spare time at the Darnall Congregational Church and its associated temperance society. An early member of the Workers Educational Association, he also joined the Independent Labour Party and the Labour Party. This political activity led his employer to sack him, and he instead became an insurance agent.

In 1912, Lockwood stood as a Labour candidate for the Darnall ward on Sheffield City Council, although he was easily defeated. Undeterred, he stood for Sheffield Hillsborough at the 1918 UK general election, with the backing of what became the Co-operative Party. He took 4,050 and a distant second place, but was considered to have built up the party, locally, enabling A. V. Alexander to win the seat for the party in 1922. Lockwood instead moved to London to act as election agent for Alfred Barnes, who won East Ham South in 1922 as a joint Co-operative-Labour candidate.

Following this success, Lockwood became the election agent for the Reading Labour Party and, by 1924, the party's first MP for the town was elected. While in the town, Lockwood also ran the Reading Citizen, a labour movement newspaper, and stood regularly for the town council, but did not win a seat until 1932; he served until 1939, and also for a year in 1944. In 1930, he became the circulation manager for Reynolds' News, but remained based in Reading and served on the committee of the Reading Co-operative Society, including a stint as president from 1947 until 1959. He retired from Reynolds in 1947 and served on the Southern Electricity Board, in 1954 again winning a seat on the council, and serving as Mayor of Reading in 1956.
