= A. V. Alexander, 1st Earl Alexander of Hillsborough =

British politician (1885–1965)

The Right Honourable The Earl Alexander of Hillsborough KG CH PC
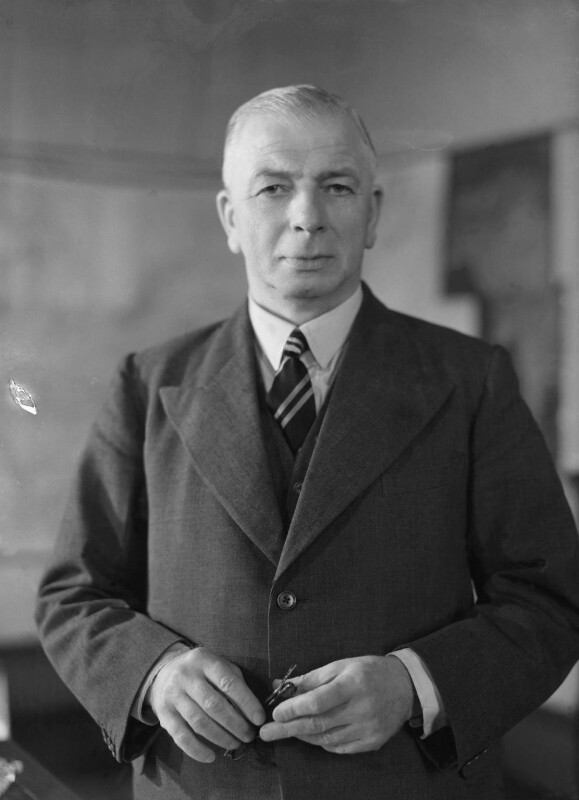
- Alexander in 1942

Leader of the Opposition in the House of Lords Shadow Leader of the House of Lords
- In office 14 December 1955 – 16 October 1964
- Party Leader: Hugh Gaitskell; Harold Wilson
- Preceded by: The Earl Jowitt
- Succeeded by: The Lord Carrington

Chancellor of the Duchy of Lancaster
- In office 28 February 1950 – 26 October 1951
- Prime Minister: Clement Attlee
- Preceded by: Hugh Dalton
- Succeeded by: The Viscount Swinton

Minister of Defence
- In office 20 December 1946 – 28 February 1950
- Prime Minister: Clement Attlee
- Preceded by: Clement Attlee
- Succeeded by: Manny Shinwell

First Lord of the Admiralty
- In office 3 August 1945 – 4 October 1946
- Monarch: George VI
- Prime Minister: Clement Attlee
- Preceded by: Brendan Bracken
- Succeeded by: George Hall
- In office 11 May 1940 – 25 May 1945
- Monarch: George VI
- Prime Minister: Winston Churchill
- Preceded by: Winston Churchill
- Succeeded by: Brendan Bracken
- In office 7 June 1929 – 24 August 1931
- Monarch: George V
- Prime Minister: Ramsay MacDonald
- Preceded by: William Bridgeman
- Succeeded by: Sir Austen Chamberlain

Parliamentary Secretary to the Board of Trade
- In office 23 January 1924 – 4 November 1924
- Monarch: George V
- Prime Minister: Ramsay MacDonald
- Preceded by: Viscount Wolmer
- Succeeded by: Robert Burton-Chadwick

Member of the House of Lords Lord Temporal
- In office 27 February 1950 – 11 January 1965; Hereditary Peerage
- Preceded by: Peerage created
- Succeeded by: Peerage extinct

Member of Parliament for Sheffield Hillsborough
- In office 14 November 1935 – 23 February 1950
- Preceded by: Gurney Braithwaite
- Succeeded by: George Darling
- In office 15 November 1922 – 27 October 1931
- Preceded by: Arthur Neal
- Succeeded by: Gurney Braithwaite

Personal details
- Born: 1 May 1885 Weston-super-Mare, Somerset, England
- Died: 11 January 1965 (aged 79) London, England
- Party: Labour and Co-operative
- Spouse: Esther Chapple (m. 1908)

Albert Victor Alexander, 1st Earl Alexander of Hillsborough (1 May 1885 – 11 January 1965) was a British Labour and Co-operative politician. He was three times First Lord of the Admiralty, including during the Second World War, and then Minister of Defence under Clement Attlee.

== Early life and career ==
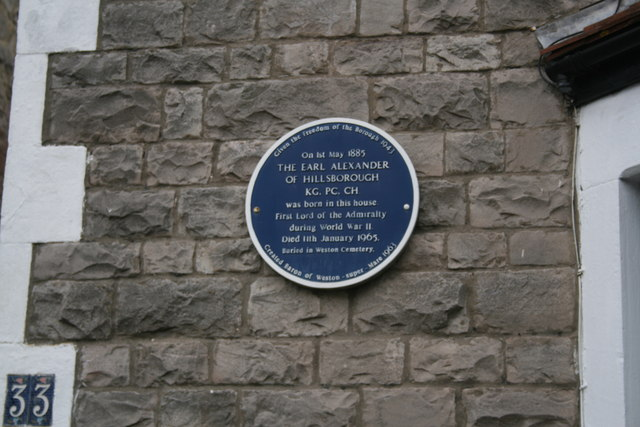
Blue Plaque marking his birthplace

Born in Weston-super-Mare and one of four children, A. V. Alexander was the son of Albert Alexander, a blacksmith and later engineer who had moved from his native Wiltshire to Bristol during the agricultural depression of the 1860s and 1870s, and Eliza Jane Thatcher, daughter of a policeman. He was named after both his father and Prince Albert Victor, Queen Victoria's eldest grandson, but he was known as "A. V." from a young age. His parents had settled in Weston when they married, but the family moved to Bristol after Albert Alexander's death in August 1886. Alexander's mother worked as a corset-maker to provide for her children.

Alexander attended Barton Hill School from the age of three, at a cost of two pence per week. Against his mother's wishes, he chose not to continue to St. George's Higher Grade School in 1898, feeling the increased weekly charge of six pence was too expensive and that he would get nothing more from school. He began work aged thirteen, first for a leather merchant, and five months later as a junior clerk with the Bristol School Board. In 1903 he transferred to Somerset County Council's newly formed local education authority, where he worked in the School Management Department as a committee clerk. He was by this time a keen chorister and footballer, and a self-taught pianist. In later years, and until his death, Alexander was a vice-president of Chelsea F.C.; his role at the club was taken on by Richard Attenborough.

Raised an Anglican, Alexander converted to the Baptist movement in 1908 after he married Esther Ellen Chapple, a school teacher and Baptist. They were married on 6 June 1908. Their daughter, Beatrix, was born in 1909, and their son Ronald lived from 1911 to 1912. Alexander joined the Weston Co-operative Society and became treasurer of the local Young Liberal Association in 1908, and the local Trades and Labour Council in 1909. He was elected to the board of the Weston Co-op Society in 1910.

== First World War ==
He volunteered for service when the First World War began but was not called up until two years later. He joined the Artists Rifles, which principally served to train officers for assignment to other regiments. He trained in London and at Magdalen College, Oxford after he had been commissioned in the Labour Corps in December 1917. His health suffered during training, and he never saw active service but worked as a posting officer in Lancashire. In November 1918, he was promoted to captain, transferred to the General List and became an education officer, preparing wounded soldiers for civilian life. He was demobbed in late 1919. Within a year of returning home, he became vice-president of the Weston Co-op Society and secretary of the Somerset branch of NALGO.

== Parliamentary career ==
In late 1920, Alexander applied for the position of Parliamentary Secretary to the Co-operative Union. He was selected out of 104 candidates, moving to London that November, and would hold the job until 1946. In this role, he directed the presentation of the Co-op's position and interests to government bodies and Member of Parliament (MPs). In July 1921 he campaigned directly to MPs to oppose a clause in the government's Finance Bill which would impose Corporation Tax on Co-ops. Lloyd George's Coalition government, which had a large majority, was defeated by two votes. Shortly after this, the Sheffield branch of the Co-operative Party invited Alexander to be their Parliamentary candidate. He was duly elected for Hillsborough in November 1922, one of only four Co-op MPs. He was re-elected in 1923, 1924 and 1929. He would continue to represent Sheffield, with one break, until 1950.

In his maiden speech, Alexander criticised the Liberal Party for abandoning its progressive principles and championed economic theories that were central to the Labour Party's manifesto. The Labour leadership accepted him as a spokesman on a number of issues, though the Co-op was not affiliated to the Labour Party until 1927. When Labour formed its first government in January 1924, Ramsay MacDonald made Alexander Parliamentary Under-Secretary of State to the Board of Trade, under Sidney Webb and Emmanuel Shinwell. Alexander's responsibilities included the merchant navy, and answering Parliamentary Questions on all trade matters. The Co-op's Parliamentary Committee had an acting secretary in Alexander's place whilst he was in government, but he continued to take part in appeals to ministers.

After the government fell in October 1924, Alexander returned to working for the Co-op full-time. He became well known for his testimonies before government committees, and used the Co-op's Parliamentary Committee to help co-ordinate responses to government action during the 1926 general strike. In Parliament, he became a front bench spokesman on trade, staunchly criticising the policies of the Chancellor of the Exchequer, Winston Churchill. He also spoke on agriculture, local government and on social security, where he called for increased welfare, citing the suffering of his own constituents during the depression. In early 1929, Alexander applied for the position of General Secretary of the Co-operative Union, but was beaten by Robert Palmer. Within weeks, he became a member of the cabinet in the second Labour government.

== First Lord of the Admiralty ==
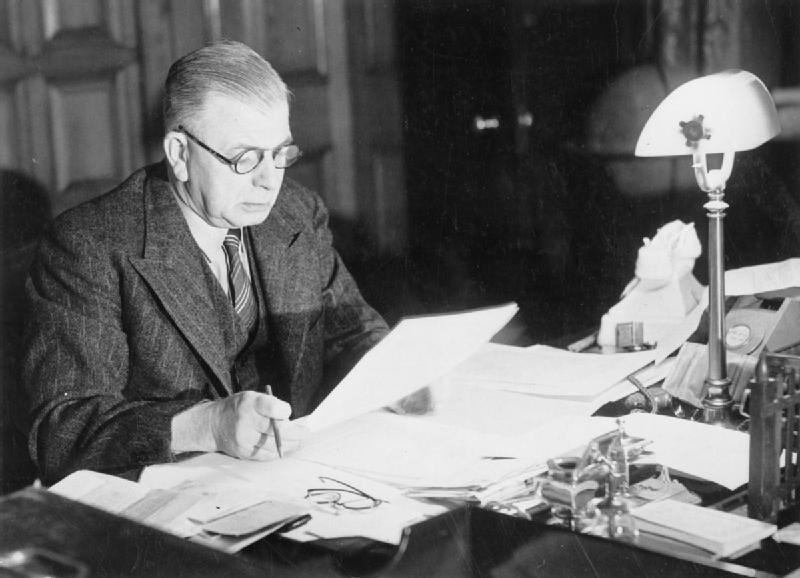
Alexander at his desk at the Admiralty during the Second World War

Although many had expected Alexander to be appointed President of the Board of Trade, this position went to William Graham, protégé of the Chancellor of the Exchequer, Philip Snowden. Instead, Alexander became First Lord of the Admiralty, the only Labour member to hold this position as a cabinet rank. The Admiralty was a political power in its own right, and usually able to resist pressure from the Treasury and from Downing Street. MacDonald's primary concern was international disarmament, and Alexander persuaded the Admiralty to reduce their demands for new cruisers as a prelude to negotiations aimed at ending naval rivalry with the U.S.. In January 1930, a conference between the five major naval powers (Britain, the U.S., France, Italy and Japan) was held in London. This resulted in the London Naval Treaty between Britain, America and Japan, to limit growth and maintain parity of their naval forces. In the spring of 1931, Alexander and the Foreign Secretary, Arthur Henderson, negotiated France and Italy's entry into the treaty. Though Alexander came into conflict with the admiralty over expansion of the fleet, he defended it against criticism of its spending and staffing levels. He also introduced a system to make it easier for working-class recruits to become officers. During the economic crisis in mid-1931, Alexander supported Snowden's defence of free trade against MacDonald and Henderson's proposals for protectionism, but sided with Henderson against Snowden and MacDonald's proposed cuts in government spending, especially unemployment benefit. He organised the cabinet opponents to the cuts, who advocated a socialist economy.

Faced with a cabinet split, the Prime Minister formed a coalition with the Conservative and Liberal parties. Snowden and a few other Labour MPs stayed with MacDonald, but the party went into Opposition. Alexander was prominent on the Opposition front bench, leading attacks on the government's policies, but was careful not to exploit the widespread dissatisfaction with pay cuts in the armed forces (especially the Invergordon Mutiny), concerned that the military should not become involved in political matters. Effectively now number two after Henderson in the Parliamentary Labour Party, he was being talked of as a future leader. Both Alexander and Henderson lost their seats in the 1931 general election. Henderson was succeeded by George Lansbury, and Alexander's contemporary, Clement Attlee, became deputy leader.

For the next four years, Alexander's main role was again as the Co-op's Parliamentary Secretary. He led opposition to renewed government plans to impose Corporation Tax on co-op stores, a fight that was lost this time with the 1933 Finance Bill. He also worked to have consumer interests represented on the new agricultural marketing boards. He was active in the Brotherhood movement (an organisation for nonconformists), spoke at rallies for the League of Nations, wrote columns for Reynold's News and gave lectures on the BBC. Regaining his Hillsborough seat in 1935, Alexander became a front bench spokesman on trade and foreign affairs. Attlee, now leader of the PLP, asked him to join a new defence committee, working with Shinwell and Jack Lawson to reverse the pacifist ideals which had prevailed under Lansbury. Alexander had been warning of the dangers posed by fascism for several years, and criticised the government's policy of appeasement. In 1937, with Hugh Dalton and Hastings Bertram Lees-Smith, he persuaded the PLP to put aside its mistrust of the Baldwin government and support the Service Estimates Bill which began rearmament. In October 1938, he closed the debate on the Munich Pact, attacking the government's abandonment of the Sudeten Germans.

== Under Churchill and Attlee ==
Following the outbreak of World War II, Alexander, like all leading Labour figures, opposed forming a coalition government under Neville Chamberlain. Alexander firmly believed that Winston Churchill should replace Chamberlain as Prime Minister. He worked with Arthur Greenwood, and against Herbert Morrison, who favoured Lord Halifax as successor, to convince Attlee and the party's Executive to support Churchill. In the closing days of April 1940, Churchill met with Alexander, Clement Attlee and Sir Archibald Sinclair to discuss the possibilities for a coalition government. Halifax's friend, Chips Channon, described this as Churchill prematurely forming his cabinet in the expectation of becoming PM. Two weeks later, on 10 May, Churchill was Prime Minister of a coalition government; after forming his War Cabinet, which included Attlee and Greenwood, he invited Alexander and Sinclair (Air), along with Anthony Eden (War, i.e. the Army), to head the three service ministries.

Alexander returned to the Admiralty as First Lord, but like the other service ministers, was dominated by Churchill and existed very much in his shadow. It was a measure of Churchill's confidence in him that he was not given access to the secret information, nor was he allowed in the War Room. By appointing himself his own Minister of Defence, Churchill was well placed to exercise close supervision over the three services.

An example was Churchill's decision to send Force Z including the battleship Prince of Wales and the battlecruiser Repulse to Singapore without, as it transpired, adequate air support. Both Alexander and the First Sea Lord, Dudley Pound had vigorously opposed this deployment but were overruled by Churchill. This decision was made before Pearl Harbor – the ships were sent east as a deterrent to Japanese aggression, at the request of the Australian government and British forces in the Far East. Initially an aircraft carrier HMS Indomitable was included, but she ran aground in the Caribbean, and was not replaced by HMS Hermes which was regarded as too slow. Prince of Wales and Repulse were attacked and sunk by Japanese aircraft off the Malayan coast immediately after the Pearl Harbor attack, before plans for their re-deployment in the light of actual hostilities with the Japanese could be decided upon and executed. Although Churchill had overall responsibility for the deployment, according to Richard Lamb, he 'had no responsibility for the fate of these two battleships'. The Admiralty view, argued for by Alexander and Pound, was that the Prince of Wales and the Repulse would have been better deployed in the Atlantic to counter the German threat from the German battleships Tirpitz, the Scharnhorst and the Gneisenau.

Alexander performed his duties with energy and diligence. He was committed to the administrative duties of his role, often sleeping in his office, but also took a keen interest in the welfare of sailors. He joined an Arctic Convoy in 1942, and visited troops a few days after D-Day in 1944, the first British minister in France since the occupation in 1940. His radio broadcasts and public appearance boosted morale and made him very popular inside and outside the service. As a working-class politician in a top position, he was an important figure for national unity. He had regular meetings with Churchill when in London, acting as an advisor; they were good friends and Churchill arranged for Alexander to receive an Honorary Degree from the University of Bristol, of which Churchill was Chancellor. However, Alexander firmly supported Labour's withdrawal from the coalition in May 1945, following victory in Europe. Campaigning in the election in July, he drew a sharp distinction between Churchill and the Conservative Party, suggesting that the Tories would sideline the wartime leader as they had done Lloyd George in 1922.

A member of the Cabinet following Labour's victory, Alexander strongly supported the Foreign Secretary, Ernest Bevin, sharing his goals of maintaining Britain's influence and opposing the Soviet Union. Britain's wartime ally was admired at the time, and his outspoken criticisms of Russia lessened Alexander's popularity. In 1946 he deputised for Bevin at the Paris Peace Conference, and was part of the Cabinet delegation to India, under Stafford Cripps, exploring possibilities for independence. At the end of 1946 he became Minister of Defence, a role previously held only by Churchill and Attlee when they were serving as Prime Minister. Responsible for all three armed services, he often clashed with the Chief of the Imperial General Staff, Lord Montgomery. He was responsible for formulating the system of national service and faced a protracted fight against Labour backbenchers who opposed the continuation of conscription in peacetime. In January 1947 he was one of six ministers on the Gen 75 Committee that secretly authorised Britain's nuclear programme; in March he was in the negotiations for the Treaty of Dunkirk, laying the foundations for NATO. As the Cold War began, Alexander's criticisms of the USSR gained wider acceptance. In 1948 he became a Freeman of the City of Sheffield.

== Leader in the Lords ==
A. V. Alexander decided not to seek re-election in the 1950 general election. He retired from the Commons and was raised to the peerage as Viscount Alexander of Hillsborough, of Hillsborough in the City of Sheffield, three months before his sixty-fifth birthday. For practical reasons, the Minister of Defence needed to be a member of the Commons, and Emmanuel Shinwell succeeded to this role. However, Alexander retained a seat in the Cabinet as Chancellor of the Duchy of Lancaster. Although he never made it into the "top five" of the Labour government (Attlee, Bevin, Morrison, Dalton and Greenwood, later replaced by Cripps), he remained an influential member throughout. Out of office following Labour's defeat and his health starting to decline, Alexander retired from front-bench politics after the 1951 general election. He bought a farm in Essex and, although he continued to attend the House of Lords, he did not hold any front-bench briefs for the next four years. In December 1955, following the resignation of Lord Jowitt, Alexander was asked by Hugh Gaitskell to take over as leader of the small group of Labour peers. His appointment was strongly supported by Labour's faction in the upper House, and he served in this role for the next nine years.

Alexander spoke on virtually every topic whilst leading the Opposition in the Lords. He supported the introduction of life peers, calling for them to be paid so that such appointments would be practical for working-class people. He also supported Tony Benn's campaign to renounce his peerage, and opposed Britain's early attempts to join the European Economic Community. Now a celebrity within the Co-op movement, Alexander continued to lobby for it in Parliament and with members of the government. In 1956 he became President of the UK Council of Protestant Churches. He often spoke on religious matters in the Lords, fiercely opposing closer relations between the Church of England and the Catholic Church and often quoting scripture at Lords Spiritual. He was created Baron Weston-super-Mare, of Weston-super-Mare in the County of Somerset, and Earl Alexander of Hillsborough in 1963 – the last man to be made an earl until Harold Macmillan became Earl of Stockton in 1984 – and was appointed a Knight Companion of the Garter in 1964. He finally stood down as leader of the Labour peers in the run-up to the general election in October 1964. His last appearance in the Lords was shortly before Christmas that year, when he fiercely defended Harold Wilson's foreign policy from Tory accusations of disloyalty. Aged 79, Lord Alexander of Hillsborough died early in the new year, fourteen days before Winston Churchill. The peerages died with him as he had no sons.

== Arms ==
Coat of arms of A. V. Alexander, 1st Earl Alexander of Hillsborough, KG, CH, PC
Coronet An Earl's Coronet Crest Within a circlet of anchors Sable a demi sun Or. (not shown) Escutcheon Azure semy of bees a beehive Or, on a chief barry wavy of six Argent and Azure a gavel in bend Or.

== Notes ==
Parliament of the United Kingdom
Preceded by Arthur Neal	Member of Parliament for Sheffield Hillsborough; 1922–1931	Succeeded by Gurney Braithwaite
Preceded by Gurney Braithwaite	Member of Parliament for Sheffield Hillsborough; 1935–1950	Succeeded by George Darling
Political offices
Preceded by William Bridgeman	First Lord of the Admiralty; 1929–1931	Succeeded by Sir Austen Chamberlain
Preceded by Winston Churchill	First Lord of the Admiralty; 1940–1945	Succeeded by Brendan Bracken
Preceded by Brendan Bracken	First Lord of the Admiralty; 1945–1946	Succeeded by The Viscount Hall
New office	Minister without Portfolio; 1946	None
Preceded by Clement Attlee	Minister of Defence; 1946–1950	Succeeded by Manny Shinwell
Preceded by Hugh Dalton	Chancellor of the Duchy of Lancaster; 1950–1951	Succeeded by The Viscount Swinton
Party political offices
Preceded by The Earl Jowitt	Leader of the Labour Party in the House of Lords; 1955–1964	Succeeded by The Earl of Longford
Peerage of the United Kingdom
New creation	Earl Alexander of Hillsborough; 1963–1965	Extinct
New creation	Viscount Alexander of Hillsborough; 1950–1965	Extinct
