= Raleigh Chichester-Constable =

English cricketer and soldier

Personal information
- Full name: Raleigh Charles Joseph Chichester-Constable
- Born: 21 December 1890; Great Marlow, Buckinghamshire, England
- Died: 25 June 1963 (aged 72); Burton Constable, Yorkshire, England
- Batting: Right-handed
- Bowling: Right-arm fast

Domestic team information
- Years: Team
- 1935: Minor Counties
- 1926–1927: Marylebone Cricket Club
- 1919: Yorkshire

Career statistics
Competition	First-class
Matches	24
Runs scored	152
Batting average	8.94
100s/50s	–/–
Top score	47*
Balls bowled	413
Wickets	4
Bowling average	60.75
5 wickets in innings	–
10 wickets in match	–
Best bowling	2/42
Catches/stumpings	7/–
- Source: Cricinfo, 20 March 2011

Raleigh Charles Joseph Chichester-Constable (21 December 1890 – 26 May 1963) was an English soldier and cricketer. He played 24 matches of first-class cricket between 1919 and 1935.

== Early life ==
He was born in Great Marlow, Buckinghamshire; his surname was changed from Chichester to Chichester-Constable in January 1895. He was educated at Stonyhurst College in Lancashire.

== Military career ==
Chichester-Constable was commissioned into the Rifle Brigade (The Prince Consort's Own), and served with the 2nd Battalion during the First World War, remaining in the army during the interwar period, and commanding the 46th Division's 139th Brigade from 1940 to 1943 during the Second World War. In the First World War he received the DSO and was wounded six times; in the Second World War he was awarded a bar to his DSO for his service at Dunkirk.

== Cricket career ==
A right-handed batsman and right-arm fast bowler, Chichester-Constable played most of his cricket as the captain of the Yorkshire Second XI from 1926 to 1938. He also played in 24 first-class matches between 1919 and 1935, scoring a total of 152 runs at 8.94, with a top score of 47 not out, and taking four wickets at 60.74. His only match for Yorkshire's First XI came in the game against Essex at The Circle, Kingston upon Hull in July 1919. Batting at number 11 he scored a duck in Yorkshire's first innings of 241, and bowled four overs without success for six runs, as Essex were beaten by an innings and 58 runs.

He played for the Army against the Navy in a first-class match in 1921, taking a career best 2 for 42 as the Army won by 10 wickets, and another first-class match for the Free Foresters against Cambridge University two years later. The bulk of his first-class experience came on a five-month tour of India undertaken by the Marylebone Cricket Club in 1926–27, when Chichester-Constable played in 19 of the 30 first-class matches. His only subsequent first-class matches came in 1935, in two matches for the Minor Counties against Oxford University and Cambridge University.

== Later life ==
He became a farmer and briefly entered politics as an Independent candidate at the 1939 Holderness by-election.

== Personal life ==
Chichester-Constable married Gladys Hanly and they had one son, born in 1927. Gladys died in 1954 and he married Inez Quilter in 1955. He died in May 1963 in Burton Constable in the East Riding of Yorkshire.

Chichester-Constable's son with Gladys, John Raleigh Chichester-Constable DL (6 April 1927 – 23 December 2011), was the owner of Burton Constable Hall, was Lord Paramount of the Seigniory of Holderness, and served as High Sheriff of Humberside in 1979 and 1980.
