= Sheffield Hillsborough =

Parliamentary constituency in the United Kingdom, 1918–2010

Coordinates: 53.408°N 1.488°W

- Former county constituency for the House of Commons
- Boundary of Sheffield Hillsborough in South Yorkshire for the 2005 general election

- Location of South Yorkshire within England
- County: South Yorkshire

1918–2010
- Created from: Sheffield Brightside and Sheffield Hallam
- Replaced by: Sheffield Brightside and Hillsborough, Sheffield Hallam, Penistone and Stocksbridge

Sheffield Hillsborough was a Parliamentary constituency in the City of Sheffield. It was considered a safe Labour seat and was represented by Helen Jackson from 1992 to 2005. She did not stand again in the 2005 general election and was succeeded by Angela Smith.

The Sheffield Hillsborough constituency was abolished at the 2010 General Election. It was divided up and incorporated into the Sheffield Brightside and Hillsborough, Sheffield Hallam and Penistone and Stocksbridge constituencies.

== Boundaries ==
1918–1950: The County Borough of Sheffield wards of Hillsborough, Neepsend, and Walkley.

1950–1955: The County Borough of Sheffield wards of Crookesmoor, Hillsborough, Owlerton, and Walkley.

1955–1974: The County Borough of Sheffield wards of Cathedral, Hillsborough, Owlerton, and Walkley.

1974–1983: The County Borough of Sheffield wards of Hillsborough, Netherthorpe, Owlerton, and Walkley.

1983–2010: The City of Sheffield wards of Chapel Green, Hillsborough, South Wortley, Stocksbridge, and Walkley.

The constituency covered north west Sheffield. It was named for Hillsborough and reached north west to Stocksbridge.

== Members of Parliament ==
Election	Member	Party
1918	Arthur Neal	Coalition Liberal
Jan 1922	Arthur Neal	National Liberal
1922	A. V. Alexander	Labour Co-operative
1931	Gurney Braithwaite	Conservative
1935	A. V. Alexander	Labour Co-operative
1950	George Darling	Labour Co-operative
Feb 1974	Martin Flannery	Labour
1992	Helen Jackson	Labour
2005	Angela Smith	Labour
2010	constituency abolished: see Sheffield Brightside and Hillsborough, Sheffield Hallam and Penistone and Stocksbridge	

== Elections ==
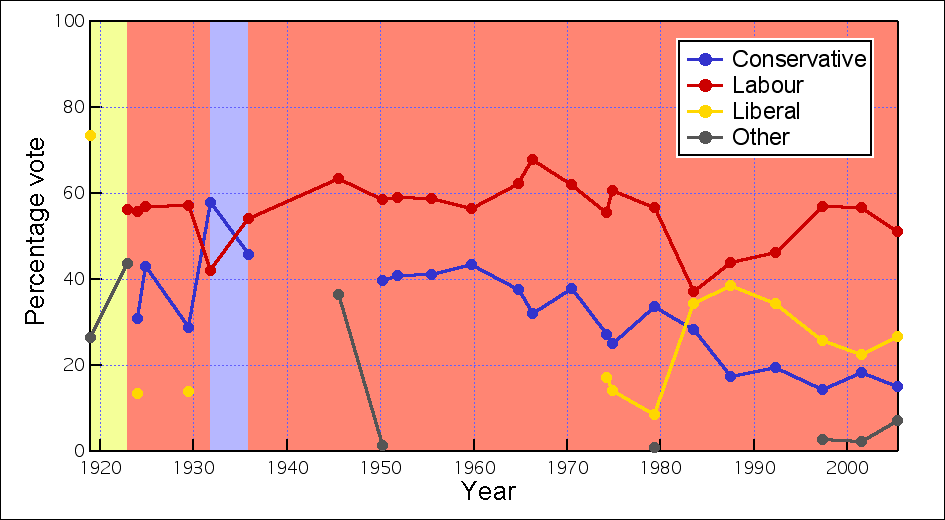
General election results since 1918–2005

=== Elections in the 2000s ===
General election 2005: Sheffield Hillsborough
Party	Candidate	Votes	%	±%
Labour	Angela Smith	23,477	51.17	−5.66
Liberal Democrats	John Commons	12,234	26.66	+4.09
Conservative	Jackie Doyle-Price	6,890	15.02	−3.32
BNP	David Wright	2,010	4.38	New
UKIP	Maurice Patterson	1,273	2.77	+0.51
Majority		11,243	24.51	
Turnout		45,844	60.61	
Labour hold		Swing	-4.87	

General election 2001: Sheffield Hillsborough
Party	Candidate	Votes	%	±%
Labour	Helen Jackson	24,170	56.8	−0.1
Liberal Democrats	John Commons	9,601	22.6	−3.2
Conservative	Graham King	7,801	18.3	+3.8
UKIP	Peter Webb	964	2.3	New
Majority		14,569	34.2	+3.1
Turnout		42,536	57.3	−13.7
Labour hold		Swing		

=== Elections in the 1990s ===
General election 1997: Sheffield Hillsborough
Party	Candidate	Votes	%	±%
Labour	Helen Jackson	30,150	56.9	+10.7
Liberal Democrats	Arthur Dunworth	13,699	25.8	−8.5
Conservative	David Nuttall	7,707	14.5	−5.0
Referendum	John Rusling	1,468	2.8	New
Majority		16,451	31.1	+19.2
Turnout		53,024	71.0	−6.2
Labour hold		Swing		

General election 1992: Sheffield Hillsborough
Party	Candidate	Votes	%	±%
Labour	Helen Jackson	27,568	46.2	+2.2
Liberal Democrats	David Chadwick	20,500	34.3	−4.2
Conservative	Sid Cordle	11,640	19.5	+2.0
Majority		7,068	11.9	+6.4
Turnout		59,708	77.2	−0.8
Labour hold		Swing		

=== Elections in the 1980s ===
General election 1987: Sheffield Hillsborough
Party	Candidate	Votes	%	±%
Labour	Martin Flannery	26,208	44.0	+6.8
Liberal	David Chadwick	22,922	38.5	+4.0
Conservative	John Sykes	10,396	17.5	−10.8
Majority		3,286	5.5	+2.8
Turnout		59,526	78.0	+2.6
Labour hold		Swing		

General election 1983: Sheffield Hillsborough
Party	Candidate	Votes	%	±%
Labour	Martin Flannery	20,901	37.2	
Liberal	David Chadwick	19,355	34.5	
Conservative	Christine Smith	15,881	28.3	
Majority		1,546	2.7	
Turnout		56,137	75.4	
Labour hold		Swing		

=== Elections in the 1970s ===
General election 1979: Sheffield Hillsborough
Party	Candidate	Votes	%	±%
Labour	Martin Flannery	20,556	56.8	−3.9
Conservative	Irvine Patnick	12,206	33.7	+8.5
Liberal	P. A. Neale	3,088	8.5	−5.7
National Front	S. Williams	326	0.9	New
Majority		8,350	23.1	−12.4
Turnout		36,176	70.8	+4.2
Labour hold		Swing		

General election October 1974: Sheffield Hillsborough
Party	Candidate	Votes	%	±%
Labour	Martin Flannery	21,026	60.7	+5.1
Conservative	Brian Williamson	8,718	25.2	−2.0
Liberal	Robin Osner	4,912	14.2	−3.1
Majority		12,308	35.5	+7.1
Turnout		34,656	66.6	−10.2
Labour hold		Swing		

General election February 1974: Sheffield Hillsborough
Party	Candidate	Votes	%	±%
Labour	Martin Flannery	22,065	55.6	−6.5
Conservative	Brian Williamson	10,785	27.2	−10.7
Liberal	Robin Osner	6,863	17.3	New
Majority		11,280	28.4	+4.2
Turnout		39,713	76.8	+11.8
Labour hold		Swing		

General election 1970: Sheffield Hillsborough
Party	Candidate	Votes	%	±%
Labour Co-op	George Darling	18,775	62.1	−5.8
Conservative	Irvine Patnick	11,445	37.9	+5.8
Majority		7,330	24.2	−11.6
Turnout		30,220	65.0	−5.3
Labour Co-op hold		Swing		

=== Elections in the 1960s ===
General election 1966: Sheffield Hillsborough
Party	Candidate	Votes	%	±%
Labour Co-op	George Darling	22,799	67.9	+5.4
Conservative	Michael J Mallett	10,774	32.1	−5.5
Majority		12,025	35.8	+11.0
Turnout		33,573	70.3	−4.2
Labour Co-op hold		Swing		

General election 1964: Sheffield Hillsborough
Party	Candidate	Votes	%	±%
Labour Co-op	George Darling	22,071	62.4	+5.9
Conservative	Robert James Lawther	13,278	37.6	−5.9
Majority		8,793	24.8	+11.8
Turnout		35,349	74.5	−1.4
Labour Co-op hold		Swing		

=== Elections in the 1950s ===
General election 1959: Sheffield Hillsborough
Party	Candidate	Votes	%	±%
Labour Co-op	George Darling	21,888	56.5	−2.3
National Liberal	Stanley Kenneth Arnold	16,845	43.5	+2.3
Majority		5,043	13.0	−4.6
Turnout		38,733	75.9	+2.9
Labour Co-op hold		Swing		

General election 1955: Sheffield Hillsborough
Party	Candidate	Votes	%	±%
Labour Co-op	George Darling	23,438	58.8	−0.2
National Liberal	Stanley Kenneth Arnold	16,428	41.2	+0.2
Majority		7,010	17.6	−0.4
Turnout		39,866	73.0	−11.9
Labour Co-op hold		Swing		

General election 1951: Sheffield Hillsborough
Party	Candidate	Votes	%	±%
Labour Co-op	George Darling	28,274	59.0	+0.3
National Liberal	George Wadsworth	19,617	41.0	+1.2
Majority		8,657	18.0	−0.9
Turnout		47,891	84.9	−2.2
Labour Co-op hold		Swing	-0.5	

General election 1950: Sheffield Hillsborough
Party	Candidate	Votes	%	±%
Labour Co-op	George Darling	28,295	58.7	−4.7
National Liberal	Knowles Edge	19,613	39.8	+3.2
Communist	Mick Bennett	759	1.5	New
Majority		9,312	18.9	−7.9
Turnout		48,667	87.1	+11.1
Labour Co-op hold		Swing		

=== Elections in the 1940s ===
General election 1945: Sheffield Hillsborough
Party	Candidate	Votes	%	±%
Labour Co-op	A. V. Alexander	24,959	63.4	+9.1
National Liberal	Sir Robert Hampden Hobart, 3rd Baronet	14,403	36.6	−9.1
Majority		10,556	26.8	+18.2
Turnout		39,362	76.0	−0.8
Labour Co-op hold		Swing	+9.1	

=== Elections in the 1930s ===
General election 1935: Sheffield Hillsborough
Party	Candidate	Votes	%	±%
Labour Co-op	A. V. Alexander	21,025	54.3	+12.3
Conservative	Gurney Braithwaite	17,721	45.7	−12.2
Majority		3,304	8.6	N/A
Turnout		38,746	76.8	−4.8
Labour Co-op gain from Conservative		Swing	+12.3	

General election 1931: Sheffield Hillsborough
Party	Candidate	Votes	%	±%
Conservative	Gurney Braithwaite	23,819	57.9	+29.1
Labour Co-op	A. V. Alexander	17,319	42.1	−15.2
Majority		6,500	15.8	N/A
Turnout		41,138	81.6	+4.0
Conservative gain from Labour Co-op		Swing		

=== Elections in the 1920s ===
General election 1929: Sheffield Hillsborough
Party	Candidate	Votes	%	±%
Labour Co-op	A. V. Alexander	20,941	57.3	+0.4
Unionist	Albert Harland	10,489	28.8	−14.3
Liberal	Edward Hugh Frederick Morris	5,053	13.9	New
Majority		10,452	28.5	+14.7
Turnout		36,483	77.6	−0.3
Labour Co-op hold		Swing	+7.3	

General election 1924: Sheffield Hillsborough
Party	Candidate	Votes	%	±%
Labour Co-op	A. V. Alexander	16,573	56.9	+1.2
Conservative	Norman Graham Thwaites	12,554	43.1	+12.2
Majority		4,019	13.8	−11.0
Turnout		29,127	77.9	+4.6
Labour Co-op hold		Swing		

General election 1923: Sheffield Hillsborough
Party	Candidate	Votes	%	±%
Labour Co-op	A. V. Alexander	15,087	55.7	−0.5
Unionist	Charles Boot	8,369	30.9	New
Liberal	Ernest Woodhead	3,636	13.4	−30.4
Majority		6,718	24.8	+12.4
Turnout		27,092	73.3	−1.4
Labour Co-op hold		Swing		

General election 1922: Sheffield Hillsborough
Party	Candidate	Votes	%	±%
Labour Co-op	A. V. Alexander	15,130	56.2	New
National Liberal	Arthur Neal	11,812	43.8	−29.6
Majority		3,318	12.4	N/A
Turnout		26,942	74.7	+35.5
Labour Co-op gain from National Liberal		Swing		

=== Elections in the 1910s ===
Arthur Neal

General election 1918: Sheffield Hillsborough
Party		Candidate	Votes	%
C	Coalition Liberal	Arthur Neal	11,171	73.4
	Co-operative Party	Arthur Lockwood	4,050	26.6
Majority			7,121	46.8
Turnout			15,221	42.2
	National Liberal win (new seat)			
C indicates candidate endorsed by the coalition government.

== See also ==
- List of parliamentary constituencies in South Yorkshire

== Sources ==
- BBC Election 2005
- BBC Vote 2001
- Guardian Unlimited Politics (Election results from 1992 to the present)
- Leigh Rayment's Historical List of MPs – Constituencies beginning with "H" (part 3)
- http://www.psr.keele.ac.uk/ (Election results from 1951 to the present)
- F. W. S. Craig, British Parliamentary Election Results 1918 - 1949
- F. W. S. Craig, British Parliamentary Election Results 1950 - 1970
- Sheffield General Election Results 1945 - 2001, Sheffield City Council
