= Samuel Savery =

British politician (1861–1938)

Sir Samuel Savery MP

Member of Parliament for Holderness
- In office 6 December 1923 – 27 December 1938
- Preceded by: Audley Bowdler
- Succeeded by: Gurney Braithwaite

Personal details
- Born: March 1861 Oxford, United Kingdom
- Died: 27 December 1938 (aged 77) Cheltenham, United Kingdom
- Party: Conservative
- Education: Christ Church, Oxford

Sir Samuel Servington Savery (March 1861 – 27 December 1938) was a British Conservative Party politician who served as the Member of Parliament (MP) for Holderness from 1923 to 1938. He was also founder and the first Headmaster of Bramcote School, Scarborough.

== Early life and education ==
Savery was born in Oxford the son of Rev. George Savery. He was educated at Kingswood School in Bath, Somerset. He obtained a Master of Arts from Christ Church, Oxford before going to Scarborough, North Yorkshire and founding Bramcote Preparatory School.

== Political career ==
During his career he was a member of Holderness County Council, North Riding County Council and was also a Justice of the Peace in Scarborough.

Savery was elected Chairman of the Scarborough and Whitby Conservative Association, although he was eventually chosen by Holderness Conservative Association to contest the 1923 general election for that constituency. At the 1923 general election he was elected Member of Parliament (MP) for Holderness. He defeated the Liberal Party incumbent, Audley Bowdler, who had enacted the first change of party allegiance of the constituency in its history. He held the seat until his death in 1938, aged 77. In 1937, Savery was knighted for "public and political services."

== Death ==
Until his death, Savery's age was a mystery with Debrett's giving his age as "Born 18..." and Whitaker's Almanack simply as "Born..." Several hours after his death, however, his age, which was 77, was revealed to the world.

== Arms ==
Coat of arms of Samuel Savery
Notes Granted 10 May 1037 by Garter Wollaston and Clarenceux Cochrane. Crest Between two wings Sable a heron's head erased Argent collared and holding in the beak a spur. Escutcheon Gules a chevron Vair between three unicorns' heads couped Or a spur of the last. Motto Aut Vita Libera Aut Mors Gloriosa Badge A glass wine bottle emitting smoke Proper.

Parliament of the United Kingdom
Preceded by William Bowdler	Member of Parliament for Holderness; 1923–1938	Succeeded by Gurney Braithwaite
