= Constituency election results in England in the 1923 United Kingdom general election =

31st Parliament	(1918)
32nd Parliament	(1922)
33rd Parliament	(1923)
34th Parliament	(1924)
35th Parliament	(1929)

Results of the election by constituency

This is a complete alphabetical list of constituency election results in England to the 33rd Parliament of the United Kingdom at the 1923 general election, held on 6 December 1923. See Constituency election results in the 1923 United Kingdom general election for the rest of the United Kingdom.

== Notes ==
- Change in % vote and swing is calculated between the winner and second place and their respective performances at the 1922 election. A plus denotes a swing to the winner and a minus against the winner.

== London Boroughs ==
Balham and Tooting
Party	Candidate	Votes	%	±%
Unionist	Alfred Butt	12,695	49.4	−18.8
Liberal	George Little	7,477	29.1	−2.7
Labour	Edward Archbold	5,536	21.5	n/a
Majority		5,218	20.3	−16.1
Turnout			61.1	0.0
Unionist hold		Swing	-8.0	

Battersea North
Party	Candidate	Votes	%	±%
Liberal	Henry Hogbin	12,527	50.4	+8.8
Communist	Shapurji Saklatvala	12,341	49.6	−0.9
Majority		186	0.8	9.7
Turnout			61.9	
Liberal gain from Communist		Swing	+4.9	

Battersea South
Party	Candidate	Votes	%	±%
Unionist	Francis Curzon	14,558	52.0	−9.5
Labour	Albert Winfield	13,440	48.0	+9.5
Majority		1,118	4.0	−19.0
Turnout			63.5	
Unionist hold		Swing	-9.5	

Bermondsey West
Party	Candidate	Votes	%	±%
Liberal	Roderick Kedward	9,186	52.5	+21.6
Labour	Alfred Salter	8,298	47.5	+2.9
Majority		888	5.0	18.7
Turnout			66.1	+1.5
Liberal gain from Labour		Swing	+9.4	

Bethnal Green North East
Party	Candidate	Votes	%	±%
Labour	Walter Windsor	7,415	45.7	+12.4
Liberal	Garnham Edmonds	6,790	41.8	+5.7
Unionist	Robert Tasker	2,035	12.5	−5.0
Majority		625	3.9	4.7
Turnout			59.1	+0.3
Labour gain from Liberal		Swing	+3.3	

Bethnal Green South West
Party	Candidate	Votes	%	±%
Liberal	Percy Harris	5,735	43.3	+2.6
Labour	Joe Vaughan	5,251	39.6	+7.7
Unionist	John Cecil Gerard Leigh	2,267	17.1	−10.3
Majority		484	3.7	−5.1
Turnout			62.2	+2.3
Liberal hold		Swing	-2.5	

Bow and Bromley
Party	Candidate	Votes	%	±%
Labour	George Lansbury	15,336	68.8	+4.7
Unionist	Irving Albery	6,941	31.2	−4.7
Majority		8,395	37.6	+9.4
Turnout			63.7	−6.2
Labour hold		Swing	+4.7	

Brixton
Party	Candidate	Votes	%	±%
Liberal	Frederick Laverack	10,881	53.5	+8.3
Unionist	Davison Dalziel	9,476	46.5	−8.3
Majority		1,405	7.0	16.6
Turnout			51.9	−0.9
Liberal gain from Unionist		Swing	+8.3	

Camberwell North
Party	Candidate	Votes	%	±%
Labour	Charles Ammon	10,620	64.2	+13.4
Unionist	Helen Gwynne-Vaughan	5,934	35.8	−13.4
Majority		4,686	28.3	+26.7
Turnout		16,554	56.9	+0.2
Labour hold		Swing	+13.4	

Camberwell North West
Party	Candidate	Votes	%	±%
Liberal	Thomas Macnamara	6,843	34.8	n/a
Labour	Hyacinth Morgan	6,763	34.4	+3.5
Unionist	Edward Campbell	6,045	30.8	n/a
Majority		80	0.4	−18.3
Turnout			61.9	−1.9
Liberal hold		Swing	n/a	

Chelsea
Party	Candidate	Votes	%	±%
Unionist	Samuel Hoare	10,461	57.0	−17.9
Labour	Bertrand Russell	5,047	27.5	+2.4
Liberal	Harry Westbury Preston	2,846	15.5	+15.5
Majority		5,414	29.5	−20.2
Turnout			63.8	+0.7
Unionist hold		Swing	-10.1	

City of London (2 seats)
Party	Candidate	Votes	%	±%
Unionist	Frederick Banbury	Unopposed	n/a	n/a
Unionist	Edward Grenfell	Unopposed	n/a	n/a
Unionist hold		Swing	n/a	

Clapham
Party	Candidate	Votes	%	±%
Unionist	John Leigh	10,287	46.4	
Labour	Leopold Spero	6,404	28.9	
Liberal	Thomas George Graham	5,479	24.7	
Majority		3,883	17.5	
Turnout			60.7	
Unionist hold		Swing		

Deptford
Party	Candidate	Votes	%	±%
Labour	C. W. Bowerman	21,576	63.0	
Unionist	Marshall James Pike	12,666	37.0	
Majority		8,910	26.0	
Turnout			63.3	
Labour hold		Swing		

Dulwich
Party	Candidate	Votes	%	±%
Unionist	Frederick Hall	10,855	53.4	
Liberal	C. R. Cooke-Taylor	9,488	46.6	
Majority		1,367	6.8	
Turnout			61.3	
Unionist hold		Swing		

Finsbury
Party	Candidate	Votes	%	±%
Labour	George Gillett	8,907	42.4	+19.1
Unionist	Martin Archer-Shee	7,063	33.6	−11.0
Liberal	Alfred Scott	5,054	24.0	−6.4
Majority		1,844	8.8	30.1
Turnout		21,024	53.8	−0.5
Labour gain from Unionist		Swing	+15.0	

Fulham East
Party	Candidate	Votes	%	±%
Unionist	Kenyon Vaughan-Morgan	9,757	43.9	−17.6
Labour	John Palmer	7,683	34.5	−0.5
Liberal	Robert Crawford Hawkin	4,817	21.6	+8.1
Majority		2,074	9.4	−17.1
Turnout			58.0	0.0
Unionist hold		Swing	-8.5	

Fulham West
Party	Candidate	Votes	%	±%
Unionist	Cyril Cobb	9,965	39.5	−24.9
Labour	Robert Mark Gentry	8,687	34.4	−1.2
Liberal	Christopher White Courtenay	6,604	26.1	n/a
Majority		1,278	5.1	−23.7
Turnout		25,256	62.9	+4.5
Unionist hold		Swing	-11.8	

Greenwich
Party	Candidate	Votes	%	±%
Labour	Edward Timothy Palmer	12,314	42.7	
Unionist	George Hume	10,746	37.2	
Liberal	Charles Garfield Lott Du Cann	5,806	20.1	
Majority		1,568	5.5	
Turnout			61.8	
Labour gain from Unionist		Swing		

Hackney Central
Party	Candidate	Votes	%	±%
Liberal	Leonard Franklin	8,569	38.6	+6.3
Unionist	Daniel Thomas Keymer	7,252	32.7	−13.7
Labour	Ernest Edwin Hunter	6,354	28.7	+7.4
Majority		1,317	5.9	20.0
Turnout		22,175	62.8	+2.5
Liberal hold		Swing	+10.0	

Hackney North
Party	Candidate	Votes	%	±%
Liberal	John Harris	11,177	54.0	+16.3
Unionist	Walter Greene	9,523	46.0	−16.3
Majority		1,654	8.0	32.6
Turnout			61.2	−2.3
Liberal gain from Unionist		Swing	+16.3	

Hackney South
Party	Candidate	Votes	%	±%
Labour	Herbert Morrison	9,578	42.8	−5.8
Liberal	George Garro-Jones	6,757	30.2	n/a
Unionist	Clifford Erskine-Bolst	6,047	27.0	−24.4
Majority		2,821	12.6	+29.6
Turnout			65.8	−4.2
Labour gain from Unionist		Swing	n/a	

Hammersmith North
Party	Candidate	Votes	%	±%
Labour	James Patrick Gardner	8,101	41.0	+11.2
Unionist	Ellis Ashmead-Bartlett	7,256	36.8	−9.5
Liberal	Frederick L. Coysh	4,374	22.2	−1.7
Majority		845	4.2	20.7
Turnout			63.0	+3.0
Labour gain from Unionist		Swing	+10.3	

Hammersmith South
Party	Candidate	Votes	%	±%
Unionist	William Bull	8,184	43.4	−19.6
Labour	Wyndham James Albery	6,974	36.9	−0.1
Liberal	Ernest Devan Wetton	3,723	19.7	n/a
Majority		1,210	6.5	−19.5
Turnout			61.1	+4.7
Unionist hold		Swing	-9.7	

Hampstead
Party	Candidate	Votes	%	±%
Unionist	George Balfour	13,513	58.6	−1.1
Liberal	Lancelot Sackville Fletcher	9,538	41.4	+23.9
Majority		3,975	17.2	−19.7
Turnout		23,051	58.0	−5.1
Unionist hold		Swing	-1.1	

Holborn
Party	Candidate	Votes	%	±%
Unionist	James Remnant	7,892	59.4	−11.1
Liberal	John Salter Stooke-Vaughan	3,349	25.2	−4.3
Labour	Augustus West	2,044	15.4	n/a
Majority		4,543	34.2	−13.0
Turnout			48.8	+1.6
Unionist hold		Swing	-3.4	

Islington East
Party	Candidate	Votes	%	±%
Liberal	Arthur Comyns-Carr	10,670	40.1	+8.9
Unionist	Austin Hudson	9,038	33.9	−12.2
Labour	Ethel Bentham	6,941	26.0	+3.3
Majority		1,632	6.2	21.1
Turnout			60.0	+0.6
Liberal gain from Unionist		Swing	+10.1	

Islington North
Party	Candidate	Votes	%	±%
Unionist	Henry Cowan	10,802	36.5	−10.5
Liberal	Norman Thomas Carr Sargant	10,219	34.6	+9.4
Labour	George Bennett	8,556	28.9	+1.1
Majority		583	1.9	−17.3
Turnout			61.6	+0.5
Unionist hold		Swing	-10.0	

Islington South
Party	Candidate	Votes	%	±%
Labour	William Cluse	7,764	37.0	+6.7
Liberal	Edward Brotherton-Ratcliffe	7,531	35.9	+2.3
Unionist	Charles Garland	5,691	27.1	−9.0
Majority		233	1.1	3.6
Turnout			60.9	−3.3
Labour gain from Unionist		Swing	+2.2	

Islington West
Party	Candidate	Votes	%	±%
Labour	Frederick Montague	7,955	41.4	+15.6
Unionist	James Despencer-Robertson	5,829	30.3	−8.6
Liberal	Joseph William Molden	5,443	28.3	−7.0
Majority		2,126	11.1	14.7
Turnout			57.7	+0.2
Labour gain from Unionist		Swing	+12.1	

Kennington
Party	Candidate	Votes	%	±%
Labour	Thomas Williams	8,292	39.2	+3.1
Unionist	Reginald Blair	7,782	36.8	−10.5
Liberal	Owen Jacobsen	5,075	24.0	+7.4
Majority		510	2.4	13.6
Turnout			57.6	−0.8
Labour gain from Unionist		Swing	+6.8	

Kensington North
Party	Candidate	Votes	%	±%
Unionist	Percy Gates	9,458	39.4	−13.7
Labour	William Joseph Jarrett	8,888	37.0	+10.2
Liberal	Leonard Stein	5,672	23.6	+3.5
Majority		570	2.4	−23.9
Turnout			55.8	+0.9
Unionist hold		Swing	-12.0	

Kensington South
Party	Candidate	Votes	%	±%
Unionist	William Davison	unopposed	n/a	n/a
Unionist hold		Swing	n/a	

Lambeth North
Party	Candidate	Votes	%	±%
Liberal	Frank Briant	9,036	48.5	+5.4
Unionist	Ernest Bird	5,509	29.6	−9.5
Labour	Fred Hughes	4,089	21.9	+4.1
Majority		3,527	18.9	+14.9
Turnout			59.8	−2.4
Liberal hold		Swing	+7.5	

Lewisham East
Party	Candidate	Votes	%	±%
Unionist	Assheton Pownall	13,560	44.4	−13.2
Labour	Ernest Wesley Wilton	9,604	31.4	+2.5
Liberal	Edward Penton	7,397	24.2	+10.7
Majority		3,956	13.0	−15.7
Turnout			62.6	−1.4
Unionist hold		Swing	-7.8	

Lewisham West
Party	Candidate	Votes	%	±%
Unionist	Philip Dawson	12,448	50.9	−14.8
Liberal	Barrett Lennard Albemarle O'Malley	12,009	49.1	+14.8
Majority		439	1.8	−29.6
Turnout			57.0	−1.1
Unionist hold		Swing	-14.8	

Limehouse
Party	Candidate	Votes	%	±%
Labour	Clement Attlee	11,473	68.5	+13.1
Unionist	Thomas Miller-Jones	5,288	31.5	n/a
Majority		6,185	37.0	+26.2
Turnout			55.0	−2.8
Labour hold		Swing	n/a	

Mile End
Party	Candidate	Votes	%	±%
Labour	John Scurr	6,219	41.0	+5.5
Unionist	Walter Preston	4,741	31.2	−9.8
Liberal	Robert Bernard Solomon	4,215	27.8	+4.3
Majority		1,478	9.8	15.3
Turnout			63.8	0.0
Labour gain from Unionist		Swing	+7.6	

Norwood
Party	Candidate	Votes	%	±%
Unionist	Walter Greaves-Lord	12,725	49.3	−11.5
Liberal	Frank Dawson Lapthorn	8,127	31.4	+7.9
Labour	William Archer Hodgson	5,002	19.3	+3.6
Majority		4,598	17.9	−19.4
Turnout			59.4	−2.3
Unionist hold		Swing	-9.7	

Paddington North
Party	Candidate	Votes	%	±%
Unionist	William Perring	8,721	38.7	−23.9
Labour	John William Gordon	6,954	30.8	n/a
Liberal	Herbert Arthur Baker	6,873	30.5	−6.9
Majority		1,767	7.9	−17.3
Turnout		22,548	59.7	+14.1
Unionist hold		Swing	n/a	

Paddington South
Party	Candidate	Votes	%	±%
Unionist	Douglas King	9,971	71.7	+4.6
Liberal	Hubert Carr-Gomm	3,939	28.3	n/a
Majority		6,032	43.4	+9.2
Turnout			46.3	−4.2
Unionist hold		Swing	n/a	

Peckham
Party	Candidate	Votes	%	±%
Unionist	Collingwood Hughes	8,526	36.0	−8.4
Labour	Walter Ashbridge Chambers	8,370	35.3	+11.7
Liberal	Charles William Tagg	6,815	28.7	+23.4
Majority		156	0.7	−17.0
Turnout			61.4	−4.7
Unionist hold		Swing	-10.0	

Poplar South
Party	Candidate	Votes	%	±%
Labour	Samuel March	14,537	64.8	+6.0
Liberal	Harold Heathcote-Williams	7,899	35.2	−6.0
Majority		6,638	29.6	+12.0
Turnout			59.5	−7.0
Labour hold		Swing	+6.0	

Putney
Party	Candidate	Votes	%	±%
Unionist	Samuel Samuel	unopposed	n/a	n/a
Unionist hold		Swing	n/a	

Rotherhithe
Party	Candidate	Votes	%	±%
Labour	Ben Smith	9,019	48.0	+11.7
Unionist	John Lort-Williams	5,741	30.5	−6.0
Liberal	Richard Hazleton	4,035	21.5	−5.7
Majority		3,278	17.5	17.7
Turnout			63.8	+0.4
Labour gain from Unionist		Swing	+8.8	

Shoreditch
Party	Candidate	Votes	%	±%
Labour	Ernest Thurtle	13,874	56.6	+20.1
Liberal	Ernest Griffith Price	10,658	43.4	+17.5
Majority		3,216	13.2	14.3
Turnout		24,532	47.4	+0.0
Labour gain from National Liberal		Swing	+1.3	

Southwark Central
Party	Candidate	Votes	%	±%
Liberal	James Daniel Gilbert	8,676	45.3	−20.3
Labour	Harry Day	6,690	34.9	+0.5
Unionist	Charles Louis Nordon	3,801	19.8	n/a
Majority		1,986	10.4	−20.8
Liberal hold		Swing	-10.4	

Southwark North
Party	Candidate	Votes	%	±%
Labour	Leslie Haden-Guest	7,665	51.2	+5.2
Liberal	Edward Strauss	7,303	48.8	−5.2
Majority		362	2.4	10.4
Turnout			59.7	+3.6
Labour gain from Liberal		Swing	+5.2	

Southwark South East
Party	Candidate	Votes	%	±%
Labour	Thomas Naylor	9,374	54.3	+10.7
Liberal	Maurice Alexander	7,884	45.7	−10.7
Majority		1,490	8.6	21.4
Turnout			55.7	−2.5
Labour gain from Liberal		Swing	+10.7	

St. Marylebone
Party	Candidate	Votes	%	±%
Unionist	Douglas Hogg	16,763	66.6	n/a
Labour	James Jonas Dodd	8,424	33.4	n/a
Majority		8,339	33.2	n/a
Turnout			52.5	n/a
Unionist hold		Swing	n/a	

St Pancras North
Party	Candidate	Votes	%	±%
Labour	James Marley	10,931	43.0	+9.4
Unionist	John William Lorden	8,085	31.9	−5.8
Liberal	Henry Delacombe Roome	6,363	25.1	−3.6
Majority		2,846	11.1	15.2
Turnout			68.2	+2.2
Labour gain from Unionist		Swing	+7.6	

St Pancras South East
Party	Candidate	Votes	%	±%
Labour	Herbert Romeril	7,866	41.6	+11.1
Unionist	John Hopkins	7,174	37.9	−9.6
Liberal	George Swaffield	3,890	20.5	−1.5
Majority		692	3.7	20.7
Turnout				
Labour gain from Unionist		Swing	+10.3	

St Pancras South West
Party	Candidate	Votes	%	±%
Unionist	Richard Barnett	7,097	42.0	−7.4
Labour	George Horne	5,321	31.4	+13.8
Liberal	William Charles Pilley	4,505	26.6	−6.4
Majority		1,776	10.6	−5.8
Turnout			56.9	−1.0
Unionist hold		Swing	-10.6	

Stoke Newington
Party	Candidate	Votes	%	±%
Liberal	Ernest Spero	8,365	53.5	+16.5
Unionist	George Jones	7,264	46.5	−16.5
Majority		1,101	7.0	33.0
Turnout			63.5	−1.5
Liberal gain from Unionist		Swing	+16.5	

Streatham
Party	Candidate	Votes	%	±%
Unionist	William Lane-Mitchell	10,598	60.0	−9.1
Liberal	Charles Guy Parsloe	7,075	40.0	+9.1
Majority		3,523	20.0	−18.2
Turnout			61.3	−1.7
Unionist hold		Swing	-9.1	

Wandsworth Central
Party	Candidate	Votes	%	±%
Unionist	John Norton-Griffiths	8,774	47.7	−22.0
Labour	George Pearce Blizard	5,294	28.7	−1.6
Liberal	Edward Maynard Coningsby Denney	4,357	23.6	n/a
Majority		3,480	19.0	−20.4
Turnout		18,425	62.0	+0.6
Unionist hold		Swing	-10.2	

Westminster Abbey
Party	Candidate	Votes	%	±%
Unionist	John Sanctuary Nicholson	Unopposed	n/a	n/a
Unionist hold		Swing	n/a	

Westminster St George's
Party	Candidate	Votes	%	±%
Unionist	James Erskine	Unopposed	n/a	n/a
Unionist hold		Swing	n/a	

Whitechapel and St. George's
Party	Candidate	Votes	%	±%
Labour	Harry Gosling	7,812	54.0	+13.8
Liberal	James Kiley	6,656	46.0	+8.6
Majority		1,156	8.0	+5.2
Turnout			58.3	−5.8
Labour hold		Swing	+2.6	

Woolwich East
Party	Candidate	Votes	%	±%
Labour	Harry Snell	15,766	61.6	+4.5
Unionist	Ernest Taylor	9,839	38.4	−4.5
Majority		5,927	23.2	+9.0
Turnout			74.4	−6.0
Labour hold		Swing	+4.5	

Woolwich West
Party	Candidate	Votes	%	±%
Unionist	Kingsley Wood	12,380	52.2	−8.0
Labour	William Barefoot	11,357	47.8	+8.0
Majority		1,023	4.4	−16.0
Turnout			67.8	−2.3
Unionist hold		Swing	-8.0	

== Rest of England ==
=== A to E ===
Abingdon
Party	Candidate	Votes	%	±%
Liberal	Edward Lessing	10,932	50.6	+1.9
Unionist	Ralph Glyn	10,678	49.4	−1.9
Majority		254	1.2	3.8
Turnout			79.5	+2.4
Liberal gain from Unionist		Swing	+1.9	

Accrington
Party	Candidate	Votes	%	±%
Liberal	Hugh Edwards	19,981	54.3	+29.2
Labour	Charles Buxton	16,793	45.7	+1.4
Majority		3,188	8.6	22.3
Turnout			86.5	−2.2
Liberal gain from Labour		Swing	+13.9	

Acton
Party	Candidate	Votes	%	±%
Unionist	Harry Brittain	8,943	42.6	
Labour	Herbert Alphonsus Baldwin	6,069	28.9	
Liberal	Bertram Arthur Levinson	5,981	28.5	
Majority		2,874	13.7	
Turnout		20,993	66.9	
Unionist hold		Swing		

Aldershot
Party	Candidate	Votes	%	±%
Unionist	Roundell Palmer	9,131	59.1	
Liberal	Alfred Suenson-Taylor	6,315	40.9	
Majority		2,816	18.2	
Turnout		15,446		
Unionist hold		Swing		

Altrincham
Party	Candidate	Votes	%	±%
Liberal	Robert Alstead	19,046	54.2	+21.7
Unionist	George Hamilton	16,081	45.8	−8.0
Majority		2,965	8.4	29.7
Turnout		35,127	76.6	−3.2
Liberal gain from Unionist		Swing	+14.9	

Ashford
Party	Candidate	Votes	%	±%
Unionist	Samuel Strang Steel	12,644	62.1	−7.0
Labour	Basil Noble	7,709	37.9	+7.0
Majority		4,935	24.2	−14.0
Turnout			57.8	
Unionist hold		Swing	+17.0	

Ashton-under-Lyne
Party	Candidate	Votes	%	±%
Unionist	Walter de Frece	7,813	36.2	−21.4
Liberal	Henry Greenwood	7,574	35.1	n/a
Labour	Ellen Wilkinson	6,208	28.7	−13.7
Majority		239	1.1	−14.1
Turnout		21,595	85.3	+2.0
Unionist hold		Swing	n/a	

Aylesbury
Party	Candidate	Votes	%	±%
Liberal	Thomas Keens	13,575	47.9	+1.0
Unionist	Alan Burgoyne	13,504	47.6	−3.5
Labour	Fred Watkins	1,275	4.5	n/a
Majority		71	0.3	n/a
Turnout			74.7	+3.3
Liberal gain from Unionist		Swing	+1.3	

Banbury
Party	Candidate	Votes	%	±%
Unionist	James Edmondson	12,490	45.8	−0.7
Liberal	C. B. Fry	12,271	45.0	+15.6
Labour	Ernest Bennett	2,500	9.2	−14.9
Majority		219	0.8	−16.3
Turnout			76.0	−0.4
Unionist hold		Swing	-8.2	

Barkston Ash
Party	Candidate	Votes	%	±%
Unionist	George Lane-Fox	12,932	49.1	
Labour	George Lewis Ward	7,964	30.3	
Liberal	John Lambert	5,425	20.6	
Majority		4,968	18.8	
Turnout			76.1	
Unionist hold		Swing		

Barnard Castle
Party	Candidate	Votes	%	±%
Labour	Moss Turner-Samuels	9,171	55.1	+5.8
Unionist	John Rogerson	7,482	44.9	−5.8
Majority		1,689	10.2	11.6
Turnout			78.8	
Labour gain from Unionist		Swing	+5.8	

Barnsley
Party	Candidate	Votes	%	±%
Labour	John Potts	12,674	48.0	−7.1
Unionist	William Craven-Ellis	6,884	26.0	n/a
Liberal	John Neal	6,881	26.0	n/a
Majority		5,790	22.0	+11.8
Turnout			74.1	−1.6
Labour hold		Swing	n/a	

Barnstaple
Party	Candidate	Votes	%	±%
Liberal	Tudor Rees	14,880	50.1	+0.4
Unionist	Basil Peto	13,614	45.8	−4.5
Labour	Richard W. Gifford	1,225	4.1	n/a
Majority		1,266	4.3	4.9
Turnout			87.6	+4.5
Liberal gain from Unionist		Swing	+2.5	

Barrow-in-Furness
Party	Candidate	Votes	%	±%
Unionist	Daniel Somerville	13,996	47.5	
Labour	John Bromley	13,576	46.0	
Liberal	William Hood Wandless	1,931	6.5	
Majority		420	1.5	
Turnout			86.3	
Unionist hold		Swing		

Basingstoke
Party	Candidate	Votes	%	±%
Liberal	Reginald Fletcher	11,879	50.7	+20.3
Unionist	Arthur Holbrook	11,531	49.3	−6.7
Majority		348	1.4	27.0
Turnout			68.8	+1.9
Liberal gain from Unionist		Swing	+13.5	

Bassetlaw
Party	Candidate	Votes	%	±%
Unionist	Ellis Hume-Williams	10,419	42.3	
Liberal	Arthur Neal	7,247	29.4	
Labour	Malcolm Macdonald	6,973	28.3	
Majority		3,172	12.9	
Turnout			76.6	
Unionist hold		Swing		

Bath
Party	Candidate	Votes	%	±%
Liberal	Frank Raffety	13,694	51.6	+19.6
Unionist	Charles Foxcroft	12,830	48.4	−1.8
Majority		864	3.2	21.4
Turnout			79.1	−3.3
Liberal gain from Unionist		Swing	+10.7	

Batley and Morley
Party	Candidate	Votes	%	±%
Labour	Ben Turner	14,964	52.6	+6.5
Liberal	Walter Forrest	13,480	47.4	+18.3
Majority		1,484	5.2	−11.8
Turnout		28,444	73.8	−11.4
Labour hold		Swing	-5.9	

Bedford
Party	Candidate	Votes	%	±%
Unionist	Richard Wells	12,906	50.9	+0.6
Liberal	Milner Gray	12,449	49.1	+41.3
Majority		457	1.8	−27.1
Turnout			73.5	−5.6
Unionist hold		Swing	-20.4	

Bedfordshire Mid
Party	Candidate	Votes	%	±%
Liberal	Frederick Linfield	11,310	51.0	
Unionist	William Warner	9,287	41.9	
Labour	Robert Leonard Wigzell	1,567	7.1	n/a
Majority		2,023	9.1	−3.9
Turnout			72.6	
Liberal hold		Swing		

Belper
Party	Candidate	Votes	%	±%
Unionist	Herbert Wragg	9,662	41.8	n/a
Labour	Oliver Wright	7,284	31.5	−7.4
Liberal	John Hancock	6,178	26.7	−34.5
Majority		2,378	10.3	n/a
Turnout		23,124	70.0	+6.4
Unionist gain from Liberal		Swing	n/a	

Berwick-upon-Tweed
Party	Candidate	Votes	%	±%
Unionist	Mabel Philipson	10,636	48.0	n/a
Liberal	Harold Burge Robson	8,767	39.5	+1.4
Labour	Edna Martha Penny	2,784	12.5	n/a
Majority		1,869	8.5	n/a
Turnout			73.4	+7.2
Unionist hold		Swing	n/a	

Bewdley
Party	Candidate	Votes	%	±%
Unionist	Stanley Baldwin	12,395	67.3	+1.2
Liberal	Sardius Hancock	6,026	32.7	−1.2
Majority		6,369	34.6	+2.4
Turnout		18,421	68.8	+4.1
Unionist hold		Swing	+1.2	

Birkenhead East
Party	Candidate	Votes	%	±%
Liberal	Graham White	15,845	63.5	+5.7
Unionist	Luke Lees	9,091	36.5	−5.7
Majority		6,754	27.0	+11.4
Turnout			74.1	−3.4
Liberal hold		Swing	+5.7	

Birkenhead West
Party	Candidate	Votes	%	±%
Labour	William Henry Egan	12,473	55.8	+9.8
Unionist	William Henry Stott	9,862	44.2	−9.8
Majority		2,611	11.6	19.6
Turnout			72.4	−3.2
Labour gain from Unionist		Swing	+9.8	

Birmingham Aston
Party	Candidate	Votes	%	±%
Unionist	Evelyn Cecil	13,291	56.2	
Labour	P. Bower	7,541	31.8	
Liberal	Joseph Conyers Tillotson	2,846	12.0	
Majority		5,750	24.4	+2.8
Turnout			65.0	
Unionist hold		Swing	+1.4	

Birmingham Deritend
Party	Candidate	Votes	%	±%
Unionist	Smedley Crooke	12,015	56.1	+7.2
Labour	Fred Longden	9,396	43.9	+15.1
Majority		2,619	12.2	−7.9
Unionist hold		Swing	-3.9	

Birmingham Duddeston
Party	Candidate	Votes	%	±%
Unionist	John Burman	11,712	59.6	
Labour	George Francis Sawyer	7,309	37.2	
Independent	A. Ford	634	3.2	
Majority		4,403	22.4	−0.2
Turnout			56.9	
Unionist hold		Swing		

- Ford stood on a Free Trade platform

Birmingham Edgbaston
Party	Candidate	Votes	%	±%
Unionist	Francis Lowe	15,459	72.2	
Liberal	Alfred William Bowkett	5,962	27.8	n/a
Majority		9,497	44.4	
Turnout			56.7	
Unionist hold		Swing		

Birmingham Erdington
Party	Candidate	Votes	%	±%
Unionist	Arthur Steel-Maitland	14,683	66.0	n/a
Labour	Albert Edward Eyton	7,574	34.0	n/a
Majority		7,109	32.0	n/a
Turnout			59.4	n/a
Unionist hold		Swing	n/a	

Birmingham Handsworth
Party	Candidate	Votes	%	±%
Unionist	Oliver Locker-Lampson	unopposed	n/a	n/a
Unionist hold		Swing	n/a	

Birmingham Kings Norton
Party	Candidate	Votes	%	±%
Unionist	Herbert Austin	9,545	43.4	+1.8
Labour	Eleanor Barton	6,743	30.7	−2.1
Liberal	Elizabeth Cadbury	5,686	25.9	+0.3
Majority		2,802	12.7	+3.9
Turnout			74.1	+0.1
Unionist hold		Swing	+2.0	

Birmingham Ladywood
Party	Candidate	Votes	%	±%
Unionist	Neville Chamberlain	12,884	53.2	−2.0
Labour	Robert Dunstan	11,330	46.8	+2.0
Majority		1,554	6.4	−4.0
Turnout			72.0	+1.5
Unionist hold		Swing	-2.0	

Birmingham Moseley
Party	Candidate	Votes	%	±%
Unionist	Patrick Hannon	19,628	71.3	n/a
Liberal	Janet Clarkson	7,904	28.7	n/a
Majority		11,724	42.6	n/a
Turnout			63.1	n/a
Unionist hold		Swing	n/a	

Birmingham Sparkbrook
Party	Candidate	Votes	%	±%
Unionist	Leo Amery	13,523	56.0	+6.5
Labour	Ernest Walter Hampton	5,948	24.6	+1.2
Liberal	Donald Finnemore	4,676	19.4	−7.7
Majority		7,575	31.4	−10.6
Turnout			63.7	−7.3
Unionist hold		Swing	-5.3	

Birmingham West
Party	Candidate	Votes	%	±%
Unionist	Austen Chamberlain	13,940	58.3	−3.3
Labour	Frank Samuel Smith	9,983	41.7	+3.3
Majority		3,957	16.6	−6.6
Turnout			63.9	
Unionist hold		Swing	-3.3	

Birmingham Yardley
Party	Candidate	Votes	%	±%
Unionist	Alfred Jephcott	13,300	53.5	−4.6
Labour	Archibald Gossling	11,562	46.5	+4.6
Majority		1,738	7.0	−9.2
Turnout			64.4	
Unionist hold		Swing	-4.6	

Bishop Auckland
Party	Candidate	Votes	%	±%
Labour	Ben Spoor	13,328	51.2	−2.5
Liberal	John Bainbridge	6,686	25.7	n/a
Unionist	Robert Gee	6,024	23.1	n/a
Majority		6,642	25.5	
Turnout			7.5	
Labour hold		Swing	n/a	

Blackburn (2 seats)
Party	Candidate	Votes	%	±%
Liberal	John Duckworth	31,117	29.1	n/a
Unionist	Sydney Henn	28,505	26.6	+1.1
Labour	John Davies	25,428	23.8	+2.1
Labour	Edward Porter	21,903	20.5	−0.6
Turnout			85.0	−3.4
Majority		3,077	2.8	+0.1
Unionist hold		Swing	+0.0	
Majority		5,689	5.3	
Liberal hold		Swing	n/a	

Blackpool
Party	Candidate	Votes	%	±%
Liberal	Hugh Meyler	22,264	53.7	+3.9
Unionist	Victor Stanley	19,192	46.3	−3.9
Majority		3,072	7.4	7.8
Turnout			84.8	+6.5
Liberal gain from Unionist		Swing	+3.9	

Blaydon
Party	Candidate	Votes	%	±%
Labour	William Whiteley	15,073	67.9	+14.0
Unionist	George Denson	7,124	32.1	+2.9
Majority		7,949	35.8	+11.1
Turnout			62.1	−14.9
Labour hold		Swing	+5.5	

Bodmin
Party	Candidate	Votes	%	±%
Liberal	Isaac Foot	14,536	53.6	+0.2
Unionist	Frederick Poole	12,574	46.4	−0.2
Majority		1,962	7.2	+0.4
Turnout			82.0	+1.6
Liberal hold		Swing	+0.2	

Bolton (2 seats)
Party	Candidate	Votes	%	±%
Labour	Albert Law	25,133	18.6	
Unionist	Herbert Cunliffe	22,833	16.9	
Unionist	Cecil Hilton	22,640	16.8	
Liberal	William Edge	22,173	16.5	
Labour	Fleming Eccles	21,045	15.6	
Liberal	John Fletcher Steele	21,040	15.6	+1.1
Turnout			80.0	
Majority		660	0.4	
Unionist hold		Swing		
Majority		2,493	1.8	
Labour gain from Liberal		Swing		

Bootle
Party	Candidate	Votes	%	±%
Liberal	James Burnie	10,444	44.1	−12.2
Unionist	Vivian Henderson	9,991	42.1	+0.2
Labour	John Kinley	3,272	13.8	n/a
Majority		453	2.0	−12.4
Turnout		23,707	68.1	−3.0
Liberal hold		Swing	-6.2	

Bosworth
Party	Candidate	Votes	%	±%
Liberal	George Ward	11,596	41.2	+
Unionist	Guy Paget	8,430	29.9	−
Labour	E. Hughes	8,152	28.9	
Majority		3,166	11.3	
Turnout			80.3	

Bournemouth
Party	Candidate	Votes	%	±%
Unionist	Henry Page Croft	15,506	50.4	−1.9
Liberal	Cyril Berkeley Dallow	9,256	30.1	−3.8
Labour	Minnie Pallister	5,986	19.5	n/a
Majority		6,250	20.3	
Turnout			79.0	
Unionist hold		Swing	+1.0	

Bradford Central
Party	Candidate	Votes	%	±%
Labour	William Leach	14,241	44.6	+1.8
Unionist	Jonas Pearson	9,725	30.4	−5.7
Liberal	William Paxton	7,973	25.0	+3.5
Majority		4,516	14.2	+7.9
Turnout		31,939	71.0	−4.4
Labour hold		Swing	+3.7	

Bradford East
Party	Candidate	Votes	%	±%
Labour	Fred Jowett	13,579	48.1	+2.7
Liberal	Eckersley Mitchell	8,017	28.4	+7.0
Unionist	James Clare	6,622	23.5	n/a
Majority		5,562	19.7	+7.5
Turnout			75.6	−5.8
Labour hold		Swing	-2.2	

Bradford North
Party	Candidate	Votes	%	±%
Liberal	Walter Rea	9,365	34.0	+2.0
Unionist	Archibald Boyd-Carpenter	9,192	33.3	−3.2
Labour	Thomas Blythe	9,036	32.7	+1.2
Majority		173	0.7	+5.2
Turnout			81.7	−2.3
Liberal gain from Unionist		Swing	+2.6	

Bradford South
Party	Candidate	Votes	%	±%
Liberal	Herbert Harvey Spencer	12,218	37.0	−1.0
Labour	William Hirst	11,543	34.9	−0.4
Unionist	George Mitcheson	9,270	28.1	+1.4
Majority		675	2.1	−0.6
Turnout			76.9	−5.3
Liberal hold		Swing	-0.3	

Brentford & Chiswick
Party	Candidate	Votes	%	±%
Unionist	Walter Grant Morden	9,648	54.5	
Independent	Ray Strachey	4,828	27.3	
Labour	William Haywood	3,216	18.2	
Majority		4,820	27.2	
Turnout			62.6	
Unionist hold		Swing		

Bridgwater
Party	Candidate	Votes	%	±%
Liberal	William Morse	13,778	52.7	+6.3
Unionist	Robert Sanders	12,347	47.3	+0.4
Majority		1,431	5.4	5.9
Turnout				
Liberal gain from Unionist		Swing	+3.0	

Brigg
Party	Candidate	Votes	%	±%
Unionist	Berkeley Sheffield	12,412	53.6	
Labour	David Quibell	10,753	46.4	
Majority		1,659	7.2	
Turnout			72.8	
Unionist hold		Swing		

Brighton (2 seats)
Party	Candidate	Votes	%	±%
Unionist	George Tryon	30,137	26.8	−5.2
Unionist	Cooper Rawson	29,759	26.5	−3.5
Liberal	Walter Runciman	17,462	15.5	−9.2
Liberal	Henry Lunn	16,567	14.7	n/a
Labour	Alban Gordon	9,545	8.5	n/a
Labour	Herbert Carden	9,040	8.0	n/a
Majority		12,297	11.0	+5.7
Turnout			69.3	−0.8
Unionist hold		Swing	+2.8	

Bristol Central
Party	Candidate	Votes	%	±%
Unionist	Thomas Inskip	14,386	54.7	−1.2
Labour	Samuel Edward Walters	11,932	45.3	+1.2
Majority		2,454	9.3	−2.4
Unionist hold		Swing	-1.2	

Bristol East
Party	Candidate	Votes	%	±%
Labour	Walter Baker	14,824	53.7	+4.0
Liberal	Harold Morris	12,788	46.3	−4.0
Majority		2,036	7.4	8.0
Labour gain from Liberal		Swing	+4.0	

Bristol North
Party	Candidate	Votes	%	±%
Labour	Walter Ayles	10,433	37.5	+1.9
Liberal	Henry Guest	8,770	31.5	−33.1
Unionist	Ernest Petter	8,643	31.0	n/a
Majority		1,663	6.0	35.0
Labour gain from Liberal		Swing	+17.5	

Bristol South
Party	Candidate	Votes	%	±%
Liberal	Beddoe Rees	15,235	52.7	−3.5
Labour	David Vaughan	13,701	47.3	+3.5
Majority		1,534	5.3	−7.0
Liberal hold		Swing	-3.5	

Bristol West
Party	Candidate	Votes	%	±%
Unionist	George Gibbs	Unopposed	n/a	n/a
Unionist hold		Swing	n/a	

Bromley
Party	Candidate	Votes	%	±%
Unionist	Cuthbert James	13,495	44.8	−10.0
Liberal	F. Kingsley Griffith	12,612	41.9	+12.1
Labour	Glenvil Hall	3,992	13.3	−2.1
Majority		883	2.9	−22.1
Turnout			64.1	−2.2
Unionist hold		Swing	-11.1	

Broxtowe
Party	Candidate	Votes	%	±%
Labour	George Spencer	13,219	54.5	
Liberal	George Julian Selwyn Scovell	11,049	45.5	
Majority		2,170	9.0	
Turnout			62.0	
Labour hold		Swing		

Buckingham
Party	Candidate	Votes	%	±%
Unionist	George Bowyer	13,351	53.0	+3.6
Labour	E. J. Pay	11,824	47.0	+20.7
Majority		1,527	6.0	−17.1
Turnout			68.4	–
Unionist hold		Swing	-8.5	

Buckrose
Party	Candidate	Votes	%	±%
Unionist	Guy Gaunt	12,336	50.4	−0.9
Liberal	Thomas Fenby	12,122	49.6	+0.9
Majority		214	0.8	−1.8
Turnout			84.1	+1.6
Unionist hold		Swing	-0.9	

Burnley
Party	Candidate	Votes	%	±%
Labour	Dan Irving	16,848	37.8	−1.3
Unionist	Harold Edward Joscelyn Camps	14,197	31.8	−1.3
Liberal	James Whitehead	13,543	30.4	+2.6
Majority		2,651	6.0	0.0
Turnout			87.3	
Labour hold		Swing	0.0	

Burslem
Party	Candidate	Votes	%	±%
Liberal	William Edward Robinson	12,543	50.1	
Labour	Andrew MacLaren	12,480	49.9	
Majority		63	0.2	
Turnout				
Liberal gain from Labour		Swing		

Burton
Party	Candidate	Votes	%	±%
Unionist	John Gretton	unopposed	n/a	n/a
Unionist hold		Swing	n/a	

Bury
Party	Candidate	Votes	%	±%
Unionist	Charles Ainsworth	10,680	40.3	−0.9
Labour	Harry Wallace	9,568	36.1	−0.6
Liberal	James Duckworth	6,251	23.6	+1.5
Majority		1,112	4.2	−0.3
Turnout			80.8	−0.5
Unionist hold		Swing	-0.1	

Bury St Edmunds
Party	Candidate	Votes	%	±%
Unionist	Walter Guinness	unopposed	63.0	n/a
Unionist hold		Swing	n/a	

Camborne
Party	Candidate	Votes	%	±%
Independent Liberal	Leifchild Leif-Jones	11,794	59.3	+20.9
Liberal	Algernon Moreing	8,096	40.7	+1.0
Majority		3,698	18.6	19.9
Turnout			58.0	−2.5
Independent Liberal gain from Liberal		Swing	+10.0	

- The local Liberal Association was unable to agree to a candidate, but Moreing was recognised as the official candidate by Liberal Party HQ. Upon election, Jones took the Liberal whip.

Cambridge
Party	Candidate	Votes	%	±%
Unionist	George Newton	9,814	42.0	−6.7
Liberal	Sydney Cope Morgan	7,852	33.5	+3.1
Labour	Alec Sandy Firth	5,741	24.5	+3.6
Majority		1,962	8.5	−9.8
Turnout			80.9	−0.3
Unionist hold		Swing	-4.9	

Cambridgeshire
Party	Candidate	Votes	%	±%
Unionist	Richard Briscoe	11,710	43.6	+5.6
Labour	A. E. Stubbs	8,554	31.8	−3.5
Liberal	Elsbeth Dimsdale	6,619	24.6	−2.1
Majority		3,156	11.8	+9.1
Turnout		26,883	72.5	+1.7
Unionist hold		Swing	+4.6	

Cannock
Party	Candidate	Votes	%	±%
Labour	William Adamson	11,956	41.4	
Unionist	Wallace Thorneycroft	9,438	32.7	
Liberal	Geoffrey Mander	7,465	25.9	
Majority		2,518	8.7	
Turnout		28,859		
Labour hold		Swing		

Canterbury
Party	Candidate	Votes	%	±%
Unionist	Ronald McNeill	12,017	58.4	
Liberal	William Robertson Heatley	8,561	41.6	
Majority		3,456	16.8	
Turnout			59.3	
Unionist hold		Swing		

Carlisle
Party	Candidate	Votes	%	±%
Labour	George Middleton	9,120	40.5	+2.9
Unionist	William Watson	8,844	39.3	+8.6
Liberal	Richard Denman	4,541	20.2	−11.5
Majority		276	1.2	−5.1
Turnout			87.8	+3.8
Labour hold		Swing	-2.8	

Chatham
Party	Candidate	Votes	%	±%
Unionist	John Moore-Brabazon	9,994	41.6	−9.9
Liberal	Alfred John Callaghan	8,227	34.3	−14.2
Labour	Mary Hamilton	5,794	24.1	n/a
Majority		1,767	7.3	+4.3
Turnout			74.6	
Unionist hold		Swing	+2.1	

Chelmsford
Party	Candidate	Votes	%	±%
Liberal	Sydney Robinson	12,877	55.8	+26.0
Unionist	E. G. Pretyman	10,185	44.2	−8.4
Majority		2,692	11.6	34.4
Turnout			63.5	+2.5
Liberal gain from Unionist		Swing	+17.2	

Cheltenham
Party	Candidate	Votes	%	±%
Unionist	James Agg-Gardner	10,514	53.4	−4.6
Liberal	Cuthbert Plaistowe	9,170	46.6	+4.6
Majority		1,344	6.8	−9.2
Turnout			79.5	−2.3
Unionist hold		Swing	-4.6	

Chertsey
Party	Candidate	Votes	%	±%
Unionist	Philip Richardson	13,333	55.5	−4.9
Liberal	Reginald John Marnham	10,694	44.5	+4.9
Majority		2,639	11.0	−9.8
Turnout			60.1	+1.9
Unionist hold		Swing	-4.9	

Chester
Party	Candidate	Votes	%	±%
Unionist	Charles Cayzer	9,985	45.4	−8.7
Liberal	William Craven Llewelyn	6,212	28.3	+7.0
Labour	George Muff	5,773	26.3	+1.7
Majority		3,773	17.1	−15.7
Turnout			78.6	−2.6
Unionist hold		Swing	-7.9	

Chesterfield
Party	Candidate	Votes	%	±%
Liberal	Barnet Kenyon	12,164	50.9	n/a
Labour	George Benson	6,198	25.9	n/a
Unionist	R F H Broomhead-Colton-Fox	5,541	23.2	n/a
Majority		5,966	25.0	n/a
Turnout		23,903		n/a
Liberal hold		Swing	n/a	

Chester-le-Street
Party	Candidate	Votes	%	±%
Labour	Jack Lawson	20,712	74.7	
Unionist	Charles Harris	7,015	25.3	
Majority		13,697	49.4	
Turnout				
Labour hold		Swing		

Chichester
Party	Candidate	Votes	%	±%
Liberal	Charles Rudkin	14,513	52.1	n/a
Unionist	William Bird	13,348	47.9	
Majority		1,165	4.2	
Turnout		27,861		
Liberal gain from Unionist		Swing	n/a	

Chippenham
Party	Candidate	Votes	%	±%
Liberal	Alfred Bonwick	11,953	51.7	+3.1
Unionist	Victor Cazalet	11,156	48.3	+2.0
Majority		797	3.4	+1.1
Turnout			81.6	+3.6
Liberal hold		Swing	+0.6	

Chislehurst
Party	Candidate	Votes	%	±%
Unionist	Robert Nesbitt	9,725	55.5	−9.9
Liberal	Robert Charles Reginald Nevill	7,806	44.5	+9.9
Majority		1,919	11.0	−19.8
Turnout			60.5	−3.2
Unionist hold		Swing	-9.9	

Chorley
Party	Candidate	Votes	%	±%
Unionist	Douglas Hacking	14,715	54.7	n/a
Labour	Zeph Hutchinson	12,179	45.3	n/a
Majority		2,536	9.4	n/a
Turnout			74.4	n/a
Unionist hold		Swing	n/a	

Cirencester and Tewkesbury
Party	Candidate	Votes	%	±%
Unionist	Thomas Davies	15,406	66.2	+2.0
Labour	William Robert Robins	7,849	33.8	−2.0
Majority		7,557	32.4	+4.0
Turnout			63.6	−7.7
Unionist hold		Swing	+2.0	

Clay Cross
Party	Candidate	Votes	%	±%
Labour	Charles Duncan	11,939	56.0	
Unionist	John Sherwood-Kelly	4,881	22.9	
Liberal	Frank Thornborough	4,488	21.1	
Majority		7,058	33.1	
Turnout			61.4	
Labour hold		Swing		

Cleveland
Party	Candidate	Votes	%	±%
Liberal	Charles Starmer	13,326	38.2	+5.4
Unionist	Park Goff	11,855	34.0	−3.7
Labour	Robert Dennison	9,683	27.8	−1.7
Majority		1,471	4.2	9.1
Turnout			80.4	
Liberal gain from Unionist		Swing	+4.6	

Clitheroe
Party	Candidate	Votes	%	±%
Unionist	William Brass	12,998	42.9	−11.8
Labour	Alfred Davies	11,469	37.9	−7.4
Liberal	Harold Derbyshire	5,810	19.2	n/a
Majority		1,529	5.0	−4.4
Turnout			88.2	
Unionist hold		Swing	-2.2	

Colchester
Party	Candidate	Votes	%	±%
Unionist	Laming Worthington-Evans	10,535	43.4	−13.3
Labour	Richard Reiss	8,316	34.2	−9.1
Liberal	Arthur Horne Goldfinch	5,430	22.4	n/a
Majority		2,219	9.2	−4.2
Turnout			78.2	
Unionist hold		Swing	-2.1	

Colne Valley
Party	Candidate	Votes	%	±%
Labour	Philip Snowden	13,136	40.4	
Unionist	Thomas Brooke	11,215	34.4	
Liberal	Percy Holt Heffer	8,223	25.2	
Majority		1,921	6.0	
Turnout			79.0	
Labour hold		Swing		

Consett
Party	Candidate	Votes	%	±%
Labour	Herbert Dunnico	15,862	52.0	+5.5
Liberal	Ursula Williams	14,619	48.0	+16.2
Majority		1,243	4.0	10.7
Turnout			78.2	−3.8
Labour hold		Swing	-5.4	

North Cornwall
Party	Candidate	Votes	%	±%
Liberal	George Marks	12,434	56.5	n/a
Unionist	Charles Alexander Petrie	9,581	43.5	n/a
Majority		2,853	13.0	n/a
Turnout		22,015	75.6	n/a
Liberal hold		Swing	n/a	

Coventry
Party	Candidate	Votes	%	±%
Labour	A. A. Purcell	16,346	34.2	+1.1
Unionist	Edward Manville	15,726	32.9	−9.7
Liberal	Henry Paterson Gisborne	15,716	32.9	+8.6
Majority		620	1.3	10.8
Turnout			77.1	−3.7
Labour gain from Unionist		Swing	+5.4	

Crewe
Party	Candidate	Votes	%	±%
Labour	Edward Hemmerde	14,628	46.5	−4.4
Unionist	Thomas Strangman	8,734	27.8	n/a
Liberal	Robert Mortimer Montgomery	8,068	25.7	n/a
Majority		5,894	18.7	
Turnout			82.8	
Labour hold		Swing	n/a	

Croydon North
Party	Candidate	Votes	%	±%
Unionist	Glyn Mason	17,085	63.0	n/a
Labour	Gilbert Arthur Foan	10,054	37.0	n/a
Majority		7,031	26.0	n/a
Turnout			55.7	n/a
Unionist hold		Swing	n/a	

Croydon South
Party	Candidate	Votes	%	±%
Unionist	William Mitchell-Thomson	14,310	45.5	−1.8
Labour	H.T. Muggeridge	9,926	31.6	+4.1
Liberal	Wynne Cemlyn-Jones	7,208	22.9	−2.3
Majority		4,384	13.9	−5.9
Turnout			63.4	−3.0
Unionist hold		Swing	-3.0	

Cumberland North
Party	Candidate	Votes	%	±%
Unionist	Donald Howard	9,288	50.6	−0.2
Liberal	Richard Durning Holt	9,070	49.4	+0.2
Majority		218	1.2	−0.4
Turnout			83.2	+3.3
Unionist hold		Swing	-0.2	

Darlington
Party	Candidate	Votes	%	±%
Unionist	William Edwin Pease	11,638	42.2	−7.5
Labour	William John Sherwood	9,284	33.6	−0.2
Liberal	Robert Wright	6,697	24.2	+7.7
Majority		2,354	8.6	−7.3
Turnout			86.8	−1.2
Unionist hold		Swing	-3.6	

Dartford
Party	Candidate	Votes	%	±%
Labour	John Edmund Mills	18,329	54.2	+10.3
Constitutionalist	George Jarrett	15,500	45.8	−3.8
Majority		2,829	8.4	14.1
Turnout			70.0	−1.2
Labour gain from National Liberal		Swing	+7.0	

Darwen
Party	Candidate	Votes	%	±%
Liberal	Frederick Hindle	14,242	48.8	+7.2
Unionist	Frank Sanderson	11,432	39.1	−3.5
Labour	George Thompson	3,527	12.1	−6.1
Majority		2,810	9.7	10.7
Turnout			90.6	−0.8
Liberal gain from Unionist		Swing	+5.4	

Daventry
Party	Candidate	Votes	%	±%
Unionist	Edward FitzRoy	10,514	44.6	–
Liberal	Charles Kerr	8,914	37.8	n/a
Labour	Leonard Smith	4,127	17.5	−
Majority		1,600	6.8	
Turnout		23,555		
Unionist hold		Swing	n/a	

Derby (2 seats)
Party	Candidate	Votes	%	±%
Labour	J. H. Thomas	24,887	29.0	+2.0
Labour	William Raynes	20,318	23.7	+0.4
Unionist	Henry Fitz-Herbert Wright	20,070	23.4	−0.5
Liberal	Charles Roberts	10,669	12.5	−13.3
Ind. Unionist	Thomas Clifford Newbold	9,772	11.4	n/a
Turnout			81.1	−2.9
Majority		248	0.3	2.2
Labour gain from Liberal		Swing	+6.8	

Derbyshire North East
Party	Candidate	Votes	%	±%
Labour	Frank Lee	10,971	39.5	+5.6
Unionist	Charles Waterhouse	8,768	31.5	−0.7
Liberal	Philip Guedalla	8,080	29.0	−4.9
Majority		2,203	8.0	+8.0
Turnout		27,819	75.8	−1.5
Labour hold		Swing	+3.1	

Derbyshire South
Party	Candidate	Votes	%	±%
Unionist	Henry Lorimer	12,902	38.5	−4.1
Labour	Alfred Goodere	10,919	32.7	+3.1
Liberal	Gilbert Stone	9,620	28.8	+1.0
Majority		1,983	5.8	−7.2
Turnout			75.7	−4.1
Unionist hold		Swing	-3.6	

Derbyshire West
Party	Candidate	Votes	%	±%
Unionist	Edward Cavendish	13,419	50.9	+1.1
Liberal	William Christopher Mallison	12,966	49.1	−1.1
Majority		453	1.8	2.2
Turnout			84.9	−1.2
Unionist gain from Liberal		Swing	+1.1	

Devizes
Party	Candidate	Votes	%	±%
Liberal	Eric Macfadyen	9,202	51.8	+11.1
Unionist	Cory Bell	8,574	48.2	−11.1
Majority		628	3.6	22.2
Turnout			69.5	+4.6
Liberal gain from Unionist		Swing	+11.1	

Dewsbury
Party	Candidate	Votes	%	±%
Liberal	Edmund Harvey	11,179	55.6	+21.5
Labour	Ben Riley	8,923	44.4	+7.0
Majority		2,256	11.2	14.5
Turnout			70.7	−13.3
Liberal gain from Labour		Swing	+7.3	

Doncaster
Party	Candidate	Votes	%	±%
Labour	Wilfred Paling	16,198	60.6	
Unionist	William Warde-Aldam	10,514	39.4	
Majority		5,684	21.2	
Turnout			68.4	
Labour hold		Swing		

Don Valley
Party	Candidate	Votes	%	±%
Labour	Tom Williams	12,898	60.4	+13.4
Unionist	John Wells Reynolds	8,451	39.6	n/a
Majority		4,447	20.8	+1.4
Turnout			62.2	−3.2
Labour hold		Swing	n/a	

Dorset East
Party	Candidate	Votes	%	±%
Unionist	Gordon Hall Caine	12,480	48.5	−0.6
Liberal	Richard Evan Williams Kirby	7,535	29.2	+2.1
Labour	Frederick Jesse Hopkins	5,760	22.3	−1.5
Majority		4,945	19.3	−2.7
Turnout			78.5	−1.7
Unionist hold		Swing	-1.4	

Dorset North
Party	Candidate	Votes	%	±%
Liberal	John Emlyn-Jones	10,992	51.8	−0.5
Unionist	Cecil Hanbury	10,211	48.2	+0.5
Majority		781	3.6	−1.0
Turnout			84.3	
Liberal hold		Swing	-0.5	

Dorset South
Party	Candidate	Votes	%	±%
Unionist	Robert Yerburgh	11,057	53.5	−3.7
Liberal	Robert Stone Comben	5,973	29.0	+7.0
Labour	David Wyndham Thomas	3,602	17.5	−3.3
Majority		5,084	24.5	−10.7
Turnout			71.6	−3.6
Unionist hold		Swing	-5.4	

Dorset West
Party	Candidate	Votes	%	±%
Unionist	Philip Colfox	10,100	58.8	−3.3
Labour	Louie Simpson	7,087	41.2	+3.3
Majority		3,013	17.6	−6.6
Turnout			70.9	−7.6
Unionist hold		Swing	-3.3	

Dover
Party	Candidate	Votes	%	±%
Unionist	John Jacob Astor	unopposed	n/a	n/a
Unionist hold		Swing	n/a	

Dudley
Party	Candidate	Votes	%	±%
Unionist	Cyril Lloyd	10,227	49.4	−10.8
Liberal	Francis James Ballard	8,510	41.1	n/a
Labour	Richard Fowler Smith	1,958	9.5	−30.3
Majority		1,717	8.3	−12.1
Turnout			78.9	−3.6
Unionist hold		Swing	n/a	

Durham
Party	Candidate	Votes	%	±%
Labour	Joshua Ritson	13,819	56.8	+1.6
Unionist	Thomas Andrew Bradford	10,530	43.2	−1.6
Majority		3,289	13.6	+3.2
Turnout			80.1	+2.9
Labour hold		Swing	+1.6	

Ealing
Party	Candidate	Votes	%	±%
Unionist	Herbert Nield	12,349	53.1	−14.8
Liberal	Alfred William Bradford	6,410	27.6	n/a
Labour	Alfred Hugh Chilton	4,495	19.3	−9.4
Majority		5,939	25.5	−13.7
Turnout			69.0	+3.2
Unionist hold		Swing	n/a	

Eastbourne
Party	Candidate	Votes	%	±%
Unionist	Rupert Gwynne	13,276	53.8	−6.7
Liberal	Thomas Wiles	11,396	46.2	+6.7
Majority		1,880	7.6	−13.4
Turnout			77.0	−0.2
Unionist hold		Swing	-6.7	

East Grinstead
Party	Candidate	Votes	%	±%
Unionist	Henry Cautley	14,215	68.8	−2.2
Labour	Thomas Crawford	6,451	31.2	+2.2
Majority		7,764	37.6	−4.4
Turnout			52.4	−5.8
Unionist hold		Swing	-2.2	

East Ham North
Party	Candidate	Votes	%	±%
Labour	Susan Lawrence	8,727	35.7	+7.9
Liberal	Ernest Edwards	8,311	34.0	+27.8
Unionist	Charles Crook	7,393	30.3	+0.6
Majority		416	1.7	
Turnout		24,431	69.0	−0.8
Labour gain from Unionist		Swing		

East Ham South
Party	Candidate	Votes	%	±%
Labour	Alfred Barnes	11,402	49.2	+1.1
Liberal	Edward Smallwood	8,772	37.8	+7.8
Unionist	Herbert Joseph Ward	3,011	13.0	n/a
Majority		2,630	11.4	−6.7
Turnout			68.5	+2.2
Labour hold		Swing	-3.4	

Eccles
Party	Candidate	Votes	%	±%
Labour	John Buckle	12,267	42.7	−8.7
Unionist	Marshall Stevens	10,364	36.2	−12.4
Liberal	William Sandiford Ashton	6,011	21.0	n/a
Majority		1,863	6.5	+3.7
Labour hold		Swing	+1.8	

Eddisbury
Party	Candidate	Votes	%	±%
Unionist	Harry Barnston	8,716	50.6	n/a
Liberal	R. J. Russell	8,520	49.4	n/a
Majority		196	1.2	n/a
Turnout			76.4	n/a
Unionist hold		Swing	n/a	

Edmonton
Party	Candidate	Votes	%	±%
Labour	Frank Broad	10,735	64.4	+19.3
Unionist	Robert Skirving Brown	5,943	35.6	−0.4
Majority		4,792	28.8	+19.7
Turnout			54.8	–
Labour hold		Swing	+9.8	

Elland
Party	Candidate	Votes	%	±%
Liberal	Robert Kay	12,476	50.9	+15.6
Labour	William C. Robinson	12,031	49.1	+12.3
Majority		445	1.8	+0.3
Turnout			70.0	−11.9
Liberal gain from Labour		Swing	+1.7	

Enfield
Party	Candidate	Votes	%	±%
Labour	William Henderson	11,050	52.8	+7.2
Unionist	Thomas Fermor-Hesketh	9,888	47.2	−7.2
Majority		1,162	5.6	14.4
Turnout			68.5	
Labour gain from Unionist		Swing	+7.2	

Epping
Party	Candidate	Votes	%	±%
Unionist	Leonard Lyle	14,528	52.9	−7.0
Liberal	Gilbert Granville Sharp	12,954	47.1	+7.0
Majority		1,574	5.8	−14.0
Turnout			66.4	+2.9
Unionist hold		Swing	-7.0	

Epsom
Party	Candidate	Votes	%	±%
Unionist	Rowland Blades	14,230	71.0	
Labour	John Langdon-Davies	5,807	29.0	
Majority		8,423	42.0	
Turnout			55.6	
Unionist hold		Swing		

Essex South East
Party	Candidate	Votes	%	±%
Labour	Philip Hoffman	13,979	53.0	
Unionist	Frank Hilder	12,379	47.0	
Majority		1,600	6.0	
Turnout			58.1	
Labour gain from Unionist		Swing		

Evesham
Party	Candidate	Votes	%	±%
Unionist	Bolton Eyres-Monsell	10,976	54.5	−5.4
Liberal	William Henry Collett	5,453	27.1	n/a
Labour	Robert Aldington	3,705	18.4	−21.7
Majority		5,523	27.4	
Turnout			67.7	
Unionist hold		Swing		

Exeter
Party	Candidate	Votes	%	±%
Unionist	Robert Newman	14,908	67.7	+11.0
Labour	Lothian Small	7,123	32.3	n/a
Majority		7,785	35.4	+22.0
Turnout			72.6	−13.0
Unionist hold		Swing	n/a	

Eye
Party	Candidate	Votes	%	±%
Unionist	William Vanneck	11,172	47.7	
Liberal	Alexander Lyle-Samuel	9,244	39.5	
Labour	Charles Wye Kendall	2,984	12.8	n/a
Majority		1,928	8.2	
Turnout			70.9	
Unionist gain from Liberal		Swing		

=== F to K ===
Fareham
Party	Candidate	Votes	%	±%
Unionist	John Davidson	14,787	69.4	
Labour	Joseph Bowron Baker	6,526	30.6	
Majority		8,261	38.8	
Turnout			59.7	
Unionist hold		Swing		

Farnham
Party	Candidate	Votes	%	±%
Unionist	Arthur Samuel	12,534	59.6	−13.7
Liberal	Christopher a'Beckett Williams	4,979	23.7	n/a
Labour	Anne Elizabeth Corner	3,520	16.7	−10.0
Majority		7,555	35.9	−10.7
Turnout			59.6	+2.8
Unionist hold		Swing	n/a	

Farnworth
Party	Candidate	Votes	%	±%
Labour	Thomas Greenall	14,858	57.2	
Unionist	Alexander Worsthorne	11,134	42.8	
Majority		3,724	14.4	
Turnout			73.5	
Labour hold		Swing		

Faversham
Party	Candidate	Votes	%	±%
Unionist	Granville Wheler	13,422	52.1	
Labour	Stanley James Wells Morgan	12,361	47.9	
Majority		1,061	4.2	
Turnout			63.4	
Unionist hold		Swing		

Finchley
Party	Candidate	Votes	%	±%
Liberal	T. Atholl Robertson	13,159	54.7	+7.9
Unionist	John Pretyman Newman	10,883	45.3	−7.9
Majority		2,276	9.4	15.8
Turnout			76.0	+3.6
Liberal gain from Unionist		Swing	+7.9	

Forest of Dean
Party	Candidate	Votes	%	±%
Labour	James Wignall	11,486	60.9	+8.5
Unionist	Augustus George Cuthbert Dinnick	7,383	39.1	+10.2
Majority		4,103	21.8	−1.7
Turnout			64.7	−7.3
Labour hold		Swing	-0.9	

Frome
Party	Candidate	Votes	%	±%
Labour	Frederick Gould	15,902	54.4	+6.6
Unionist	Percy Hurd	13,306	45.6	−6.6
Majority		2,596	8.8	+13.2
Turnout			79.7	−2.5
Labour gain from Unionist		Swing	+6.6	

Fylde
Party	Candidate	Votes	%	±%
Unionist	Edward Stanley	16,510	55.5	n/a
Liberal	R. Parkinson Tomlinson	13,230	44.5	n/a
Majority		3,280	11.0	n/a
Turnout		29,740		n/a
Unionist hold		Swing	n/a	

Gainsborough
Party	Candidate	Votes	%	±%
Liberal	Richard Winfrey	9,694	47.1	
Unionist	John Molson	7,841	38.1	
Labour	James Read	3,039	14.8	
Majority		1,853	9.0	
Turnout		20,574	75.4	
Liberal gain from Unionist		Swing		

Gateshead
Party	Candidate	Votes	%	±%
Liberal	John Dickie	17,344	42.7	+17.8
Labour	John Brotherton	16,689	41.1	−2.7
Unionist	George Francis Stephen Christie	6,592	16.2	−15.1
Majority		655	1.6	20.5
Turnout			73.2	−5.2
Liberal gain from Labour		Swing	+10.3	

Gillingham
Party	Candidate	Votes	%	±%
Unionist	Gerald Hohler	10,426	47.1	−11.0
Labour	Maurice Spencer	7,674	34.7	−7.2
Liberal	George Herbert Bryans	4,015	18.2	n/a
Majority		2,752	12.4	−3.8
Turnout			73.9	
Unionist hold		Swing	-1.9	

Gloucester
Party	Candidate	Votes	%	±%
Unionist	James Horlick	8,630	37.9	
Labour	M. Philips Price	8,127	35.7	
Liberal	Arthur Stanton	6,011	26.4	
Majority		503	2.2	
Turnout			86.5	
Unionist hold		Swing		

Grantham
Party	Candidate	Votes	%	±%
Unionist	Victor Warrender	12,552	43.5	+3.7
Liberal	Robert Pattinson	10,819	37.6	−3.8
Labour	Montague William Moore	5,440	18.9	+0.1
Majority		1,733	5.9	7.5
Turnout			79.1	−0.4
Unionist gain from Liberal		Swing	+3.7	

Gravesend
Party	Candidate	Votes	%	±%
Labour	George Isaacs	9,776	43.4	+7.8
Unionist	Alexander Richardson	9,657	42.8	+2.2
Liberal	Laurence Harry Duniam Jones	3,123	13.8	n/a
Majority		119	0.6	n/a
Turnout		22,556	68.8	+5.8
Labour gain from Unionist		Swing	+2.9	

Great Yarmouth
Party	Candidate	Votes	%	±%
Liberal	Arthur Harbord	11,416	51.8	+5.7
Unionist	James Allan Horne	8,492	38.5	−3.3
Labour	Albert Wrigley	2,138	9.7	−2.4
Majority		2,924	13.3	+9.0
Turnout			79.2	+0.2
Liberal hold		Swing	+4.5	

Grimsby
Party	Candidate	Votes	%	±%
Unionist	Tom Sutcliffe	17,577	52.4	
Labour	Charles Edwin Franklin	15,959	47.6	
Majority		1,618	4.8	
Turnout			62.2	
Unionist hold		Swing		

Guildford
Party	Candidate	Votes	%	±%
Unionist	Henry Buckingham	14,117	52.3	−18.3
Liberal	Samuel Parnell Kerr	7,601	28.2	n/a
Labour	William Bennett	5,260	19.5	−9.9
Majority		6,516	24.2	−17.0
Turnout			67.6	+2.2
Unionist hold		Swing	n/a	

Halifax
Party	Candidate	Votes	%	±%
Speaker	John Henry Whitley	unopposed	n/a	n/a
Speaker hold		Swing	n/a	

Hanley
Party	Candidate	Votes	%	±%
Labour	Harper Parker	11,508	53.3	+4.5
Unionist	James Seddon	5,817	26.9	−1.8
Liberal	Ada Rowley Moody	4,268	19.8	−2.7
Majority		5,691	26.4	+6.3
Turnout			63.7	−3.7
Labour hold		Swing	+3.1	

Harborough
Party	Candidate	Votes	%	±%
Liberal	John Wycliffe Black	10,841	53.2	+24.0
Unionist	Keith Fraser	9,537	46.8	+4.2
Majority		1,304	6.4	19.8
Turnout			69.1	
Liberal gain from Unionist		Swing	+9.9	

Harrow
Party	Candidate	Votes	%	±%
Independent	Oswald Mosley	14,079	59.9	−6.1
Unionist	Edward Hugh Frederick Morris	9,433	40.1	+6.1
Majority		4,646	19.8	−12.2
Turnout			64.5	
Independent hold		Swing	-6.1	

Hartlepools
Party	Candidate	Votes	%	±%
Liberal	William Jowitt	17,101	46.4	−4.4
Unionist	W. G. Howard Gritten	16,956	46.1	−3.1
Labour	George Belt	2,755	7.5	n/a
Majority		145	0.3	−1.3
Turnout			87.5	+0.3
Liberal hold		Swing	-0.7	

Harwich
Party	Candidate	Votes	%	±%
Liberal	Albert Hillary	12,059	54.3	+2.4
Unionist	Frederick Rice	10,142	45.7	−2.4
Majority		1,917	8.6	+4.8
Turnout			76.2	+4.6
Liberal hold		Swing	+2.4	

Hastings
Party	Candidate	Votes	%	±%
Unionist	Eustace Percy	11,914	52.6	−15.7
Liberal	Maria Gordon	5,876	25.9	n/a
Labour	W. Richard Davies	4,859	21.5	−10.2
Majority		6,038	26.7	−9.9
Turnout			76.4	+5.2
Unionist hold		Swing	n/a	

Hemel Hempstead
Party	Candidate	Votes	%	±%
Liberal	John Freeman Dunn	8,892	50.0	n/a
Unionist	J. C. C. Davidson	8,875	50.0	−17.4
Majority		17	0.0	−34.8
Turnout			65.8	−0.2
Liberal gain from Unionist		Swing	n/a	

Hemsworth
Party	Candidate	Votes	%	±%
Labour	John Guest	13,159	70.1	+6.9
Liberal	Huw Conway-Jones	5,624	29.9	n/a
Majority		7,535	40.2	+13.8
Turnout		18,783	61.3	−15.0
Labour hold		Swing		

Hendon
Party	Candidate	Votes	%	±%
Unionist	Philip Lloyd-Graeme	13,278	51.9	−10.9
Liberal	J. M. Robertson	7,324	28.6	+8.2
Labour	Charles Latham	5,005	19.5	+2.7
Majority		5,954	23.3	−3.5
Turnout			67.3	
Unionist hold		Swing	-9.6	

Henley
Party	Candidate	Votes	%	±%
Unionist	Reginald Terrell	12,092	51.8	−1.3
Liberal	R. Henry Rew	11,266	48.2	+1.3
Majority		826	3.6	−2.6
Turnout		23,358	73.3	+3.7
Unionist hold		Swing	-1.3	

Hereford
Party	Candidate	Votes	%	±%
Unionist	Samuel Roberts	11,448	55.3	−20.9
Liberal	J. Howard Whitehouse	8,280	40.0	n/a
Labour	Sydney Box	981	4.7	−19.1
Majority		3,168	15.3	−37.1
Turnout			72.6	+10.6
Unionist hold		Swing	n/a	

Hertford
Party	Candidate	Votes	%	±%
Unionist	Murray Sueter	10,660	52.2	−11.4
Liberal	Thomas Greenwood	9,763	47.8	+11.4
Majority		897	4.4	−22.8
Turnout			60.6	+6.5
Unionist hold		Swing	-11.4	

Hexham
Party	Candidate	Votes	%	±%
Liberal	Victor Finney	11,293	56.0	+25.0
Unionist	Douglas Clifton Brown	8,887	44.0	−0.8
Majority		2,406	12.0	25.8
Turnout			75.6	−3.7
Liberal gain from Unionist		Swing	+12.9	

Heywood and Radcliffe
Party	Candidate	Votes	%	±%
Liberal	Abraham England	17,163	52.9	−2.5
Labour	Walter Halls	15,273	47.1	+2.5
Majority		1,890	5.8	−5.0
Turnout			78.3	−5.5
Liberal hold		Swing	-2.5	

High Peak
Party	Candidate	Votes	%	±%
Unionist	Samuel Hill-Wood	12,162	44.6	−1.2
Liberal	Robert McDougall	9,432	34.6	+7.5
Labour	Frank Anderson	5,684	20.8	−6.3
Majority		2,730	10.0	−15.4
Turnout			78.2	−4.7
Unionist hold		Swing	-4.4	

Hitchin
Party	Candidate	Votes	%	±%
Unionist	Guy Kindersley	11,157	49.7	−12.3
Labour	Benjamin Skene Mackay	5,913	26.3	−11.7
Liberal	Dugald Macfadyen	5,390	24.0	n/a
Majority		5,244	23.4	
Turnout			67.7	
Unionist hold		Swing		

Holderness
Party	Candidate	Votes	%	±%
Unionist	Samuel Savery	11,099	50.6	+3.5
Liberal	Audley Bowdler	10,846	49.4	−3.5
Majority		253	1.2	7.0
Turnout			78.1	−1.0
Unionist gain from Liberal		Swing	+3.5	

Holland with Boston
Party	Candidate	Votes	%	±%
Labour	William Royce	15,697	54.1	+15.0
Unionist	Arthur Dean	13,331	45.9	+8.6
Majority		2,366	8.2	+6.4
Turnout			68.8	−8.1
Labour hold		Swing	+3.2	

Honiton
Party	Candidate	Votes	%	±%
Unionist	Clive Morrison-Bell	12,470	50.6	n/a
Liberal	John George Hawkins Halse	12,177	49.4	n/a
Majority		293	1.2	n/a
Turnout			81.0	n/a
Unionist hold		Swing	n/a	

Horncastle
Party	Candidate	Votes	%	±%
Liberal	Samuel Pattinson	10,954	54.5	+0.4
Unionist	John Philip Du Cane	9,135	45.5	−0.4
Majority		1,819	9.0	+0.8
Turnout		20,089		
Liberal hold		Swing	+0.4	

Hornsey
Party	Candidate	Votes	%	±%
Unionist	William Ward	16,812	47.4	−5.8
Liberal	Leslie Burgin	15,197	42.8	−4.0
Labour	Christopher Francis Healy	3,487	9.8	n/a
Majority		1,615	4.6	−1.8
Turnout			76.6	−0.6
Unionist hold		Swing	-0.9	

Horsham and Worthing
Party	Candidate	Votes	%	±%
Unionist	Edward Turnour	17,925	66.8	n/a
Labour	Ernest Stanford	8,892	33.2	n/a
Majority		9,033	33.6	n/a
Turnout			59.0	n/a
Unionist hold		Swing	n/a	

Houghton-le-Spring
Party	Candidate	Votes	%	±%
Labour	Robert Richardson	15,225	59.3	+7.4
Liberal	Aaron Curry	10,445	40.7	+19.5
Majority		4,780	18.6	−6.4
Turnout			69.0	−9.4
Labour hold		Swing	-6.1	

Howdenshire
Party	Candidate	Votes	%	±%
Unionist	Stanley Jackson	unopposed	n/a	n/a
Unionist hold		Swing	n/a	

Huddersfield
Party	Candidate	Votes	%	±%
Labour	James Hudson	17,430	36.7	+3.2
Liberal	Arthur Marshall	17,404	36.6	+2.6
Unionist	Charles Tinker	12,694	26.7	+26.7
Majority		26	0.1	0.6
Turnout			81.9	−1.2
Labour gain from Liberal		Swing	+0.3	

Hull Central
Party	Candidate	Votes	%	±%
Liberal	Joseph Kenworthy	15,847	60.1	+4.6
Unionist	Edward Wooll	10,507	39.9	−4.6
Majority		5,340	20.2	+9.2
Turnout			73.0	−6.1
Liberal hold		Swing	+4.6	

Hull East
Party	Candidate	Votes	%	±%
Unionist	Roger Lumley	10,657	38.5	−5.4
Liberal	Charles James Vasey	9,600	34.6	+3.4
Labour	Archibald Stark	7,468	26.9	+2.0
Majority		1,057	3.9	−9.8
Turnout			79.4	
Unionist hold		Swing	-4.4	

Hull North West
Party	Candidate	Votes	%	±%
Unionist	Lambert Ward	12,674	50.2	−6.9
Liberal	John Barran	12,559	49.8	+6.9
Majority		115	0.4	−13.8
Turnout			73.7	
Unionist hold		Swing	-6.9	

Hull South West
Party	Candidate	Votes	%	±%
Liberal	Cyril Entwistle	10,316	41.0	+0.3
Unionist	Herbert Grotrian	8,883	35.3	−2.3
Labour	John Arnott	5,973	23.7	+4.7
Majority		1,433	5.7	+2.6
Turnout				
Liberal hold		Swing	+1.3	

Huntingdonshire
Party	Candidate	Votes	%	±%
Liberal	Leonard Costello	10,465	52.7	+27.0
Unionist	Charles Murchison	9,404	47.3	−3.4
Majority		1,061	5.4	30.4
Turnout		19,869	69.6	−1.1
Liberal gain from Unionist		Swing	+15.2	

Hythe
Party	Candidate	Votes	%	±%
Unionist	Philip Sassoon	unopposed	n/a	n/a
Unionist hold		Swing	n/a	

Ilford
Party	Candidate	Votes	%	±%
Unionist	Fredric Wise	14,136	44.4	0.0
Liberal	John Morris	11,965	37.5	+13.5
Labour	Dan Chater	5,775	18.1	+1.0
Majority		2,171	6.9	−13.5
Turnout			64.8	−5.7
Unionist hold		Swing	-6.8	

Ilkeston
Party	Candidate	Votes	%	±%
Labour	George Oliver	9,191	42.1	+2.1
Unionist	William Marshall Freeman	6,566	30.0	+5.3
Liberal	Thomas Worrall Casey	6,112	27.9	−7.4
Majority		2,625	12.1	+7.4
Turnout			69.4	−7.4
Labour hold		Swing	-1.6	

Ince
Party	Candidate	Votes	%	±%
Labour	Stephen Walsh	17,365	73.5	
Unionist	Rachel Parsons	6,262	26.5	
Majority		11,103	47.0	
Turnout			72.2	
Labour hold		Swing		

Ipswich
Party	Candidate	Votes	%	±%
Labour	Robert Jackson	15,824	50.7	+4.1
Unionist	John Ganzoni	15,364	49.3	−4.1
Majority		460	1.4	8.2
Turnout			78.7	−3.7
Labour gain from Unionist		Swing	+4.1	

Isle of Ely
Party	Candidate	Votes	%	±%
Liberal	Henry Mond	11,476	44.7	+17.0
Unionist	Max Townley	11,009	42.9	−8.0
Labour	Richard Henry Kennard Hope	3,172	12.4	−9.0
Majority		467	1.8	25.0
Turnout			68.1	−3.9
Liberal gain from Unionist		Swing	+12.5	

Isle of Thanet
Party	Candidate	Votes	%	±%
Unionist	Esmond Harmsworth	13,821	50.1	−11.1
Liberal	Reginald Logan Rait	13,773	49.9	+11.1
Majority		48	0.2	−22.2
Turnout			69.5	+1.1
Unionist hold		Swing	-11.1	

Isle of Wight
Party	Candidate	Votes	%	±%
Liberal	J. E. B. Seely	16,249	46.6	+10.4
Unionist	Peter Macdonald	16,159	46.3	+14.7
Labour	E Palmer	2,475	7.1	−4.1
Majority		90	0.3	+4.3
Turnout			76.6	+1.2
Liberal hold		Swing	+2.2	

Jarrow
Party	Candidate	Votes	%	±%
Labour	Robert John Wilson	16,570	63.9	
Unionist	John Lindsley	9,348	36.1	
Majority		7,222	27.8	+5.8
Turnout			67.2	
Labour hold		Swing		

Keighley
Party	Candidate	Votes	%	±%
Liberal	Robert Pilkington	14,609	50.9	+
Labour	Hastings Lees-Smith	14,083	49.1	–
Majority		526	1.8	
Turnout		28,692		
Liberal gain from Labour		Swing	+	

Kettering
Party	Candidate	Votes	%	±%
Labour	Samuel Perry	12,718	43.6	−6.2
Unionist	Owen Parker	10,212	35.0	−15.2
Liberal	Alfred Yeo	6,273	21.5	n/a
Majority		2,506	8.6	9.0
Turnout		29,203	81.3	+0.2
Labour gain from Unionist		Swing	+4.5	

Kidderminster
Party	Candidate	Votes	%	±%
Unionist	John Wardlaw-Milne	15,469	53.1	
Liberal	Henry Purchase	9,663	33.2	n/a
Labour	Louis Tolley	3,990	13.7	
Majority		5,806	19.9	
Turnout			89.4	
Unionist hold		Swing		

King's Lynn
Party	Candidate	Votes	%	±%
Liberal	Graham Woodwark	9,943	38.7	+8.6
Unionist	Neville Jodrell	9,266	36.1	−1.7
Labour	John Stevenson	6,488	25.2	−6.9
Majority		677	2.6	7.1
Turnout			71.9	−3.6
Liberal gain from Unionist		Swing	+5.2	

Kingston upon Thames
Party	Candidate	Votes	%	±%
Unionist	George Penny	12,968	61.6	−5.1
Liberal	William Freeman	8,095	38.4	n/a
Majority		4,873	23.2	−10.2
Turnout			53.9	−5.4
Unionist hold		Swing		

Kingswinford
Party	Candidate	Votes	%	±%
Labour	Charles Sitch	15,174	49.5	
Unionist	William Harcourt-Webb	10,862	35.4	n/a
Liberal	Cecil Patrick Blackwell	4,633	15.1	n/a
Majority		4,312	14.1	
Turnout				
Labour hold		Swing	n/a	

Knutsford
Party	Candidate	Votes	%	±%
Unionist	Ernest Makins	13,838	50.1	−7.8
Liberal	Arthur Stanley	13,758	49.9	+7.8
Majority		80	0.2	−15.6
Turnout			76.8	−1.4
Unionist hold		Swing	-7.8	

=== L to P ===
Lancaster
Party	Candidate	Votes	%	±%
Liberal	John Joseph O'Neill	17,763	59.2	n/a
Unionist	John Singleton	12,263	40.8	−17.6
Majority		5,500	18.4	55.2
Turnout			80.0	
Liberal gain from Unionist		Swing	n/a	

Leeds Central
Party	Candidate	Votes	%	±%
Unionist	Charles Wilson	14,853	56.2	+6.2
Labour	Henry Slesser	11,574	43.8	+16.0
Majority		3,279	12.4	−9.8
Turnout			60.1	−6.1
Unionist hold		Swing		

Leeds North
Party	Candidate	Votes	%	±%
Unionist	Gervase Beckett	14,066	54.0	+2.6
Liberal	Edwin Oldroyd Dodgson	6,624	25.4	−1.5
Labour	David Stewart	5,384	20.6	−1.1
Majority		7,442	28.6	+4.1
Turnout			67.1	−4.7
Unionist hold		Swing	+2.0	

Leeds North East
Party	Candidate	Votes	%	±%
Unionist	John Birchall	12,767	46.7	+0.6
Labour	Frank Fountain	8,574	31.3	+6.9
Liberal	Ronald Walker	6,030	22.0	−7.5
Majority		4,193	15.4	−1.2
Turnout			73.9	−0.3
Unionist hold		Swing	-3.1	

Leeds South
Party	Candidate	Votes	%	±%
Labour	Henry Charleton	11,705	44.2	−9.5
Unionist	Reginald Neville	7,679	29.0	n/a
Liberal	Granville Gibson	7,083	26.8	−19.5
Majority		4,026	15.3	+7.9
Turnout			74.1	+4.3
Labour hold		Swing		

Leeds South East
Party	Candidate	Votes	%	±%
Labour	James O'Grady	12,210	63.2	+4.3
Liberal	William Whiteley	7,110	36.8	−4.3
Majority		5,100	26.4	+8.6
Turnout			54.1	−12.1
Labour hold		Swing	+4.3	

Leeds West
Party	Candidate	Votes	%	±%
Labour	Thomas Stamford	11,434	40.7	−7.6
Unionist	Alexander Frederick Gordon Renton	9,432	33.6	n/a
Liberal	John Murray	7,200	25.7	−26.0
Majority		2,002	7.1	
Turnout			71.6	
Labour gain from Liberal		Swing	n/a	

Leek
Party	Candidate	Votes	%	±%
Labour	William Bromfield	13,913	53.6	
Unionist	Enoch Hill	12,066	46.4	
Majority		1,847	7.2	+5.6
Turnout			77.3	
Labour hold		Swing		

Leicester East
Party	Candidate	Votes	%	±%
Labour	George Banton	13,162	44.8	
Unionist	Arthur Evans	8,247	28.0	
Liberal	James Henderson-Stewart	7,998	27.2	n/a
Majority		4,915	16.8	
Turnout			76.1	
Labour gain from Unionist		Swing		

- elected as a National Liberal in 1922

Leicester South
Party	Candidate	Votes	%	±%
Liberal	Ronald Wilberforce Allen	14,692	57.9	+8.1
Unionist	William Reynolds	10,674	42.1	−8.1
Majority		4,018	15.8	16.2
Turnout			71.0	−0.7
Liberal gain from Unionist		Swing	+8.1	

Leicester West
Party	Candidate	Votes	%	±%
Labour	Frederick Pethick-Lawrence	13,634	44.6	
Liberal	Winston Churchill	9,236	30.2	+3.6
Unionist	Alfred Instone	7,696	25.2	
Majority		4,398	14.4	−2.2
Turnout			76.0	
Labour hold		Swing		

Leigh
Party	Candidate	Votes	%	±%
Labour	Joe Tinker	13,989	43.0	−2.0
Liberal	Robert Abraham Burrows	9,854	30.3	+9.2
Unionist	Herbert Metcalfe	8,664	26.7	−7.2
Majority		4,135	12.7	+1.6
Turnout			86.5	−3.4
Labour hold		Swing	-5.6	

Leominster
Party	Candidate	Votes	%	±%
Unionist	Ernest Shepperson	11,582	57.3	+4.2
Liberal	James Dockett	8,614	42.7	−4.2
Majority		2,968	14.6	+8.4
Turnout			75.8	−3.2
Unionist hold		Swing	+4.2	

Lewes
Party	Candidate	Votes	%	±%
Unionist	William Campion	9,474	59.6	−8.4
Labour	Basil William R Hall	6,422	40.4	+8.4
Majority		3,052	19.2	−16.8
Turnout			58.1	−6.5
Unionist hold		Swing	-8.4	

Leyton East
Party	Candidate	Votes	%	±%
Labour	Archibald Church	7,944	39.5	+8.6
Unionist	Ernest Alexander	6,533	32.4	
Liberal	Thomas Broad	5,669	28.1	
Majority		1,411	7.1	
Turnout			69.1	−3.1
Labour gain from Unionist		Swing		

Leyton West
Party	Candidate	Votes	%	±%
Unionist	James Cassels	8,349	34.5	−12.3
Liberal	Alfred Newbould	8,285	34.3	+4.9
Labour	Alfred Smith	7,536	31.2	+7.4
Majority		64	0.2	−17.2
Turnout			68.0	−1.0
Unionist hold		Swing	-8.6	

Lichfield
Party	Candidate	Votes	%	±%
Labour	Frank Hodges	11,029	48.5	
Unionist	Roy Wilson	9,010	39.7	
Liberal	Thomas Evans Morris	2,683	11.8	
Majority		2,019	8.8	15.2
Turnout			69.7	
Labour gain from National Liberal		Swing	n/a	

Lincoln
Party	Candidate	Votes	%	±%
Unionist	Alfred Davies	11,338	42.0	−17.0
Labour	Robert Arthur Taylor	9,251	34.2	−6.8
Liberal	A. G. Macdonell	6,447	23.8	n/a
Majority		2,087	7.8	−10.2
Turnout			85.5	
Unionist hold		Swing	-5.1	

Liverpool East Toxteth
Party	Candidate	Votes	%	±%
Unionist	James Stuart Rankin	unopposed	n/a	n/a
Unionist hold		Swing	n/a	

Liverpool Edge Hill
Party	Candidate	Votes	%	±%
Labour	Jack Hayes	13,538	56.9	
Unionist	Oliver Stanley	10,249	43.1	
Majority		3,289	13.8	
Turnout			69.9	
Labour gain from Unionist		Swing		

Liverpool Everton
Party	Candidate	Votes	%	±%
Unionist	John Harmood-Banner	9,183	54.5	−6.1
Labour	Henry Walker	7,673	45.5	+6.1
Majority		1,510	9.0	−12.2
Turnout		16,856	59.8	−10.5
Unionist hold		Swing	-6.1	

Liverpool Exchange
Party	Candidate	Votes	%	±%
Unionist	Leslie Scott	10,551	50.5	−4.9
Irish Nationalist	William Grogan	10,322	49.5	+4.9
Majority		229	1.0	−9.8
Turnout			51.9	−22.9
Unionist hold		Swing	-4.9	

Liverpool Fairfield
Party	Candidate	Votes	%	±%
Unionist	Jack Cohen	unopposed	n/a	n/a
Unionist hold		Swing	n/a	

Liverpool Kirkdale
Party	Candidate	Votes	%	±%
Unionist	De Fonblanque Pennefather	unopposed	n/a	n/a
Unionist hold		Swing	n/a	

Liverpool Scotland
Party	Candidate	Votes	%	±%
Irish Nationalist	T. P. O'Connor	unopposed	n/a	n/a
Irish Nationalist hold		Swing	n/a	

Liverpool Walton
Party	Candidate	Votes	%	±%
Unionist	Warden Chilcott	unopposed	n/a	n/a
Unionist hold		Swing	n/a	

Liverpool Wavertree
Party	Candidate	Votes	%	±%
Liberal	Hugh Rathbone	9,349	37.3	n/a
Unionist	Harold Smith	8,700	34.7	−26.9
Labour	James Vint Laughland	7,025	28.0	−10.4
Majority		649	2.6	25.8
Turnout			71.9	+
Liberal gain from Unionist		Swing	n/a	

Liverpool West Derby
Party	Candidate	Votes	%	±%
Liberal	Sydney Jones	12,942	54.2	n/a
Unionist	Reginald Hall	10,952	45.8	−24.7
Majority		1,990	8.4	49.4
Turnout			63.5	−1.5
Liberal gain from Unionist		Swing	n/a	

Liverpool West Toxteth
Party	Candidate	Votes	%	±%
Unionist	Robert Houston	12,457	50.3	−9.3
Labour	Joseph Gibbins	12,318	49.7	+9.3
Majority		139	0.6	−18.6
Turnout		24,775	66.1	−3.0
Unionist hold		Swing	-9.3	

Lonsdale
Party	Candidate	Votes	%	±%
Liberal	Henry Maden	11,186	52.4	+25.9
Unionist	Nigel Kennedy	10,176	47.6	
Majority		1,010	4.8	33.4
Turnout			75.4	
Liberal gain from Unionist		Swing		

Loughborough
Party	Candidate	Votes	%	±%
Liberal	Edward Spears	8,937	36.0	n/a
Labour	Ernest Winterton	8,064	32.5	n/a
Unionist	Frank Rye	7,805	31.5	n/a
Majority		873	3.5	
Turnout			76.9	
Liberal hold		Swing		

Louth
Party	Candidate	Votes	%	±%
Liberal	Margaret Wintringham	12,104	52.4	+0.4
Unionist	Geoffrey Peto	11,003	47.6	−0.4
Majority		1,101	4.8	+0.8
Turnout			79.6	+1.1
Liberal hold		Swing	+0.4	

Lowestoft
Party	Candidate	Votes	%	±%
Unionist	Gervais Rentoul	11,103	45.8	
Liberal	Frederick Paterson	8,362	34.5	
Labour	Robert Arthur Mellanby	4,788	19.7	
Majority		2,741	11.3	
Turnout			67.6	
Unionist hold		Swing		

Ludlow
Party	Candidate	Votes	%	±%
Unionist	George Windsor-Clive	unopposed	n/a	n/a
Unionist hold		Swing	n/a	

Luton
Party	Candidate	Votes	%	±%
Liberal	Geoffrey Howard	15,569	51.4	+18.2
Unionist	John Prescott Hewett	11,738	38.7	−4.8
Labour	Willet Ball	2,998	9.9	−13.4
Majority		3,831	12.7	23.0
Turnout			78.1	
Liberal gain from Unionist		Swing	+11.5	

Macclesfield
Party	Candidate	Votes	%	±%
Unionist	John Remer	14,744	45.1	−3.0
Liberal	William Tudor Davies	11,259	34.4	+2.5
Labour	Andrew Joseph Penston	6,713	20.5	+0.5
Majority		3,485	10.7	−5.5
Turnout			83.9	−2.1
Unionist hold		Swing	-2.8	

Maidstone
Party	Candidate	Votes	%	±%
Unionist	Carlyon Bellairs	11,244	41.9	+7.3
Liberal	George Foster Clark	9,047	33.7	−0.7
Labour	Seymour Cocks	6,558	24.4	−6.6
Majority		2,197	8.2	+8.0
Turnout			78.9	+0.4
Unionist hold		Swing	+4.0	

Maldon
Party	Candidate	Votes	%	±%
Labour	Valentine Crittall	10,329	50.1	+22.3
Unionist	Edward Ruggles-Brise	10,280	49.9	+2.7
Majority		49	0.2	19.6
Turnout		21,892	69.6	−5.2
Labour gain from Unionist		Swing	+9.7	

Manchester Ardwick
Party	Candidate	Votes	%	±%
Labour	Thomas Lowth	15,673	60.4	++8.1
Unionist	Augustine Hailwood	10,266	39.6	−8.1
Majority		5,407	20.8	+16.2
Turnout			69.3	
Labour hold		Swing	+8.1	

Manchester Blackley
Party	Candidate	Votes	%	±%
Liberal	Philip Oliver	12,235	62.6	+32.7
Unionist	Harold Briggs	7,313	37.4	−5.9
Majority		4,922	25.2	38.6
Turnout			75.4	
Liberal gain from Unionist		Swing	+19.3	

Manchester Clayton
Party	Candidate	Votes	%	±%
Labour	John Edward Sutton	17,255	56.7	
Unionist	William Flanagan	13,164	43.3	
Majority		4,091	13.4	
Turnout			83.5	
Labour gain from Unionist		Swing		

Manchester Exchange
Party	Candidate	Votes	%	±%
Liberal	Robert Noton Barclay	12,248	54.0	+11.8
Unionist	Edwin Stockton	10,449	46.0	−11.8
Majority		1,799	8.0	23.6
Turnout		22,697	59.4	−1.8
Liberal gain from Unionist		Swing	+11.8	

Manchester Gorton
Party	Candidate	Votes	%	±%
Labour	Joseph Compton	16,080	60.0	
Unionist	William Heap	10,702	40.0	
Majority		5,378	20.0	
Turnout			74.5	
Labour hold		Swing		

Manchester Hulme
Party	Candidate	Votes	%	±%
Unionist	Joseph Nall	10,035	35.8	−21.6
Liberal	Walter Davies	9,603	34.2	−8.4
Labour	Andrew McElwee	8,433	30.0	n/a
Majority		432	1.6	−13.2
Turnout			71.5	+1.4
Unionist hold		Swing	-6.6	

Manchester Platting
Party	Candidate	Votes	%	±%
Labour	J. R. Clynes	17,078	54.8	
Unionist	Frank Henry Holmes	14,099	45.2	
Majority		2,979	9.6	
Turnout			78.1	
Labour hold		Swing		

Manchester Moss Side
Party	Candidate	Votes	%	±%
Liberal	Thomas Ackroyd	12,210	54.9	+26.0
Unionist	Gerald Hurst	9,097	40.9	−10.3
Independent	James Charles Daniel Bustard	949	4.3	n/a
Majority		3,113	14.0	
Turnout		22,256	66.4	
Liberal gain from Unionist		Swing	+18.1	

Manchester Rusholme
Party	Candidate	Votes	%	±%
Liberal	Charles Masterman	10,901	43.4	+17.3
Unionist	John Henry Thorpe	8,876	35.3	−12.6
Labour	William Paul	5,366	21.3	
Majority		2,025	8.1	+29.9
Turnout			78.0	+0.2
Liberal gain from Unionist		Swing		

Manchester Withington
Party	Candidate	Votes	%	±%
Liberal	Ernest Simon	13,944	58.2	+9.7
Unionist	Thomas Watts	10,026	41.8	−9.7
Majority		3,918	16.4	19.4
Turnout			78.0	+0.6
Liberal gain from Unionist		Swing	+9.7	

Mansfield
Party	Candidate	Votes	%	±%
Labour	Frank Varley	18,813	57.8	+9.8
Liberal	Albert Bennett	13,757	42.2	−9.8
Majority		5,056	15.6	19.6
Turnout			75.9	+1.6
Labour gain from Liberal		Swing	+9.8	

Melton
Party	Candidate	Votes	%	±%
Unionist	Charles Yate	13,239	50.1	−3.5
Liberal	Arthur Richardson	13,195	49.9	+3.5
Majority		44	0.2	−7.0
Turnout			80.9	+1.0
Unionist hold		Swing	-3.5	

Middlesbrough East
Party	Candidate	Votes	%	±%
Liberal	Penry Williams	9,241	40.6	+13.0
Labour	Martin Connolly	7,712	33.9	+0.5
Unionist	James Reid	5,790	25.5	−13.5
Majority		1,529	6.7	
Turnout			77.3	−1.5
Liberal gain from Unionist		Swing		

Middlesbrough West
Party	Candidate	Votes	%	±%
Liberal	Trevelyan Thomson	16,837	69.4	0.0
Labour	J. D. White	7,413	30.6	n/a
Majority		9,424	38.8	0.0
Turnout			68.6	+0.2
Liberal hold		Swing	n/a	

Middleton and Prestwich
Party	Candidate	Votes	%	±%
Unionist	Nairne Stewart Sandeman	10,029	36.6	n/a
Liberal	Ryland Adkins	9,500	34.7	−23.8
Labour	Matthew Burrow Farr	7,849	28.7	−12.8
Majority		529	1.9	n/a
Turnout		27,378		
Unionist gain from Liberal		Swing	n/a	

Mitcham
Party	Candidate	Votes	%	±%
Unionist	Richard Meller	10,829	52.3	
Labour	James Chuter Ede	9,877	47.7	
Majority		952	4.6	
Turnout			63.2	
Unionist hold		Swing		

Morpeth
Party	Candidate	Votes	%	±%
Labour	Robert Smillie	16,902	64.2	
Liberal	John Dodd	9,411	35.8	
Majority		7,491	28.4	
Turnout			59.4	
Labour hold		Swing		

Mossley
Party	Candidate	Votes	%	±%
Independent	Austin Hopkinson	11,426	50.8	−7.6
Liberal	George Jennison	11,051	49.2	+7.6
Majority		375	1.6	−15.2
Turnout		22,477	54.5	
Independent hold		Swing	-7.6	

Nelson and Colne
Party	Candidate	Votes	%	±%
Labour	Arthur Greenwood	17,083	46.1	
Liberal	James Henry Sutherland Aitken	10,103	27.3	
Unionist	Amos Nelson	9,861	26.6	
Majority		6,980	18.8	+1.9
Turnout			83.4	
Labour hold		Swing	+0.9	

Newark
Party	Candidate	Votes	%	±%
Unionist	William Cavendish	12,357	55.9	−8.9
Liberal	Lawrence Priestley	9,741	44.1	n/a
Majority		2,616	11.8	−17.8
Turnout			72.4	−7.5
Unionist hold		Swing	n/a	

Newbury
Party	Candidate	Votes	%	±%
Liberal	Harold Stranger	11,226	50.1	+7.5
Unionist	Howard Clifton Brown	11,185	49.9	−7.5
Majority		41	0.2	N/A
Turnout		22,411	71.3	+1.6
Liberal gain from Unionist		Swing	+7.5	

Newcastle-under-Lyme
Party	Candidate	Votes	%	±%
Labour	Josiah Wedgwood	12,881	65.6	
Unionist	John Ravenshaw	6,746	34.4	
Majority		6,135	31.2	
Turnout			64.2	
Labour hold		Swing		

Newcastle-upon-Tyne Central
Party	Candidate	Votes	%	±%
Labour	Charles Trevelyan	12,447	52.5	
Unionist	Francis Fisher	11,260	47.5	
Majority		1,187	5.0	
Turnout			67.4	
Labour hold		Swing		

Newcastle upon Tyne East
Party	Candidate	Votes	%	±%
Liberal	Robert Aske	12,656	52.3	+22.3
Labour	Arthur Henderson	11,532	47.7	+4.6
Majority		1,124	4.6	17.7
Turnout			73.2	−0.5
Liberal gain from Labour		Swing	+8.9	

Newcastle-upon-Tyne North
Party	Candidate	Votes	%	±%
Unionist	Nicholas Grattan-Doyle	12,715	52.1	
Liberal	Robert Wilfred Simpson	6,321	25.9	−7.0
Labour	John Beckett	5,374	22.0	n/a
Majority		6,394	26.2	
Turnout			73.6	
Unionist hold		Swing		

Newcastle upon Tyne West
Party	Candidate	Votes	%	±%
Liberal	Cecil Ramage	15,141	56.8	+13.4
Labour	David Adams	11,527	43.2	−0.7
Majority		3,614	13.6	14.1
Turnout			79.3	
Liberal gain from Labour		Swing	+7.0	

New Forest and Christchurch
Party	Candidate	Votes	%	±%
Unionist	Wilfrid Ashley	13,900	53.9	n/a
Liberal	Alexander Boulton	11,889	46.1	n/a
Majority		2,011	7.8	n/a
Turnout			68.8	n/a
Unionist hold		Swing	n/a	

Newton
Party	Candidate	Votes	%	±%
Labour	Robert Young	12,492	59.9	
Unionist	Henry Baker Bates	8,375	40.1	
Majority		4,117	19.8	+1.3
Turnout			78.5	
Labour hold		Swing		

Norfolk East
Party	Candidate	Votes	%	±%
Liberal	Hugh Seely	11,807	49.6	+9.9
Unionist	Michael Falcon	8,472	35.6	−5.4
Labour	George Edward Hewitt	3,530	14.8	−4.5
Majority		3,335	14.0	
Turnout			72.5	
Liberal gain from Unionist		Swing		

Norfolk North
Party	Candidate	Votes	%	±%
Labour	Noel Buxton	12,278	57.6	+5.4
Unionist	Brian Smith	9,022	42.4	−5.4
Majority		3,256	15.2	+10.8
Turnout			68.3	−6.9
Labour hold		Swing	+5.4	

Norfolk South
Party	Candidate	Votes	%	±%
Labour	George Edwards	11,682	51.9	
Unionist	Thomas William Hay	10,821	48.1	
Majority		861	3.8	
Turnout			68.3	
Labour gain from Unionist		Swing		

Norfolk South West
Party	Candidate	Votes	%	±%
Unionist	Alan McLean	11,269	53.5	n/a
Labour	W. B. Taylor	9,779	46.5	
Majority		1,490	7.0	
Turnout			64.7	
Unionist gain from National Liberal		Swing		

Normanton
Party	Candidate	Votes	%	±%
Labour	Frederick Hall	15,453	78.0	
Unionist	George Hillman	4,365	22.0	
Majority		11,088	56.0	
Turnout			61.5	
Labour hold		Swing		

Northampton
Party	Candidate	Votes	%	±%
Labour	Margaret Bondfield	15,556	40.5	+2.6
Unionist	John Veasy Collier	11,520	30.0	n/a
Liberal	Charles McCurdy	11,342	29.5	n/a
Majority		4,036	10.5	
Turnout			84.3	
Labour gain from Liberal		Swing	n/a	

Northwich
Party	Candidate	Votes	%	±%
Unionist	Colum Crichton-Stuart	11,835	38.5	−15.7
Liberal	Arthur Mort	9,765	31.7	n/a
Labour	John Williams	9,183	29.8	−16.0
Majority		2,070	6.8	−1.6
Turnout			76.1	+4.5
Unionist hold		Swing	n/a	

Norwich (2 seats)
Party	Candidate	Votes	%	±%
Labour	Walter Smith	20,077	20.9	
Labour	Dorothy Jewson	19,304	20.0	
Liberal	Hilton Young	16,222	16.9	
Unionist	George Roberts	14,749	15.3	
Liberal	Henry John Copeman	13,180	13.7	
Unionist	Henry Dawes Swan	12,713	13.2	
Majority		3,082	3.1	
Turnout			79.8	
Labour gain from National Liberal		Swing		
Labour gain from National Liberal		Swing		

Nottingham Central
Party	Candidate	Votes	%	±%
Liberal	Reginald Berkeley	13,208	53.7	+3.7
Unionist	Albert Atkey	11,403	46.3	−3.7
Majority		1,805	7.4	+7.4
Turnout			72.8	
Liberal hold		Swing	+3.7	

Nottingham East
Party	Candidate	Votes	%	±%
Liberal	Norman Birkett	11,355	53.4	+13.1
Unionist	John Houfton	9,919	46.6	−13.1
Majority		1,436	6.8	26.2
Turnout		21,274	67.8	+1.6
Liberal gain from Unionist		Swing	+13.1	

Nottingham South
Party	Candidate	Votes	%	±%
Unionist	Henry Cavendish-Bentinck	10,724	51.4	
Independent Labour	Henry Mills	5,176	24.8	
Liberal	Victor Deidorichs Duval	4,966	23.8	
Majority		5,548	26.6	
Turnout			67.6	
Unionist hold		Swing		

Nottingham West
Party	Candidate	Votes	%	±%
Labour	Arthur Hayday	12,366	62.7	
Unionist	James Langham Litchfield	7,370	37.3	
Majority		4,996	25.4	+3.9
Turnout			63.5	
Labour hold		Swing		

Nuneaton
Party	Candidate	Votes	%	±%
Liberal	Herbert Willison	14,518	40.4	+11.2
Unionist	Henry Maddocks	10,940	30.5	−7.8
Labour	Thomas Barron	10,437	29.1	−3.4
Majority		3,578	9.9	15.7
Turnout			72.6	+2.8
Liberal gain from Unionist		Swing	+9.5	

Oldham (2 seats)
Party	Candidate	Votes	%	±%
Labour	William John Tout	20,939	23.4	−4.3
Liberal	Edward Grigg	20,681	23.2	−4.8
Liberal	William Wiggins	17,990	20.1	+9.0
Unionist	W.E. Freeman	15,819	17.7	n/a
Unionist	Samuel Smethurst	13,894	15.6	−10.6
Majority		2,949	3.3	
Majority		4,862	5.5	
Turnout			76.3	−2.5
Labour hold		Swing		
Liberal hold		Swing		

Ormskirk
Party	Candidate	Votes	%	±%
Unionist	Francis Blundell	10,598	53.0	−5.7
Labour	Robert Barrie Walker	9,388	47.0	+5.7
Majority		1,210	6.0	−11.4
Turnout		19,986	65.7	−2.1
Unionist hold		Swing	-5.7	

Oswestry
Party	Candidate	Votes	%	±%
Unionist	William Bridgeman	11,528	46.6	−3.6
Liberal	Russell Sidebottom	9,713	39.3	+13.3
Labour	Sidney Ronald Campion	3,477	14.1	−9.7
Majority		1,815	7.3	−16.9
Turnout			75.8	−4.4
Unionist hold		Swing	-8.5	

Oxford
Party	Candidate	Votes	%	±%
Liberal	Frank Gray	12,311	56.1	−2.9
Unionist	Robert Bourne	9,618	43.9	+2.9
Majority		2,693	12.2	−5.8
Turnout		21,929	83.5	−0.3
Liberal hold		Swing	-2.9	

Penistone
Party	Candidate	Votes	%	±%
Liberal	William Pringle	9,164	36.9	+1.1
Labour	Rennie Smith	8,329	33.5	−0.2
Unionist	Charles Hodgkinson	7,369	29.6	−0.9
Majority		835	3.4	+1.3
Turnout		24,862	71.8	−1.3
Liberal hold		Swing	+0.7	

Penrith and Cockermouth
Party	Candidate	Votes	%	±%
Unionist	Arthur Dixey	9,205	50.9	+2.0
Liberal	Levi Collison	8,878	49.1	−2.0
Majority		327	1.8	4.0
Turnout			83.2	+0.2
Unionist gain from Liberal		Swing	+2.0	

Penryn and Falmouth
Party	Candidate	Votes	%	±%
Liberal	Courtenay Mansel	17,015	62.0	+23.2
Unionist	Denis Shipwright	10,429	38.0	−4.7
Majority		6,586	24.0	+33.9
Turnout			73.0	+0.5
Liberal gain from Unionist		Swing	+17.0	

Peterborough
Party	Candidate	Votes	%	±%
Unionist	Henry Brassey	11,634	43.4	
Labour	John Mansfield	8,177	30.5	
Liberal	Daniel Boyle	7,014	26.1	
Majority		3,457	12.9	
Turnout		26,825	74.4	
Unionist hold		Swing		

Petersfield
Party	Candidate	Votes	%	±%
Unionist	William Graham Nicholson	12,195	65.6	+1.4
Labour	Dudley Aman	6,403	34.4	−1.4
Majority		5,792	31.2	+2.8
Turnout			60.6	−5.1
Unionist hold		Swing	+1.4	

Plymouth Devonport
Party	Candidate	Votes	%	±%
Liberal	Leslie Hore-Belisha	12,269	45.7	+11.2
Unionist	Clement Kinloch-Cooke	10,428	38.8	−3.5
Labour	Joseph Harris	4,158	15.5	−7.7
Majority		1,841	6.9	−0.9
Turnout			82.7	+3.6
Liberal gain from Unionist		Swing	+7.3	

Plymouth Drake
Party	Candidate	Votes	%	±%
Unionist	Arthur Benn	12,345	43.7	−0.2
Labour	James John Hamlyn Moses	11,849	41.9	+10.5
Liberal	Edward Ernest Henry Atkin	4,082	14.4	−10.3
Majority		496	1.8	
Turnout			77.9	
Unionist hold		Swing	-5.3	

Plymouth Sutton
Party	Candidate	Votes	%	±%
Unionist	Nancy Astor	16,114	54.5	+7.1
Labour	Frederick Woulfe-Brenan	13,438	45.5	+8.7
Majority		2,676	9.0	−1.6
Turnout			77.9	−0.1
Unionist hold		Swing	-0.8	

Pontefract
Party	Candidate	Votes	%	±%
Labour	Tom Smith	11,134	45.3	+6.4
Unionist	Albert Braithwaite	8,872	36.1	+0.0
Liberal	Mary Pollock Grant	4,567	18.6	−6.4
Majority		2,262	9.2	+6.4
Turnout			73.5	−0.4
Labour hold		Swing	+3.2	

Portsmouth Central
Party	Candidate	Votes	%	±%
Liberal	Thomas Bramsdon	11,493	38.7	+13.8
Unionist	Frank Privett	10,231	34.4	+7.5
Labour	Frank Percy Crozier	7,991	26.9	+5.5
Majority		1,262	4.3	4.4
Turnout			78.2	
Liberal gain from Unionist		Swing	+3.2	

Portsmouth North
Party	Candidate	Votes	%	±%
Unionist	Bertram Falle	13,229	50.2	
Labour	Olaf Gleeson	9,523	36.2	
Liberal	William Llewellyn Williams	3,584	13.6	−3.6
Majority		3,706	14.0	−15.0
Turnout			71.7	
Unionist hold		Swing		

Portsmouth South
Party	Candidate	Votes	%	±%
Unionist	Herbert Cayzer	16,625	55.9	−12.8
Labour	Jessie Stephen	7,388	24.9	n/a
Liberal	Sidney Robert Drury-Lowe	5,698	19.2	−12.1
Majority		9,237	31.0	−6.4
Turnout			72.7	+21.9
Unionist hold		Swing	n/a	

Preston (2 seats)
Party	Candidate	Votes	%	±%
Labour	Tom Shaw	25,816	34.4	
Liberal	James Hodge	25,155	33.6	
Unionist	William Kirkpatrick	23,953	32.0	
Majority		1,854	2.4	
Majority		1,193	1.6	
Turnout			87.2	
Labour hold		Swing		
Liberal hold		Swing		

Pudsey and Otley
Party	Candidate	Votes	%	±%
Unionist	Francis Watson	11,537	43.7	
Liberal	Tudor Walters	9,330	35.4	
Labour	Percy Myers	5,499	20.9	
Majority		2,207	8.3	
Turnout			79.1	
Unionist hold		Swing		

=== R to Z ===
Reading
Party	Candidate	Votes	%	±%
Labour	Somerville Hastings	16,657	44.8	+6.7
Unionist	Edward Cadogan	15,115	40.7	−2.0
Liberal	Frederick Maddison	5,406	14.5	−4.7
Majority		1,542	4.1	−0.5
Turnout			82.1	
Labour gain from Unionist		Swing	+4.3	

Reigate
Party	Candidate	Votes	%	±%
Unionist	George Cockerill	unopposed	n/a	n/a
Unionist hold		Swing	n/a	

Richmond (Yorks)
Party	Candidate	Votes	%	±%
Unionist	Murrough Wilson	unopposed	n/a	n/a
Unionist hold		Swing	n/a	

Richmond (Surrey)
Party	Candidate	Votes	%	±%
Unionist	Harry Becker	13,112	63.0	+12.4
Liberal	Margery Corbett Ashby	7,702	37.0	+12.9
Majority		5,410	26.0	+.07
Turnout		20,814	59.4	−9.4
Unionist gain from Ind. Unionist		Swing	n/a	

Ripon
Party	Candidate	Votes	%	±%
Unionist	Edward Wood	unopposed	n/a	n/a
Unionist hold		Swing	n/a	

Rochdale
Party	Candidate	Votes	%	±%
Liberal	Ramsay Muir	15,087	36.4	+7.2
Labour	Stanley Burgess	13,525	32.6	−6.2
Unionist	Nicholas Cockshutt	12,845	31.0	−1.0
Majority		1,562	3.8	10.6
Turnout		41,457	87.8	+0.7
Liberal gain from Labour		Swing		

Romford
Party	Candidate	Votes	%	±%
Unionist	Charles Rhys	9,585	35.8	
Labour	Albert Enil Davies	9,109	33.9	
Liberal	David Marshall Mason	8,144	30.3	
Majority		476	1.9	
Turnout			61.4	
Unionist gain from National Liberal		Swing		

Rossendale
Party	Candidate	Votes	%	±%
Unionist	Robert Waddington	11,362	37.6	−5.0
Liberal	Ernest Young	9,592	31.8	+10.9
Labour	Norman Angell	9,230	30.6	−5.9
Majority		1,770	5.8	−0.3
Turnout			83.8	−1.2
Unionist hold		Swing	-8.0	

Rotherham
Party	Candidate	Votes	%	±%
Labour	Fred Lindley	16,983	53.9	+4.9
Unionist	Frederic Kelley	14,535	46.1	−4.9
Majority		2,448	7.8	9.8
Turnout			75.3	−6.3
Labour gain from Unionist		Swing	+4.9	

Rother Valley
Party	Candidate	Votes	%	±%
Labour	Thomas Walter Grundy	15,967	68.6	n/a
Unionist	Frances R. Wade	7,323	31.4	n/a
Majority		8,644	37.2	n/a
Turnout			64.0	n/a
Labour hold		Swing	n/a	

Rothwell
Party	Candidate	Votes	%	±%
Labour	William Lunn	15,115	66.0	
Liberal	Benjamin Pickersgill Wilson	7,788	34.0	
Majority		7,327	32.0	
Turnout			60.9	
Labour hold		Swing		

Royton
Party	Candidate	Votes	%	±%
Liberal	William Gorman	14,836	49.6	
Unionist	Wilfrid Sugden	12,354	41.2	
Labour	James Barton Turner	2,740	9.2	
Majority		2,516	8.4	
Turnout			82.9	
Liberal gain from Unionist		Swing		

Rugby
Party	Candidate	Votes	%	±%
Liberal	Ernest Brown	13,798	55.0	
Unionist	Euan Wallace	11,286	45.0	
Majority		2,512	10.0	
Turnout			75.2	
Liberal gain from Unionist		Swing		

Rushcliffe
Party	Candidate	Votes	%	±%
Unionist	Henry Betterton	12,427	44.5	−12.3
Liberal	John Lewin	8,581	30.8	n/a
Labour	James Wilson	6,882	24.7	−18.5
Majority		3,846	13.7	+0.1
Turnout			73.3	
Unionist hold		Swing	n/a	

Rutland and Stamford
Party	Candidate	Votes	%	±%
Unionist	Neville Smith-Carington	10,803	51.4	+4.6
Liberal	Frank Stapledon Hiley	5,203	24.8	n/a
Labour	Arthur Sells	5,005	23.8	−9.1
Majority		5,600	26.6	+12.7
Turnout			76.7	−4.5
Unionist hold		Swing		

Rye
Party	Candidate	Votes	%	±%
Unionist	George Courthope	11,167	53.6	
Liberal	George Ellis	9,651	46.4	
Majority		1,516	7.2	
Turnout			69.4	
Unionist hold		Swing		

Saffron Walden
Party	Candidate	Votes	%	±%
Unionist	William Foot Mitchell	9,652	44.3	+0.7
Labour	William Cash	6,398	29.3	−0.8
Liberal	Robert McNair Wilson	5,752	26.4	+13.8
Majority		3,254	15.0	+1.5
Turnout			67.7	−3.4
Unionist hold		Swing	-0.7	

St Albans
Party	Candidate	Votes	%	±%
Unionist	Francis Fremantle	11,968	47.7	−10.1
Labour	Christopher Thomson	6,640	26.5	−15.7
Liberal	Harry Krauss Nield	6,469	25.8	n/a
Majority		5,328	21.2	+5.6
Turnout		25,077	68.8	−2.3
Unionist hold		Swing	+2.8	

St Helens
Party	Candidate	Votes	%	±%
Labour	James Sexton	20,086	55.5	−3.2
Unionist	Margaret Evelyn Pilkington	16,109	44.5	+3.2
Majority		3,977	11.0	−6.4
Turnout			80.5	+0.5
Labour hold		Swing	-3.2	

St Ives
Party	Candidate	Votes	%	±%
Liberal	Clifford Cory	9,922	46.5	+0.0
Unionist	Anthony Hawke	8,652	40.6	−12.9
Labour	Albert Dunn	2,749	12.9	n/a
Majority		1,270	5.9	12.9
Turnout		21,323	71.4	+5.8
Liberal gain from Unionist		Swing	+6.5	

Salford North
Party	Candidate	Votes	%	±%
Labour	Benjamin Tillett	13,377	51.1	+9.6
Unionist	Samuel Finburgh	12,810	48.9	+7.4
Majority		567	2.2	+2.2
Turnout			73.9	
Labour hold		Swing	+1.1	

Salford South
Party	Candidate	Votes	%	±%
Labour	Joseph Toole	12,097	46.0	n/a
Unionist	Anderson Montague-Barlow	9,366	35.6	n/a
Liberal	Edgar Jones	4,851	18.4	n/a
Majority		2,731	10.4	n/a
Turnout			72.2	n/a
Labour gain from Unionist		Swing	n/a	

Salford West
Party	Candidate	Votes	%	±%
Labour	Alexander Haycock	9,868	38.4	+6.1
Unionist	Fred Astbury	9,752	37.9	−7.0
Liberal	George Hay Morgan	6,097	23.7	+0.9
Majority		116	0.5	13.1
Turnout		25,717	76.5	
Labour gain from Unionist		Swing	+6.5	

Salisbury
Party	Candidate	Votes	%	±%
Liberal	Hugh Moulton	12,375	51.4	
Unionist	Hugh Morrison	11,710	48.6	
Majority		665	2.8	
Turnout		24,085		
Liberal gain from Unionist		Swing		

Scarborough and Whitby
Party	Candidate	Votes	%	±%
Unionist	Sidney Herbert	15,927	51.6	−3.6
Liberal	Ashley Mitchell	14,933	48.4	+3.6
Majority		994	3.2	−7.2
Turnout			76.4	+0.2
Unionist hold		Swing	-3.6	

Seaham
Party	Candidate	Votes	%	±%
Labour	Sidney Webb	21,281	71.3	+11.4
Unionist	Ronald Ross	8,546	28.7	+4.1
Majority		12,735	42.6	+7.3
Turnout			71.3	−10.6
Labour hold		Swing	+3.6	

Sedgefield
Party	Candidate	Votes	%	±%
Unionist	Leonard Ropner	11,093	50.0	+ 9.5
Labour	John Herriotts	11,087	50.0	+ 6.4
Majority		6	0.0	−3.1
Turnout			74.5	– 1.6
Unionist gain from Labour		Swing	+1.6	

Sevenoaks
Party	Candidate	Votes	%	±%
Liberal	Ronald Williams	10,656	51.6	n/a
Unionist	Thomas Jewell Bennett	9,987	48.4	
Majority		669	3.2	
Turnout		20,643		
Liberal gain from Unionist		Swing	n/a	

Sheffield Attercliffe
Party	Candidate	Votes	%	±%
Labour	Cecil Wilson	13,581	58.7	−9.5
Unionist	George Terrell	6,106	26.4	n/a
Liberal	Harry Briggs	3,438	14.9	n/a
Majority		7,475	32.3	−4.1
Turnout			66.8	−1.8
Labour hold		Swing	n/a	

Sheffield Brightside
Party	Candidate	Votes	%	±%
Labour	Arthur Ponsonby	14,741	53.0	−7.4
Unionist	Matthew Sheppard	9,408	33.8	n/a
Liberal	Thomas Illingworth Clough	3,684	13.2	n/a
Majority		5,333	19.2	−1.6
Turnout			73.0	−2.0
Labour hold		Swing	n/a	

Sheffield Central
Party	Candidate	Votes	%	±%
Unionist	James Hope	9,727	45.7	n/a
Labour	Tom Snowden	8,762	41.1	n/a
Liberal	John Henry Freeborough	2,810	13.2	n/a
Majority		965	4.6	n/a
Turnout			61.3	n/a
Unionist hold		Swing	n/a	

Sheffield Ecclesall
Party	Candidate	Votes	%	±%
Unionist	Albert Harland	13,047	63.6	n/a
Liberal	Hamer Russell	7,456	36.4	n/a
Majority		5,591	27.2	n/a
Turnout			69.5	n/a
Unionist hold		Swing	n/a	

Sheffield Hallam
Party	Candidate	Votes	%	±%
Unionist	Frederick Sykes	12,119	52.7	−1.7
Labour	Arnold Freeman	5,506	23.9	n/a
Liberal	Cuthbert Snowball Rewcastle	5,383	23.4	−17.2
Majority		6,613	28.8	+10.0
Turnout			75.0	+1.3
Unionist hold		Swing	n/a	

Sheffield Hillsborough
Party	Candidate	Votes	%	±%
Labour Co-op	A. V. Alexander	15,087	55.7	−0.5
Unionist	Charles Boot	8,369	30.9	n/a
Liberal	Ernest Woodhead	3,636	13.4	n/a
Majority		6,718	24.8	+12.4
Turnout			73.3	−1.4
Labour Co-op hold		Swing	n/a	

Sheffield Park
Party	Candidate	Votes	%	±%
Unionist	Richard Storry Deans	9,648	41.9	n/a
Labour	George Lathan	9,050	39.4	−33.5
Liberal	Henry Stephenson	4,296	18.7	−8.4
Majority		598	2.5	6.9
Turnout			74.1	+1.1
Unionist gain from Liberal		Swing	n/a	

Shipley
Party	Candidate	Votes	%	±%
Labour	William Mackinder	11,918	38.4	+1.2
Liberal	John Pybus	10,262	33.0	+20.8
Unionist	Richard Garnett	8,872	28.6	n/a
Majority		1,656	5.4	8.8
Turnout			82.7	+1.0
Labour gain from National Liberal		Swing	n/a	

Shrewsbury
Party	Candidate	Votes	%	±%
Liberal	Joseph Sunlight	11,097	51.3	+5.2
Unionist	Dudley Ryder	10,548	48.7	−5.2
Majority		549	2.6	10.4
Turnout		21,645		
Liberal gain from Unionist		Swing	+5.2	

Skipton
Party	Candidate	Votes	%	±%
Unionist	Richard Roundell	12,676	39.9	−1.8
Liberal	Harry Verney	11,285	35.6	+3.3
Labour	George Willey	7,767	24.5	−1.5
Majority		1,391	4.3	−5.1
Turnout			83.6	−1.6
Unionist hold		Swing	-2.6	

Smethwick
Party	Candidate	Votes	%	±%
Labour	John Davison	13,550	54.7	+4.0
Unionist	Edmund Brocklebank	11,217	45.3	−4.0
Majority		2,333	9.4	+8.0
Turnout		24,767	71.7	−4.2
Labour hold		Swing	−4.0	

Southampton (2 seats)
Party	Candidate	Votes	%	±%
Unionist	Allen Bathurst	20,453	20.0	−2.0
Unionist	Edwin Perkins	20,249	19.8	−4.1
Labour	Tommy Lewis	17,208	16.9	+0.8
Labour	Reginald William Sorenson	16,679	16.4	n/a
Liberal	Francis Jefferies Spranger	13,724	13.5	+1.0
Liberal	Neville Dixey	13,657	13.4	+3.3
Majority				
Turnout			67.3	−1.2
Unionist hold		Swing		

Southend
Party	Candidate	Votes	%	±%
Unionist	Rupert Guinness	15,566	50.2	−11.7
Liberal	Douglas Young	15,453	49.8	+11.7
Majority		113	0.4	−23.4
Turnout			69.3	+1.3
Unionist hold		Swing	-11.7	

Southport
Party	Candidate	Votes	%	±%
Liberal	John Brunner	13,704	51.8	+5.0
Unionist	Thomas Comyn-Platt	12,776	48.2	−5.0
Majority		928	3.6	
Turnout		26,480	75.9	−0.4
Liberal gain from Unionist		Swing	+5.0	

South Molton
Party	Candidate	Votes	%	±%
Liberal	George Lambert	unopposed	n/a	n/a
Liberal hold		Swing	n/a	

South Shields
Party	Candidate	Votes	%	±%
Liberal	Edward Harney	22,912	59.3	+19.5
Labour	William Lawther	15,717	40.7	+1.0
Majority		7,195	18.6	+18.5
Turnout			73.5	
Liberal hold		Swing	+9.5	

Sowerby
Party	Candidate	Votes	%	±%
Liberal	Arnold Williams	11,350	39.6	+11.9
Unionist	William Simpson-Hinchliffe	9,932	34.6	−5.3
Labour	Arthur Dawson	7,389	25.8	+0.3
Majority		1,418	5.0	−7.2
Turnout			81.0	−2.9
Liberal gain from Unionist		Swing	+8.6	

Spelthorne
Party	Candidate	Votes	%	±%
Unionist	Philip Pilditch	11,604	66.41	+1.73
Labour	G.S. Cockrill	5,868	33.59	−1.73
Majority		5,736	32.83	+3.46
Turnout		17,472	45.95	−7.95
Unionist hold		Swing	+1.73	

Spennymoor
Party	Candidate	Votes	%	±%
Labour	Joseph Batey	15,567	65.7	+15.4
Unionist	William Appleby	8,116	34.3	+6.7
Majority		7,451	31.4	+8.7
Turnout			69.7	−11.5
Labour hold		Swing	+4.3	

Spen Valley
Party	Candidate	Votes	%	±%
Liberal	John Simon	13,672	40.6	+1.4
Labour	Tom Myers	12,597	37.4	+0.5
Unionist	Eugene Ramsden	7,390	22.0	–1.9
Majority		1,075	3.2	+0.9
Turnout			82.7	–1.9
Liberal hold		Swing	+0.5	

Stafford
Party	Candidate	Votes	%	±%
Unionist	William Ormsby-Gore	9,823	53.9	
Labour	William Thomas Scott	8,412	46.1	
Majority		1,411	7.8	
Turnout		18,235		
Unionist hold		Swing		

Stalybridge and Hyde
Party	Candidate	Votes	%	±%
Liberal	J. Lincoln Tattersall	17,082	53.7	+24.4
Unionist	John Rhodes	14,708	46.3	−2.8
Majority		2,374	7.4	27.2
Turnout			72.2	−8.9
Liberal gain from Unionist		Swing	+13.6	

Stockport (2 seats)
Party	Candidate	Votes	%	±%
Unionist	William Greenwood	20,308	22.4	−10.7
Liberal	Charles Royle	19,223	21.2	n/a
Unionist	Samuel Hammersley	18,129	20.0	n/a
Liberal	Henry Fildes	16,756	18.4	−16.0
Labour	Arnold Townend	16,340	18.0	+2.2
Majority		3,552	4.0	
Majority		1,094	1.2	
Turnout			71.7	−9.5
Unionist hold		Swing		
Liberal hold		Swing		

Stockton-on-Tees
Party	Candidate	Votes	%	±%
Liberal	Robert Strother Stewart	11,734	34.5	+6.8
Unionist	Harold Macmillan	11,661	34.3	n/a
Labour	Frederick Fox Riley	10,619	31.2	−3.1
Majority		73	0.2	3.9
Turnout			87.5	+1.6
Liberal gain from National Liberal		Swing	n/a	

Stoke-on-Trent
Party	Candidate	Votes	%	±%
Liberal	John Ward	13,119	51.2	−10.1
Labour	John Watts	12,502	48.8	+10.1
Majority		617	2.4	−20.2
Turnout			63.2	−4.8
Liberal hold		Swing	-10.1	

Stone
Party	Candidate	Votes	%	±%
Unionist	Joseph Lamb	10,001	50.8	
Liberal	Walter Meakin	9,687	49.2	
Majority		314	1.6	
Turnout		19,688		
Unionist hold		Swing		

Stourbridge
Party	Candidate	Votes	%	±%
Unionist	Douglas Pielou	14,764	39.8	
Liberal	Harry Evers Palfrey	13,269	35.8	
Labour	Wilfred Wellock	9,050	24.4	n/a
Majority		1,495	4.0	
Turnout		37,083		
Unionist hold		Swing		

Stretford
Party	Candidate	Votes	%	±%
Liberal	Thomas Robinson	15,971	58.2	−10.5
Labour	John Corlett	11,451	41.8	+10.5
Majority		4,520	16.4	−21.0
Liberal hold		Swing	-10.5	

Stroud
Party	Candidate	Votes	%	±%
Liberal	Frederick Guest	15,179	53.2	+21.9
Unionist	Stanley Tubbs	13,355	46.8	−4.3
Majority		1,824	6.4	26.2
Turnout			78.2	
Liberal gain from Unionist		Swing	+13.1	

Sudbury
Party	Candidate	Votes	%	±%
Liberal	Frederick Loverseed	8,813	52.0	+33.9
Unionist	Herbert Mercer	8,148	48.0	+1.0
Majority		665	4.0	−8.1
Turnout			63.8	+4.5
Liberal gain from Unionist		Swing	+16.5	

Sunderland (2 seats)
Party	Candidate	Votes	%	±%
Unionist	✓ Walter Raine	23,497	19.9	
Unionist	✓ Luke Thompson	23,379	19.8	
Liberal	Andrew Common	22,438	19.0	+7.3
Liberal	Hamar Greenwood	22,034	18.6	
Labour	David Baxter Lawley	13,707	11.6	−0.6
Labour	Thomas William Gillinder	13,184	11.1	−1.0
Majority		1,905	1.1	
Turnout			77.9	
Unionist hold		Swing		

Surrey East
Party	Candidate	Votes	%	±%
Unionist	James Galbraith	unopposed	n/a	n/a
Unionist hold		Swing	n/a	

Swindon
Party	Candidate	Votes	%	±%
Unionist	Reginald Mitchell Banks	12,625	45.1	
Labour	Holford Knight	9,121	32.6	
Liberal	Walter Rocke	6,231	22.3	n/a
Majority		3,504	12.5	−0.3
Turnout			82.8	
Unionist hold		Swing		

Tamworth
Party	Candidate	Votes	%	±%
Unionist	Edward Iliffe	unopposed	n/a	n/a
Unionist hold		Swing	n/a	

Taunton
Party	Candidate	Votes	%	±%
Liberal	John Hope Simpson	13,053	52.5	−3.9
Unionist	Andrew Gault	11,798	47.5	+3.9
Majority		1,255	5.0	−7.8
Turnout			82.6	+3.5
Liberal hold		Swing	-3.9	

Tavistock
Party	Candidate	Votes	%	±%
Liberal	Maxwell Thornton	11,883	54.1	−0.4
Unionist	Philip Kenyon-Slaney	10,072	45.9	+0.4
Majority		1,811	8.2	−0.8
Turnout			77.7	+0.1
Liberal hold		Swing	-0.4	

Thirsk and Malton
Party	Candidate	Votes	%	±%
Unionist	Edmund Turton	11,545	62.5	n/a
Liberal	William Haughton Sessions	6,939	37.5	n/a
Majority		4,606	25.0	n/a
Turnout		18,484		n/a
Unionist hold		Swing	n/a	

Thornbury
Party	Candidate	Votes	%	±%
Liberal	Athelstan Rendall	16,722	62.0	+22.8
Unionist	Herbert Charles Woodcock	10,252	38.0	−1.5
Majority		6,470	24.0	24.3
Turnout		26,974	75.6	−2.3
Liberal gain from Unionist		Swing	+12.2	

Tiverton
Party	Candidate	Votes	%	±%
Liberal	Francis Dyke Acland	12,303	50.0	+3.5
Unionist	Gilbert Acland-Troyte	12,300	50.0	+3.1
Majority		3	0.0	+0.4
Turnout			87.4	+7.3
Liberal gain from Unionist		Swing	+0.2	

Tonbridge
Party	Candidate	Votes	%	±%
Unionist	Herbert Spender-Clay	13,910	49.8	−3.2
Liberal	Albert Charles Crane	7,433	26.6	+7.0
Labour	Joseph Thomas Davis	6,610	23.6	−3.8
Majority		6,477	23.2	−2.4
Turnout			70.6	−1.9
Unionist hold		Swing	-5.1	

Torquay
Party	Candidate	Votes	%	±%
Liberal	P. Gilchrist Thompson	15,294	50.6	+2.8
Unionist	Charles Williams	14,922	49.4	−2.8
Majority		372	1.2	5.6
Turnout			80.0	+1.5
Liberal gain from Unionist		Swing	+2.8	

Totnes
Party	Candidate	Votes	%	±%
Liberal	Henry Vivian	16,845	50.8	+3.2
Unionist	Samuel Harvey	16,343	49.2	−3.2
Majority		502	1.6	6.4
Turnout			80.7	+2.6
Liberal gain from Unionist		Swing	+3.2	

Tottenham North
Party	Candidate	Votes	%	±%
Labour	Robert Morrison	12,696	49.7	+5.5
Unionist	William Prescott	8,323	32.6	−3.5
Liberal	Oliver Frederick Broadway	4,525	17.7	n/a
Majority		4,373	17.1	+9.0
Turnout			69.3	+3.9
Labour hold		Swing	+4.5	

Tottenham South
Party	Candidate	Votes	%	±%
Labour	Percy Alden	10,312	46.9	+9.8
Unionist	Patrick Malone	7,687	35.0	−9.5
Liberal	Alfred George Newell	3,974	18.1	−0.3
Majority		2,625	11.9	+4.5
Turnout			62.5	−1.3
Labour gain from Unionist		Swing		

Twickenham
Party	Candidate	Votes	%	±%
Unionist	William Joynson-Hicks	12,903	55.4	n/a
Labour	Stanley Simon Sherman	5,509	23.7	n/a
Liberal	Charles Baker	4,858	20.9	n/a
Majority		7,394	31.7	n/a
Turnout		23,270		n/a
Unionist hold		Swing	n/a	

Tynemouth
Party	Candidate	Votes	%	±%
Unionist	Alexander Russell	9,612	41.0	−7.1
Liberal	Harry Barnes	9,008	38.3	+9.3
Labour	W. Pitt	4,875	20.7	−2.2
Turnout			81.1	−2.4
Majority		604	2.7	−16.4
Unionist hold		Swing	-8.2	

Uxbridge
Party	Candidate	Votes	%	±%
Unionist	Dennistoun Burney	9,254	40.6	−12.1
Liberal	Graham Seton Hutchison	7,423	32.5	+16.2
Labour	Robert Small	6,146	26.9	−4.1
Majority		1,831	8.1	−13.6
Turnout			66.6	−6.4
Unionist hold		Swing	-14.2	

Wakefield
Party	Candidate	Votes	%	±%
Labour	George Sherwood	7,966	39.9	−8.6
Unionist	Geoffrey Ellis	7,345	36.8	−14.7
Liberal	Eric John Lassen	4,640	23.3	n/a
Majority		621	3.1	6.1
Turnout			80.9	
Labour gain from Unionist		Swing	+3.0	

Wallasey
Party	Candidate	Votes	%	±%
Unionist	Robert Burton-Chadwick	13,995	51.6	−12.1
Liberal	Tudor Morris	13,146	48.4	+12.1
Majority		849	3.2	−24.2
Turnout			67.2	−2.0
Unionist hold		Swing	-12.1	

Wallsend
Party	Candidate	Votes	%	±%
Labour	Patrick Hastings	16,126	55.5	
Unionist	Christopher Lowther	12,950	44.5	
Majority		3,176	11.0	
Turnout		29,076		
Labour hold		Swing		

Walsall
Party	Candidate	Votes	%	±%
Liberal	Pat Collins	16,304	43.5	−4.9
Unionist	Sydney Kersland Lewis	14,141	37.8	−0.0
Labour	Arthur Carr Osburn	7,007	18.7	−4.9
Majority		2,163	5.7	+4.9
Turnout			82.6	
Liberal hold		Swing	-2.4	

Walthamstow East
Party	Candidate	Votes	%	±%
Unionist	Stanley Johnson	7,081	35.9	−10.9
Labour	John Gilbert Dale	6,837	34.6	+2.0
Liberal	Arthur Musgrove Mathews	5,837	29.5	+8.9
Majority		244	1.3	−12.9
Turnout			67.8	+0.2
Unionist hold		Swing	-6.4	

Walthamstow West
Party	Candidate	Votes	%	±%
Labour	Valentine McEntee	10,026	47.6	+4.3
Liberal	Horace Crawfurd	8,234	39.0	+13.2
Unionist	Jabeez Lyne	2,832	13.4	n/a
Majority		1,792	8.6	−3.8
Turnout			65.5	
Labour hold		Swing	-4.5	

Wansbeck
Party	Candidate	Votes	%	±%
Labour	George Warne	18,583	56.8	
Unionist	Hilton Philipson	14,131	43.2	
Majority		4,452	13.6	
Turnout		32,714		
Labour hold		Swing		

Warrington
Party	Candidate	Votes	%	±%
Labour	Charles Dukes	12,984	43.6	−3.3
Unionist	Alec Cunningham-Reid	12,314	41.3	−11.8
Liberal	John Francis Crowley	4,511	15.1	n/a
Majority		670	2.3	8.9
Turnout			86.1	
Labour gain from Unionist		Swing	+4.4	

Warwick and Leamington
Party	Candidate	Votes	%	±%
Unionist	Anthony Eden	16,337	51.8	n/a
Liberal	George Nicholls	11,134	35.4	n/a
Labour	Daisy Greville	4,015	12.8	n/a
Majority		5,203	16.4	n/a
Turnout			72.9	n/a
Unionist hold		Swing	n/a	

Watford
Party	Candidate	Votes	%	±%
Unionist	Dennis Herbert	10,533	43.0	−6.2
Labour	James Joseph Mallon	7,532	30.8	−4.1
Liberal	Robert Allen Bateman	6,423	26.2	+10.3
Majority		3,001	12.2	−2.1
Turnout			68.5	−0.5
Unionist hold		Swing	-1.0	

Waterloo
Party	Candidate	Votes	%	±%
Unionist	Malcolm Bullock	10,615	51.6	
Liberal	Robert Lowden Connell	9,965	48.4	
Majority		650	3.2	
Turnout		20,580	72.6	
Unionist hold		Swing		

Wednesbury
Party	Candidate	Votes	%	±%
Labour	Alfred Short	17,810	51.5	+1.3
Unionist	Herbert Williams	16,791	48.5	−1.3
Majority		1,019	3.0	+2.6
Turnout			88.7	
Labour hold		Swing	+1.3	

Wellingborough
Party	Candidate	Votes	%	±%
Labour	William Cove	11,175	42.1	−0.3
Liberal	Geoffrey Shakespeare	8,638	32.5	−25.1
Unionist	Robert Massy-Dawson Sanders	6,747	25.4	n/a
Majority		2,537	9.6	24.8
Turnout			79.9	
Labour gain from Liberal		Swing	+12.4	

Wells
Party	Candidate	Votes	%	±%
Liberal	Arthur Hobhouse	10,818	48.2	+14.8
Unionist	Robert Bruford	9,909	44.2	−3.5
Labour	Charles Henry Whitlow	1,713	7.6	−11.3
Majority		909	4.0	18.3
Turnout			79.1	+1.3
Liberal gain from Unionist		Swing	+9.1	

Wentworth
Party	Candidate	Votes	%	±%
Labour	George Harry Hirst	Unopposed	n/a	n/a
Labour hold		Swing	n/a	

West Bromwich
Party	Candidate	Votes	%	±%
Labour	Frederick Roberts	12,910	44.8	−5.8
Unionist	Herbert Edgar Parkes	11,146	38.7	−1.4
Liberal	Aneurin Edwards	4,749	16.5	+7.2
Majority		1,764	6.1	−4.4
Turnout			85.0	
Labour hold		Swing	-2.2	

Westbury
Party	Candidate	Votes	%	±%
Liberal	Charles Darbishire	10,867	43.2	+1.5
Unionist	Walter Shaw	9,891	39.4	+0.4
Labour	George Ward	4,372	17.4	−1.9
Majority		976	3.8	+1.1
Turnout			83.5	+2.5
Liberal hold		Swing	+0.6	

West Ham Plaistow
Party	Candidate	Votes	%	±%
Labour	Will Thorne	13,638	74.6	+11.3
Unionist	George Penny	4,643	25.4	−11.3
Majority		8995	49.2	+22.6
Turnout		18,281	49.9	−4.8
Labour hold		Swing	+11.3	

West Ham Silvertown
Party	Candidate	Votes	%	±%
Labour	Jack Jones	12,777	81.3	+8.2
Unionist	Charles George Lewis	2,948	18.7	−8.2
Majority		9,829	62.6	+16.4
Turnout			45.9	
Labour hold		Swing	+8.2	

West Ham Stratford
Party	Candidate	Votes	%	±%
Labour	Thomas Groves	11466	55.1	+8.3
Unionist	Victor Fisher	5,443	26.2	−14.3
Liberal	William Crow	3,888	18.7	+6.0
Majority		6,023	28.9	+22.6
Turnout			61.8	−3.1
Labour hold		Swing	+11.3	

West Ham Upton
Party	Candidate	Votes	%	±%
Labour	Benjamin Gardner	8,656	39.3	+6.5
Unionist	David Margesson	7,630	34.7	−11.3
Liberal	John Charles Carroll	5,710	26.0	+4.8
Majority		1,026	4.6	17.8
Turnout			67.2	−2.2
Labour gain from Unionist		Swing	+8.9	

Westhoughton
Party	Candidate	Votes	%	±%
Labour	Rhys Davies	15,347	60.3	
Unionist	John Haslam	10,103	39.7	
Majority		5,244	20.6	
Turnout			79.3	
Labour hold		Swing		

Westmorland
Party	Candidate	Votes	%	±%
Unionist	John Weston	unopposed	n/a	n/a
Unionist hold		Swing	n/a	

Weston-super-Mare
Party	Candidate	Votes	%	±%
Liberal	Frank Murrell	15,223	51.5	+6.6
Unionist	John Erskine	14,318	48.5	−6.6
Majority		905	3.0	13.2
Liberal gain from Unionist		Swing	+6.6	

Whitehaven
Party	Candidate	Votes	%	±%
Labour	Thomas Gavan-Duffy	12,419	53.0	
Unionist	Robert Spear Hudson	11,029	47.0	
Majority		1,390	6.0	−2.1
Turnout			83.1	
Labour hold		Swing	-1.0	

Widnes
Party	Candidate	Votes	%	±%
Unionist	Christopher Clayton	12,808	47.1	−6.1
Labour	Joseph Patrick Cotter	12,020	44.2	−2.6
Liberal	Harry Trevor Ellis	2,355	8.7	n/a
Majority		788	2.9	−3.5
Turnout			83.0	−3.8
Unionist hold		Swing	-1.7	

Wigan
Party	Candidate	Votes	%	±%
Labour	John Parkinson	19,637	57.6	+1.1
Unionist	David Lindsay	14,451	42.4	−1.1
Majority		5,186	15.2	+2.2
Turnout			85.0	
Labour hold		Swing	+1.1	

Willesden East
Party	Candidate	Votes	%	±%
Liberal	Harcourt Johnstone	11,260	40.5	−6.7
Unionist	George Stanley	11,146	40.1	−12.7
Labour	Joseph George Butler	5,392	19.4	n/a
Majority		114	0.4	6.0
Turnout			68.1	+9.7
Liberal gain from Unionist		Swing	+3.0	

Willesden West
Party	Candidate	Votes	%	±%
Labour	Samuel Viant	14,004	51.3	+2.8
Unionist	George James Furness	8,256	30.3	−18.2
Liberal	David Cleghorn Thomson	5,030	18.4	n/a
Majority		5,748	21.0	24.0
Turnout			69.1	+1.4
Labour gain from Unionist		Swing	+12.0	

Wimbledon
Party	Candidate	Votes	%	±%
Unionist	Joseph Hood	15,495	69.8	−1.9
Labour	Mark Starr	6,717	30.2	+1.9
Majority		8,778	39.6	−3.8
Turnout			57.3	
Unionist hold		Swing	-1.9	

Winchester
Party	Candidate	Votes	%	±%
Unionist	George Hennessy	11,240	46.8	
Labour	Albert Reginald Stamp	6,495	27.1	
Liberal	William West	6,252	26.1	
Majority		4,745	19.7	−10.9
Turnout			67.9	
Unionist hold		Swing		

Windsor
Party	Candidate	Votes	%	±%
Unionist	Annesley Somerville	12,648	58.4	−12.8
Liberal	Charles Benjamin Crisp	9,023	41.6	+12.8
Majority		3,625	16.7	−25.6
Turnout		21,671	57.1	−8.6
Unionist hold		Swing	+12.8	

Wirral
Party	Candidate	Votes	%	±%
Liberal	Stephen Roxby Dodds	13,631	53.6	+21.9
Unionist	Gershom Stewart	11,791	46.4	−4.6
Majority		1,840	7.2	26.5
Turnout			71.6	−2.4
Liberal gain from Unionist		Swing	+13.3	

Wolverhampton Bilston
Party	Candidate	Votes	%	±%
Unionist	Charles Howard-Bury	10,186	41.6	
Labour	John Baker	9,085	37.1	
Liberal	John Prentice	5,205	21.3	n/a
Majority		1,101	4.5	−3.9
Turnout			74.9	
Unionist hold		Swing	-1.9	

Wolverhampton East
Party	Candidate	Votes	%	±%
Liberal	George Thorne	unopposed	n/a	n/a
Liberal hold		Swing	n/a	

Wolverhampton West
Party	Candidate	Votes	%	±%
Unionist	Robert Bird	15,990	50.4	−3.5
Labour	William Brown	15,749	49.6	+3.5
Majority		241	0.8	−7.0
Turnout		31,739	79.5	−4.0
Unionist hold		Swing	−3.5	

Woodbridge
Party	Candidate	Votes	%	±%
Unionist	Arthur Churchman	10,606	46.7	−10.0
Liberal	William Rowley Elliston	7,328	32.2	n/a
Labour	E. J. C. Neep	4,810	21.1	−22.2
Majority		3,278	14.5	+1.1
Turnout			70.9	+1.8
Unionist hold		Swing	n/a	

Wood Green
Party	Candidate	Votes	%	±%
Unionist	Godfrey Locker-Lampson	15,344	46.5	−23.5
Liberal	John Traill Stevenson	11,975	36.3	n/a
Labour	James Bacon	5,665	17.2	−12.8
Majority		3,369	10.2	−29.8
Turnout			69.1	+2.6
Unionist hold		Swing		

Worcester
Party	Candidate	Votes	%	±%
Unionist	Crawford Greene	10,971	50.9	+2.9
Liberal	Richard Robert Fairbairn	9,743	45.3	−6.7
Labour	Percy Williams	815	3.8	n/a
Majority		1,228	5.6	9.6
Turnout			85.8	
Unionist gain from Liberal		Swing	+4.8	

Workington
Party	Candidate	Votes	%	±%
Labour	Thomas Cape	15,296	56.5	+3.6
Unionist	Lancelot Evelyn Gaunt	11,781	43.5	−3.6
Majority		3,515	13.0	+7.2
Turnout			83.5	
Labour hold		Swing	+3.6	

The Wrekin
Party	Candidate	Votes	%	±%
Labour	Henry Nixon	11657	53.2	+5.6
Unionist	Arthur Nicholas Fielden	10274	46.8	−20.1
Majority		1383	6.4	+11.2
Turnout			66.0	
Labour hold		Swing	+5.6	

Wycombe
Party	Candidate	Votes	%	±%
Liberal	Vera Woodhouse	14,910	46.9	+11.1
Unionist	William Baring du Pré	13,228	41.7	−8.4
Labour	George Young	3,611	11.4	−2.7
Majority		1,682	5.2	19.5
Turnout			68.2	−1.0
Liberal gain from Unionist		Swing	+9.8	

Yeovil
Party	Candidate	Votes	%	±%
Unionist	George Davies	12,690	44.5	−17.3
Liberal	Charles Waley Cohen	10,715	37.6	n/a
Labour	William Kelly	5,080	17.8	−20.5
Majority		1,975	6.9	−20.4
Turnout				
Unionist hold		Swing	n/a	

York
Party	Candidate	Votes	%	±%
Unionist	John Marriott	14,772	43.4	−1.1
Labour	Joseph King	11,626	34.2	+4.6
Liberal	Elliott Dodds	7638	22.4	n/a
Majority		3,146	9.2	−5.7
Turnout			82.8	+0.3
Unionist hold		Swing	-2.8	
