= George Ward (Liberal politician) =

The Honourable George Ward JP

Member of Parliament for Bosworth
- In office 6 December 1923 – 9 October 1924
- Preceded by: Guy Paget
- Succeeded by: Robert Gee

Personal details
- Born: 14 January 1879 Barwell, Leicestershire, United Kingdom
- Died: 3 December 1951 (aged 72)
- Citizenship: British
- Party: Liberal
- Spouse: Emily Haydon
- Education: Barwell National School
- Occupation: Boot and Shoe Manufacturer

George Ward JP (14 January 1879 – 3 December 1951) was a British Liberal Party politician and boot manufacturer.

== Biography ==
Ward was educated at Barwell National School in Leicestershire. On 10 June 1905 he married Emily Haydon. In business Ward was a highly successful Boot and Shoe Manufacturer but he also served in local politics as a Parish, District and County Councillor, later an Alderman and as a justice of the peace. In 1923 he was elected as the member of parliament (MP) for Bosworth. He held the seat until the 1924 election.

He died in Hinckley aged 72, when his address was Rosslyn, Barwell, near Leicester.

== Legacy ==
In his Will, George Ward left his former home, the Cedars to the people of Barwell, which was used as an educational establishment for a number of years, until it was vacated in 2002 due to subsidence problems. After a number of years, the George Ward Community Centre was opened in the village using the money from the sale of the Cedars, and was so-named in honour of George Ward's contribution to the village.

Parliament of the United Kingdom
Preceded by Guy Paget	Member of Parliament for Bosworth; 1923–1924	Succeeded by Robert Gee
