= Guy Paget =

Major Guy Paget

Member of Parliament for Bosworth
- In office 15 November 1922 – 16 November 1923
- Preceded by: Henry McLaren
- Succeeded by: George Ward

Personal details
- Born: Thomas Guy Frederick Paget; 29 July 1886
- Died: 12 March 1952 (aged 65)
- Party: Conservative
- Relations: Reginald Paget (son); Thomas Paget (great-grandfather); Thomas Paget (great-uncle)

Major Thomas Guy Frederick Paget (29 July 1886 – 12 March 1952), was a British soldier and Conservative Party politician.

Paget was the son of Thomas Guy Paget, of Ibstock, Leicestershire. His great-grandfather Thomas Paget, of Lubenham, was a banker and represented Leicestershire in Parliament while his great-uncle, also named Thomas Paget, represented Leicestershire South and Harborough. Paget sat as Member of Parliament for Bosworth from 1922 to 1923.

During the 1922 general election campaign, Paget stood on an anti-German platform. Historians such as M.S.R. Kinnear have suggested that this position resonated with the Bosworth electorate. He gained 40.9% of the vote.

Paget also wrote historical biographies of Medieval women, The Rose of Raby (about Cecily Neville), The Rose of London (about Jane Shore) and The Rose of Rouen (about Elizabeth Woodville).

Paget died in March 1952, aged 65. His son Reginald was also a politician, for the Labour Party.

Parliament of the United Kingdom
Preceded by Hon. Henry McLaren	Member of Parliament for Bosworth; 1922 – 1923	Succeeded by George Ward
