= Woolwich East by-election =

Woolwich East by-election may refer to one of two by-elections held for the British House of Commons constituency of Woolwich East:

- 1921 Woolwich East by-election
- 1931 Woolwich East by-election
- 1951 Woolwich East by-election

== See also ==
- Woolwich East (UK Parliament constituency)
- Woolwich West by-election (disambiguation)
