= 1927 Bosworth by-election =

UK parliamentary by-election

The 1927 Bosworth by-election was a parliamentary by-election for the UK House of Commons constituency of Bosworth in Leicestershire on Tuesday, 31 May 1927.

== Vacancy ==
The by-election was triggered by the resignation of the sitting Conservative MP, Robert Gee. Gee had formerly been the MP for Woolwich East from 1921-22 and had retained his Bosworth seat since the 1924 general election. He was clearly disillusioned with parliamentarian life, as he was reported to have been absent from his political duties for over a year at the time of the by-election; having emigrated to the backwoods of Western Australia with no intention of returning home.

== Previous result ==
General election, 29 October 1924 Bosworth Electorate: 35,925
Party	Candidate	Votes	%	±%
Conservative	Robert Gee	10,114	34.9	+5.0
Liberal	George Ward	9,756	33.6	−7.6
Labour	John Minto	9,143	31.5	+2.6
Majority		358	1.3	N/A
Turnout		29,013	80.8	+0.5
Conservative gain from Liberal		Swing	+6.3	

Bosworth was clearly a three-way marginal at this time. It had been won by a Coalition Liberal in 1918, a Tory in 1922, was Liberal in 1923 and Conservative again in 1924. Although Labour had not yet won the seat, the party consistently polled about a third of the vote in all these recent contests, coming second in 1922.

== Candidates ==
=== Conservatives ===
The Conservatives selected 40-year-old Brigadier General Edward Spears, a noted First World War soldier who had been head of the British Military Mission in Paris and who was from 1922 to 1924 the National Liberal MP for Loughborough.

=== Liberals ===
The Liberals chose Sir William Edge, a 45-year-old manufacturer who had been MP for Bolton from 1916 to 1923 and was a former government whip.

=== Labour ===
The Labour Party settled upon John Minto, originally from Kilmarnock a member of Leicester City Council since 1922 and an engineer working for Leicester Co-operative Society.

== Issues ==
In 1926 the retirement of H H Asquith as Liberal leader and his replacement by Lloyd George began to turn the tide for the Liberals. In March 1927, they gained a Labour seat in a by-election at Southwark North.

Spears began the campaign with a public announcement that the political tide was running in favour of the government and the Conservative Party. The major issue throughout the campaign was the Trade Unions Bill, a measure brought in following the General Strike of 1926 which outlawed secondary strike action and any strike whose purpose was to coerce the government of the day directly or indirectly. He attacked Minto and Edge for opposing the Bill. In so doing he tried to paint Edge as a socialist who stood against Parliamentary government and the liberty of the workers. He also began by offering himself as the party of safeguarding of industry.

Edge's supporters too entered the campaign with public declarations of forthcoming victory and Spears’ team seemed less inclined to predict a good result than their candidate. Labour were also confident but wary of making an early public announcement of their prospects. Minto hoped to make headway on the Trade Unions Bill in the Coalville area of the constituency. The town was the main coal mining centre, where nearly a third of the electorate of the constituency lived and Labour stronghold on the local Urban District Council. He attacked the Bill vehemently. Edge tried to steer a middle path on the trades disputes issue, accusing the Labour Party of bringing the law on themselves by their behaviour over the general strike but attacking the Tories for damaging industrial relations and trade and inviting accusations of class animosity.

The letters sent by the Labour and Conservative party leaders to their candidates concentrated almost exclusively on the Trade Union Bill. Ramsay MacDonald called it a "disruptive and partisan attack upon the trades unions" and appealed to the electors of Bosworth to reject this "attack upon the workers". The prime minister Stanley Baldwin called the bill, "the great issue before the country at the present time". He said it was a measure against "tyranny and intimidation" and urged those who valued "the maintenance of the democratic institutions of [the] country" to vote for Spears.

== Campaign strengths ==
When the candidates’ nominations which had been handed into the Returning Officer were made public on 23 May 1927, it was the Liberals who seemed to have the advantage if the numbers of supporting signatures was an accurate reflection of opinion in the contest. The Liberals had submitted 330 nomination sheets, signed by 3,300 electors in the constituency. They claimed that one was signed wholly by former Conservative voters and one signed wholly by trade unionists. They had submitted 75 papers signed by 750 electors from the Coalville electoral districts where the voters were largely miners, which would have been seen as a blow to Labour hopes. Compared to this show of support, Spears put in 66 papers, including some signed by ex-Liberals and Minto submitted 33. In other indications of the way things were going, Lloyd George addressed a crowd estimated at 10,000 strong in Coalville, while Arthur Henderson attracted about one quarter of that number for Labour; and one reporter who travelled through the constituency estimated that Liberal window bills in private houses outnumbered those of their rivals by more than twenty times.

It is also difficult to estimate the success or otherwise of election publicity but Edge appears to have scored a goal with the working class electorate when he arranged for the visit to the constituency of two former professional football players with Bolton Wanderers. Edge had an association with the club from his former time as MP for the city and the men supported his candidacy from friendship and on the basis of his personal qualities as good man and a ‘good sport’.

== Zinoviev letter ==
The by-election also re-awakened the divisive issue of the Zinoviev letter a controversial document published by the British press in 1924, allegedly sent from the Communist International in Moscow to the Communist Party of Great Britain. The letter, took its name from Bolshevik revolutionary Grigory Zinoviev. Later revealed to be a forgery, purported to be a directive from Moscow calling for intensified Communist agitation in Britain and helped ensure the fall of the MacDonald's Labour government at the 1924 general election. In his letter of support to Minto, Ramsay MacDonald referred to the Conservatives as “having gained its Parliamentary power by a trick.“ This provoked a letter to The Times from Walter Blake Odgers (1880-1969), a barrister at the Middle Temple claiming this was a reference to the Zinoviev letter and re-opening the controversy. MacDonald responded with his own letter, again accusing the Tories of having “created a stampede of fear in the minds of the electorate.” A number of developments followed, further letters to the press, a speech by J. R. Clynes at Manchester accusing the government of making political capital from forgery and a letter to Spears from the Home Secretary, Sir William Joynson-Hicks accusing Labour of continually displaying the utmost sympathy for the Russian Communists. Edge tried to take advantage of this Tory-Labour spat and the fears of socialism that it evoked by painting Minto as being supported by extremist elements in his party. Edge appealed to moderate electors to vote for him “or they [would] hand over the Bosworth division as a gift to the Reds.”

== Final days ==
Liberal confidence was beginning to wane with the approach of polling day, although on the eve of poll, Edge declared the race was between himself and the Labour man. However it was reported that only the Conservatives had managed to compete a thorough canvass of the whole constituency and that their organisation was better developed and more effectively directed than the other parties. Spears announced that on the basis of the canvass returns he was sure to win. Labour now sounded more self-assured as well, more optimistic about the turnout from the Labour and mining areas around Coalville and predicting a victory over the Liberals with Spears at the bottom of the poll. Edge's supporters would go no further than saying the result was ‘fifty-fifty’ between their candidate and the Labour Party.

== Result ==
The result was a narrow victory for Sir William Edge by 271 votes over Labour, gaining the seat from the Conservatives. At the 1924 general election Robert Gee had had a majority of 358 votes over the Liberal candidate. The turnout in the by-election was 84.6%. The result was declared after an understandable Labour call for a recount.

By-election 1927: Bosworth
Party	Candidate	Votes	%	±%
Liberal	William Edge	11,981	38.2	+4.6
Labour	John Minto	11,710	37.3	+5.8
Conservative	Edward Spears	7,685	24.5	−10.4
Majority		271	0.9	N/A
Turnout		31,376	84.6	+3.8
Liberal gain from Conservative		Swing	+7.5	

== Aftermath ==
Edge's victory at Bosworth was followed at Lancaster, St Ives and Eddisbury by further gains. These results caused the Conservatives to fear the possibility of a Liberal revival but they should however have been more worried about the rise of Labour. Over the course of the 1924-1929 Parliament, Labour made thirteen by-election gains in all, eleven from the Tories, and two from the Liberals and went on to win the 1929 general election.

General election, 30 May 1929 Electorate: 47,912
Party	Candidate	Votes	%	±%
Liberal	William Edge	17,044	41.4	+7.9
Labour	John Minto	15,244	37.0	+5.5
Conservative	Sydney Lipscomb Elborne	8,861	21.6	−13.4
Majority		1,800	4.4	N/A
Turnout		41,149	85.9	+5.1
Liberal gain from Unionist		Swing	+10.7	

Labour had to wait until 1945 however before finally gaining Bosworth.

== See also ==
- List of United Kingdom by-elections
- United Kingdom by-election records
