= Dennis Walters =

British politician (1928–2021)

Sir Dennis Walters MBE

Member of Parliament for Westbury
- In office 15 October 1964 – 16 March 1992
- Preceded by: Robert Grimston
- Succeeded by: David Faber

Personal details
- Born: Dennis Murray Walters; 28 November 1928 Kingdom of Italy
- Died: 1 October 2021 (aged 92)
- Party: Conservative
- Spouse(s): Vanora McIndoe (m. 1955; div. 1969) Celia Sandys (m. 1970; div. 1979) Bridgett Shearer (m. 1981; div. 2004)
- Children: 5
- Education: St Catharine's College, Cambridge

Sir Dennis Murray Walters MBE (28 November 1928 – 1 October 2021) was a British Conservative Party politician who served as the Member of Parliament (MP) for Westbury from 1964 to 1992.

== Early life ==
The son of Douglas L. Walters and Clara Walters (née Pomello), Walters was of English and Italian descent and born in Italy. He was brought up as a Roman Catholic.

At the outbreak of the Second World War he was in Italy and was interned, but after the Armistice of Cassibile he was released and served for eleven months with the Italian Resistance in Florence. During this time he made the acquaintance of several notable partisans, including Giorgio Amendola, Bruno Sanguinetti, Sanguinetti's future wife Teresa "Chicchi" Mattei and her brother Gianfranco, and the Action Party leaders Carlo Ludovico Ragghianti and Gigi Alemani.

He then returned to England and was educated at Downside School and St Catharine's College, Cambridge, where he read Modern Languages (French and Italian) as an Exhibitioner and completed an MA.

== Career ==
In the late 1950s, Walters was employed as personal assistant to the Conservative peer Lord Hailsham throughout his chairmanship of the Conservative Party.

At the 1959 general election, Walters contested Blyth for the Conservatives, fighting the seat again the next year at a by-election after Alf Robens was appointed to the House of Lords. In October 1962, he was selected as his party's candidate for the Conservative-held safe seat of Westbury, which he represented as Member of Parliament (MP) for 28 years from 1964 onwards. During his early years in the Commons, he worked closely with Shadow Foreign Secretary Sir Alec Douglas-Home, of whom he later wrote "I could not imagine a more considerate, fair, or civilised person to serve."

Following the Six-Day War of 1967, Walters visited Palestine with his parliamentary colleague Ian Gilmour, and in a joint statement they said "The Israeli attitude to the refugees becomes clearer when their return rather than their expulsion is considered. Most people in Britain probably believe that Israel has agreed to their return and that repatriation is now satisfactorily proceeding. Nothing could be further from the truth." This was an early signal of the willingness of Walters and Gilmour to work closely together to explain the Arab point of view to the Western world, and they became close allies.

Outside parliament, Walters served as Chairman of Middle East International, founded in 1971 by Christopher Mayhew with "a mission to provide authoritative and independent news and analysis on the Middle East." A sympathiser with Arab interests, from 1970 to 1982 he was Chairman of the Council for the Advancement of Arab-British Understanding and from 1978 to 1981 joint Chairman of the Euro-Arab Parliamentary Association. He was also a company director with interests in investment, advertising, public relations and travel.

== Establishment of the Conservative Middle East Council (CMEC) ==
In 1980, Walters established the Conservative Middle East Council, primarily to help give a voice to Conservatives who supported Palestinian self-determination. In 1967, following the Six Day War, Sir Dennis had visited the region with his Conservative colleague and close political ally, Ian Gilmour, to argue for the return of Palestinian refugees.

The establishment of CMEC by Sir Dennis followed the Venice Declaration of June 1980, when the then nine members of the European Economic Community registered their concern over the continued building of settlements in the Occupied Palestinian Territories.

Sir Dennis and other Conservatives also viewed continued settlement building in the Occupied Territories as an obstacle to peace and resolved that the traditional ties and common interests which link Europe to the Middle East obliged them to play a special role in working towards a lasting peace.

Sir Dennis was CMEC’s first Chairman and a decade later became its president. Knighted in 1988, Sir Dennis was an outspoken critic of certain aspects of the government’s foreign policy in the Middle East, not least its decision to lend its support the US bombing of Libya, which was carried out in April 1986 in retaliation for Tripoli-sponsored acts of terrorism.

When the Conservatives returned to government in 1979, Walters's well-known pro-Arabism cost him the chance of advancement as a Foreign Office minister, the area in which his hopes lay, as in the shape of Gilmour, Margaret Thatcher was willing to appoint one pro-Arab colleague, but not two.

From 1965 to the 1990s, he served as a Governor of the British Institute of Florence. Walters retired from parliament in 1992, to be succeeded as member for Westbury by David Faber.

== Honours ==
In 1960, Walters was appointed MBE for political services. He was knighted in 1988, made a Commander of the National Order of the Cedar of Lebanon in 1969, and a Grande Ufficiale of the Ordine al Merito Repubblica (Italy) in 2012.

== Personal life ==
Walters was married three times: firstly in 1955 to Vanora McIndoe, a daughter of the surgeon Sir Archibald McIndoe (divorced 1969); secondly in 1970 to Celia Sandys, daughter of the politician Duncan Sandys (divorced 1979); and thirdly, in 1981, to Bridgett Shearer, daughter of the late J. Francis Shearer (divorced 2004). By his first wife, he had a son and daughter; by his second wife, a son, and by his third wife, a daughter and son. He lived in Chelsea.

He was a member of the Boodle's, Hurlingham and Queen's clubs. Walters' memoirs, Not Always with the Pack, were published in 1989, and translated into a revised Italian edition, which was issued in 1991.

Walters died on 1 October 2021, at the age of 92.

== Publications ==
- Not Always with the Pack. United Kingdom, Constable, 1989. ISBN 9780094693104
- Benedetti Inglesi Benedetti Italiani (Italian translation, revised edition), 1991.

== Sources ==
- The Times Guide to the House of Commons, Times Newspapers Ltd, 1966, 1987 & 1992
- Leigh Rayment's Peerage Pages

Parliament of the United Kingdom
Preceded by Robert Grimston	Member of Parliament for Westbury; 1964–1992	Succeeded by David Faber
