= 1921 Woolwich East by-election =

UK parliamentary by-election

- 2 March 1921

Candidate	Gee	MacDonald
Party	Unionist	Labour
Popular vote	13,724	13,041
Percentage	51.3%	48.7%
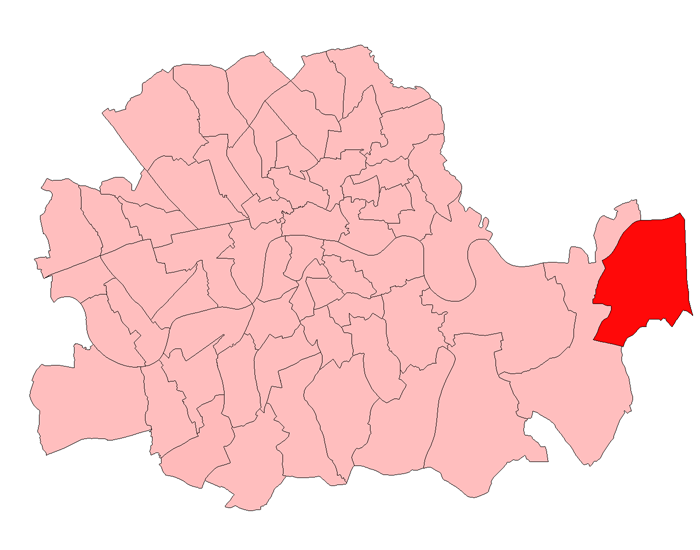
MP before election
Crooks
Labour
Subsequent MP
Gee
Unionist

The 1921 Woolwich East by-election was a parliamentary by-election held on 2 March 1921 for the British House of Commons constituency of Woolwich East, in the Metropolitan Borough of Woolwich in London.

== Vacancy ==
The seat had become vacant on the resignation of the constituency's Labour Member of Parliament (MP), Will Crooks, due to ill-health. Crooks was a noted trade unionist and working-class organiser, and had represented Woolwich East and its predecessor seat, Woolwich, since a by-election in 1903, with a gap between the two general elections of 1910.

1918 general election: Woolwich East
Party	Candidate	Votes	%	±%
Labour	Will Crooks	Unopposed	N/A	N/A
Labour hold				

== Candidates ==
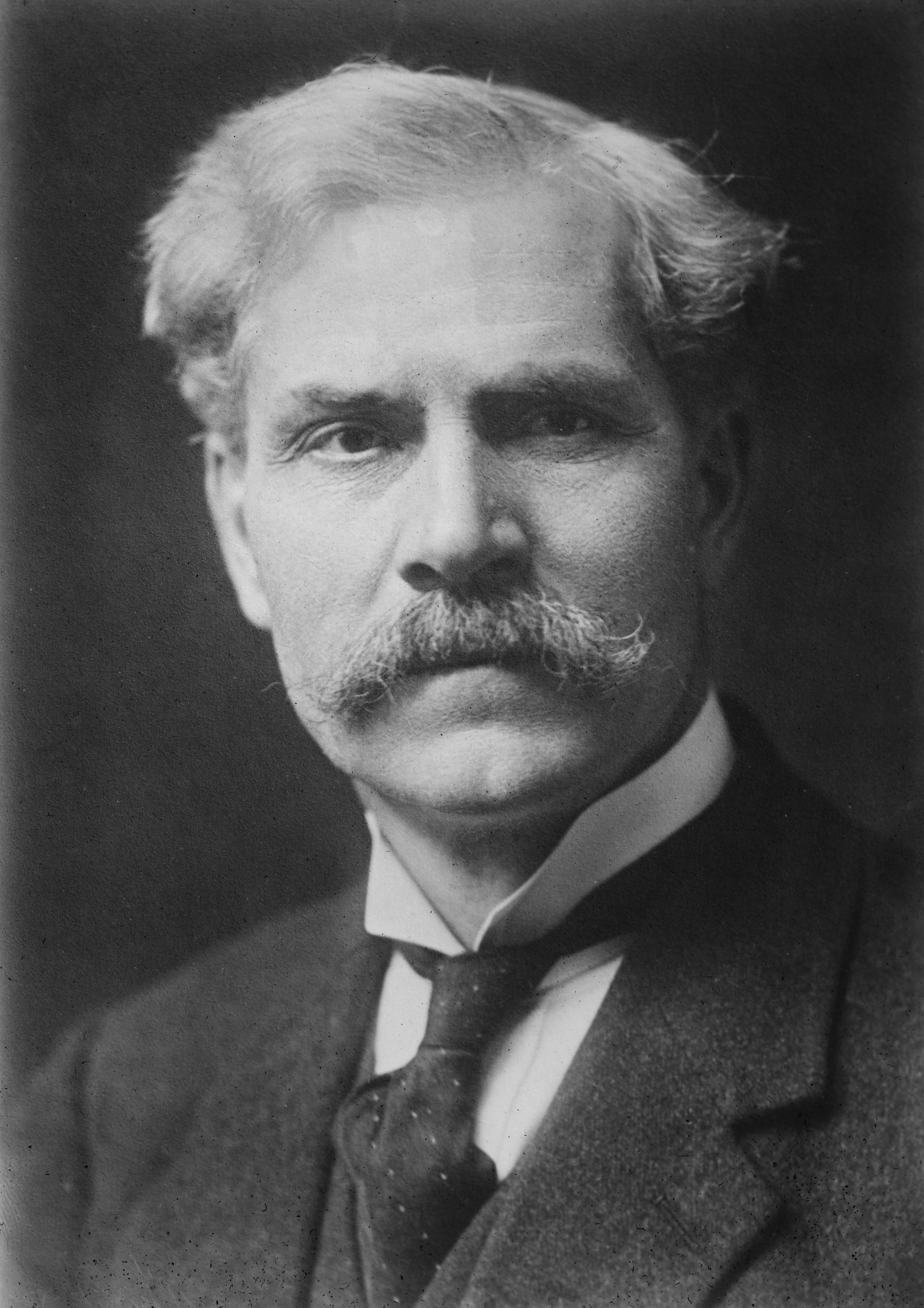
Ramsay MacDonald

- The Labour Party selected as its candidate former leader Ramsay MacDonald, who had lost his Leicester seat at the coupon election of 1918.
- The Conservatives selected Robert Gee, an ex-miner who had stood for the National Democratic Party at Consett in 1918. Gee had been a Captain in The Royal Fusiliers during the First World War, and had gained a Victoria Cross for his actions. This was contrasted with MacDonald, who had been a pacifist opposed to the war, for which he had had to resign the Chairmanship of the Labour Party.

== Campaign ==
The newly formed Communist Party of Great Britain urged voters to abstain, saying ""that while the coalition candidate stands openly and avowedly for capitalism in all its ramifications, its industrial autocracy, its attacks on trade unions, its exploitation, its predatory imperialism, the Labour candidate stands for Capitalism and all its manifestations, none the less surely because its purpose is hidden under high sounding words".

== Result ==
Gee took the seat with a majority of nearly 700 votes.

Woolwich East by-election, 1921
Party		Candidate	Votes	%	±%
C	Unionist	Robert Gee	13,724	51.3	New
	Labour	Ramsay MacDonald	13,041	48.7	N/A
Majority			683	2.6	N/A
Turnout			26,765	78.5	N/A
	Unionist gain from Labour		Swing	N/A	
C indicates candidate endorsed by the coalition government.

== Aftermath ==
Gee held the seat until the 1922 election, when Harry Snell retook the seat for Labour.

1922 general election: Woolwich East
Party	Candidate	Votes	%	±%
Labour	Harry Snell	15,620	57.1	N/A
Conservative	Robert Gee	11,714	42.9	N/A
Majority		3,906	14.2	N/A
Turnout		27,334	80.4	N/A
Labour gain from Conservative		Swing		

MacDonald would go on to be elected MP for Aberavon in 1922, and be re-elected Leader of the Labour Party, then become Prime Minister after the 1923 election.

== Sources ==
Ramsay MacDonald campaigning at Woolwich

== See also ==
- List of United Kingdom by-elections
- Woolwich East constituency
- 1903 Woolwich by-election
- 1931 Woolwich East by-election
- 1951 Woolwich East by-election

== Bibliography ==
- Craig, F. W. S. (1983) [1969]. British parliamentary election results 1918-1949 (3rd ed.). Chichester: Parliamentary Research Services. ISBN 0-900178-06-X.
- Leigh Rayment's Peerage Pages
