= Michael Adams (journalist) =

British journalist (1920–2005)

Michael Evelyn Adams (31 May 1920 – 6 February 2005) was a British journalist who worked for the BBC.

== Life ==
Born in Addis Ababa, Michael Adams was educated at Sedbergh School and studied at Christ Church, Oxford. During the Second World War, he was shot down over the North Sea while serving with the Royal Air Force and was a prisoner of war in Germany for the rest of the conflict. He subsequently became a journalist, and was Middle East correspondent for The Guardian from 1956 to 1962, when he took a year's sabbatical in Italy. He subsequently continued to keep up association with The Guardian as a freelance journalist.

Adams was almost the only British journalist to report on Israel's treatment of Palestinians in 1967.

He helped found the Council for Arab-British Understanding (CAABU) in 1967, and served as its first director. He was editor of Middle East International until 1981. In 1975 he and Christopher Mayhew wrote Publish It Not: The Middle East Cover-Up, a pro-Palestinian work on the Middle East conflict.
