= Middle East International =

British magazine concerning Middle East issues

- Editor-in-chief: Michael Adams (1971–1981), Michael Wall (1981–1995), Steven Sherman (1995–2005)
- Categories: International relations
- Frequency: Bimonthly
- Founder: Christopher Mayhew
- First issue: 1971; 55 years ago
- Final issue: 2005; 21 years ago
- Company: Middle East International Publishers
- Country: United Kingdom
- Language: English
- ISSN: 0047-7249
- OCLC: 781574154

Middle East International was a bimonthly magazine published in London from 1971 until 2005, reaching a total of 761 issues. It was established by Christopher Mayhew and a group of senior British politicians and diplomats. The original publisher was Claud Morris, a newspaper magnate, who withdrew after a boycott by advertisers and an arson attack on his printing works. Mayhew was to remain the director until his death in 1997. It has been described as having been "one of the best-informed journals of current Middle East affairs".

Its aim was to "provide intelligent, authoritative, and independent news and analysis on the Middle East".

== Origins ==
In 1969 the Lebanese Ambassador to London, Nadim Dimechkie, invited recently retired Ambassador to Egypt, Harold Beeley, to a meal with Christopher Mayhew. In the discussion over how to present the Arab point of view in Britain, Mayhew put forward a proposal for the creation of a periodical as well as suggesting a means of gathering financial support. As a first step Beeley used his connections in Geneva to set up an account for the newly created Arab Non-Arab Foundation (ANAF) which was to become the financial backing for Middle East International. Beeley recalled one of the Genevan lawyers he approached as saying “Ici nous avons l’esprit plus ouvert”. ANAF board members included Mayhew, Dennis Walters, Hubert Argod (French Ambassador to Senegal) and Helen von Bothmer. Beeley was to become vice-chairman of Middle East International.

== Format ==
Middle East International's first editor was Tom Little, at the time he was foreign correspondent for the Egyptian newspaper al-Ahram. Until the 1956 Suez Crisis, when he was exposed as a MI6 agent, Little had worked in Cairo as a correspondent for The Times and The Economist. He was also the head of the Arab News Agency (ANA), which was run by the secret Information Research Department (IRD), set up by Mayhew in 1947 when he was a junior Foreign Office Minister.

The first issue of MEI was printed in April 1971. Annual subscription was £3 or $12 internationally. It was 56 pages long and “Its purpose is to repair, as far as possible, the damage done to the region over the years by prejudice and distortion by pursuing the truth about it.” The early editions carried advertisements for businesses and service providers trading in the Middle East, including airlines such as Middle East Airlines and Pan Am; banks such as Arab Bank, Standard Chartered, Gulf Bank of Kuwait and Long-Term Credit Bank of Japan; contractors and engineering firms OXY, Seddon Motors, Consolidated Contractors and TMA Cargo; other advertisers included Port of Milwaukee and Eterna.

After a year Tom Little was succeeded by Michael Adams, a former Guardian foreign correspondent and Director of the Council for Arab-British Understanding. He was followed in 1981 by Michael Wall, who had also been a Guardian correspondent before working for World in Action and then twelve years as Middle East and North Africa correspondent for The Economist . Steven Sherman became editor on Wall's retirement in 1995. Wall's obituary in the Guardian described Middle East International as having a "less naive stance on Israel/Palestine".

Directors of Middle East International's publisher included Sir James Craig, Sir Harold Beeley and Sir Anthony Nutting.

Reporters and commentators who have referred to MEI in their books include David Hirst, David McDowall, David Gilmour, and Noam Chomsky.

The Jewish Chronicle internet archive lists around fifty editions between 1971 and 2005 in which reference is made to Middle East International, describing it as the “authoritative voice of the pro-Arab lobby”.

With its head office in London and another office in Washington, Middle East International was published simultaneously in New York and London. It offered a range of annual subscription rates. Individuals were charged $59/£60 for 25 issues. Academic libraries $79/£60, Institutions/Companies $132/£105, Student/academic $39/£30 (1992 rates).

An index of the years content was published annually until 2001.

== Finance ==
In 1970 Christopher Mayhew approached Sheikh Zayed, the newly installed leader of the United Arab Emirates, with a request for funding. Sheikh Zahed had already given £40,000 to Margaret McKay MP, founder of the Anglo Jordanian Alliance in Parliament, to launch a "pro-Arab" PR campaign. Zahed agreed to donate £50,000 to establish an independent foundation, the ANAF, which would fund the publication of MEI, with a further annual sum for the first seven years.

Middle East International was not a commercial operation. The gap between sales and expenditure was filled by donations. On his appointment as editor in 1981 Michael Wall was told by the board that the publication was on the verge of closing due to its financial situation. In 1995 the publication again came close to closure with only having funds for two or three months publication. The collapse in donations was blamed on the economic consequences of events in Kuwait after the 1990–91 crisis and the new situation in the Occupied Territories following the Oslo agreement. Dennis Walters, chairman of Middle East International, published an appeal for £200,000 to enable publication to continue for a further year during which time it was hoped a long-term solution could be found. The appeal was aimed at "people of wealth and vision" and was seeking donations of £10,000 and above. At the time the journal employed four staff in London and two in Washington. Publication continued for a further ten years.

In his statement announcing the closure of Middle East International, Dennis Walters wrote that one of the reasons for falling circulation was that the internet was providing free news and comment, a problem facing all periodicals. Donations were also falling as "the miserable situation in the Middle East" meant donors had other priorities.

== Abstracting and indexing ==
The journal is abstracted and indexed in the Multidisciplinary databases (Periodicals Index Online). It was available on microfilm through University Microfilms International.

== See also ==
- Washington Report on Middle East Affairs
