= Edge baronets =

Baronetcy in the Baronetage of the United Kingdom

- Escutcheon of the Edge baronets of Ribble Lodge
- Creation date: 1937
- Status: dormant
- Motto: Officio egere nolo, I do not wish to fail in my duty

The Edge Baronetcy, of Ribble Lodge in Lytham St Annes in the County Palatine of Lancaster, is a title in the Baronetage of the United Kingdom. It was created on 9 June 1937, for the Liberal politician Sir William Edge. He represented Bolton and Bosworth in the House of Commons.

== Edge baronets, of Ribble Lodge (1937) ==
- Sir William Edge, 1st Baronet (1880–1948)
- Sir Knowles Edge, 2nd Baronet (1905–1984)
- William Edge, presumed 3rd Baronet (1936–2021)
- Edward Knowles Edge, presumed 4th Baronet, (born 1965)

The presumed third Baronet did not use his title. Also, As of 2007, he had not successfully proved his succession to the baronetcy, and was therefore not on the Official Roll of the Baronetage, with the baronetcy considered dormant.
