= John Minto (disambiguation) =

John Minto (born 1953) is a New Zealand political activist.

John Minto may also refer to:

- John Minto (Oregon pioneer) (1822–1915), American pioneer and politician
- John Minto (British politician) (1887–1965), British politician
- John Minto (rugby league) (born 1972), Australian rugby league player
