= Woolwich West by-election =

Woolwich West by-election may refer to one of two by-elections held for the British House of Commons constituency of Woolwich West:

- 1943 Woolwich West by-election
- 1975 Woolwich West by-election

== See also ==
- Woolwich East by-election (disambiguation)
- Woolwich West (UK Parliament constituency)
