= Christopher Mayhew =

British politician (1915–1997)

The Right Honourable The Lord Mayhew

Member of Parliament for South Norfolk
- In office 5 July 1945 – 3 February 1950
- Preceded by: James Archibald Christie
- Succeeded by: Peter Baker

Member of Parliament for Woolwich East
- In office 14 June 1951 – 20 September 1974
- Preceded by: Ernest Bevin
- Succeeded by: John Cartwright

Personal details
- Born: Christopher Paget Mayhew; 12 June 1915 London, England
- Died: 7 January 1997 (aged 81) London, England
- Party: Liberal Democrats (1988–1997); Liberal (1974–1988); Labour (1945–1974)
- Spouse: Cicely Ludlam (m. 1949)
- Children: 4

Christopher Paget Mayhew, Baron Mayhew (12 June 1915 – 7 January 1997) was a British politician who was a Labour Member of Parliament (MP) from 1945 to 1950 and from 1951 to 1974, when he left the Labour Party to join the Liberals. In 1981, he received a life peerage and was raised to the House of Lords as Baron Mayhew.

Mayhew is most known for his central role in founding the Information Research Department (IRD), a secret wing of the Foreign Office dedicated to Cold War propaganda, and for asking a question in parliament that led to the end of the rum ration in the Royal Navy.

== Early life ==
Christopher Paget Mayhew was born in London, the son of Sir Basil Mayhew of Felthorpe Hall, Norwich. He attended Haileybury and Christ Church, Oxford, as an exhibitioner. In 1934 he holidayed in Moscow. While he was at Oxford, he became President of the Oxford Union. He was commissioned into the Intelligence Corps in 1940, rising to the rank of Major.

== Political career ==
Mayhew was elected to Parliament for the constituency of South Norfolk in the general election of 1945.

In 1945, Mayhew became Under-Secretary of State at the Foreign Office, where he served under Ernest Bevin. According to a long time associate, Claud Morris, Mayhew had "ghost-written some of the most powerful speeches of Ernest Bevin'. He lobbied Bevin and Clement Attlee for a "propaganda counter-offensive" against the Soviet Union. That led in 1948 to the establishment of the Information Research Department (IRD). Mayhew was the first head of the IRD. The department's existence was made public only in 1978, two years after it had closed. Mayhew lost his seat in 1950, but soon returned to Parliament after the death of Bevin, when he won the by-election in 1951 for Bevin's seat of Woolwich East.

During Labour's 13 years in opposition, from 1951 to 1964, Mayhew represented the Labour Party on television, both as a commentator on the BBC and as a presenter on Party Political Broadcasts. He introduced the first Labour broadcast, in 1951, in which he talked with Sir Hartley Shawcross. Mayhew became known as one of the fiercest opponents of unilateral nuclear disarmament in the Labour Party. He also served as Shadow War Secretary from 1960 to 1961 and as a spokesman on foreign affairs from 1961 to 1964.

When Labour took office in 1964, Mayhew was appointed as Minister of Defence for the Royal Navy. However, in 1966, after Harold Wilson's government decided to shift British airpower from carrier-based planes to land-based planes and to cancel the CVA-01 aircraft carrier programme, Mayhew resigned, along with First Sea Lord Sir David Luce.

On 17 December 1969, the Admiralty Board issued a written answer to a question from Mayhew: "The Admiralty Board concludes that the rum issue is no longer compatible with the high standards of efficiency required now that the individual's tasks in ships are concerned with complex, and often delicate, machinery and systems on the correct functioning of which people's lives may depend". This led to a debate in the House of Commons on the evening of 28 January 1970, now referred to as the "Great Rum Debate", started by James Wellbeloved, MP for Erith and Crayford, who believed that the ration should not be removed. The debate lasted an hour and 15 minutes and closed at 10:29 p.m., with a decision that the rum ration was no longer appropriate.

In 1970, Admiral Peter Hill-Norton abolished the rum ration as he felt it could have led to sailors being less capable to manage complex machinery. The last rum ration was on 31 July 1970 and became known as "Black Tot Day", as sailors were unhappy about the loss of the rum ration.

=== Opposition to Israel ===
Mayhew was a consistent advocate of Palestinian rights. In 1971, with fellow MP Dennis Walters and publisher Claud Morris, he launched a bi-monthly journal, Middle East International (MEI). Mayhew had been promised £50,000 from the Sheikh Zayed of the UAE to publish the new magazine. The money was to be channeled through a foundation set up in Geneva by former Ambassador Harold Beeley calling itself the Arab Non-Arab Foundation (ANAF). Mayhew remained Chairman of MEI until his death in 1997. MEI continued to be published for a further eight years. Over its thirty-four years MEI had a number of retired British diplomats serving as directors, including James Craig and Anthony Nutting. It was described by The Jewish Chronicle as the "authoritative voice of the pro-Arab lobby".

In 1973, Mayhew offered £5,000 to anyone who could produce evidence that Gamal Ahmed Nasser had stated that he sought to "drive the Jews into the sea". Mayhew repeated the offer later in the House of Commons (Hansard, 18 October 1973) and broadened it to include any genocidal statement by any responsible Arab leader (The Guardian, 9 September 1974) while reserving for himself the right to be the arbiter of the authenticity of any purported statements as well as their meaning. Mayhew received several letters from claimants, each one producing one quotation or another from an Arab leader, all of which Mayhew assessed as fabricated.

One claimant, Warren Bergson, a 22-year old student from Salford, took Mayhew to court. The case came before the High Court in February 1976. Bergson was unable to offer evidence of Nasser's alleged statement and acknowledged that after thorough research, he had been unable to find any statement by a responsible Arab leader that could be described as genocidal. Bergson's lawyer admitted that the full text of a statement on which his client had relied made it clear that "the statement was not genocidal". Bergson offered an apology to Mayhew.

=== Move to Liberal Party ===
Mayhew had been feeling increasingly uneasy with Labour policies under Harold Wilson and in 1974 he moved to the Liberals, being the first Member of Parliament to cross the floor to the Liberals in several decades. In the general election in October 1974, Mayhew contested Bath instead of Woolwich East in order not to split his former constituency party. He was defeated in Bath, which he also unsuccessfully contested in 1979.

In the 1981 Birthday Honours Mayhew was named a life peer and the Letters Patent were issued on 6 July 1981 giving his style and title Baron Mayhew, of Wimbledon in Greater London, and became the Liberals' spokesman on defence in the House of Lords.

== Other activities ==
Mayhew was also active as an advocate for the mentally ill and served as Chairman of MIND (National Association for Mental Health) from 1992 to 1997.

He wrote several books, including Publish It Not: The Middle East Cover-Up (co-written with Michael Adams, 1975) and his autobiography, Time To Explain (1987).

== Panorama experiment ==
In 1955 Mayhew took part in an experiment that was intended to form a Panorama special for BBC TV but was never broadcast. Under the guidance of his friend Humphry Osmond, Mayhew ingested 400 mg of mescaline hydrochloride and allowed himself to be filmed for the duration of the trip. Samples of the audio were used in the psychedelic dance tracks "Mayhew Speaks Out" and "Christopher Mayhew Says" by the band the Shamen. Part of the footage was included in the BBC documentary LSD – The Beyond Within (1986).

== Personal life ==
In 1949, he married Cicely Ludlam, whom he met when she was one of few women in the diplomatic service, and they had two sons and two daughters.

Mayhew died in London on 7 January 1997, at the age of 81.

== Publications ==
- Dear Viewer (1953)
- Man Seeking God (1955)
- Commercial Television – What is to be done? (1959)
- Coexistence plus. A positive approach to world peace (1962)
- Britain's role tomorrow (1967)
- Publish it not. The Middle East cover up (1975)
- The Disillusioned Voter's Guide to Electoral Reform (1976)
- Time to Explain: An Autobiography (1997)
- A War of Words: A Cold War Witness (1998)

Parliament of the United Kingdom
Preceded by James Christie	Member of Parliament for South Norfolk; 1945–1950	Succeeded by Peter Baker
Preceded by Ernest Bevin	Member of Parliament for Woolwich East; 1951 – October 1974	Succeeded by John Cartwright
