= James Ellis (British politician) =

British Liberal Party politician

The Honourable James Ellis

Member of Parliament for Bosworth
- In office 24 November 1885 – 4 July 1892
- Preceded by: Constituency created
- Succeeded by: Charles McLaren

Personal details
- Born: 2 October 1829 Glenfield, Leicestershire, United Kingdom
- Died: 1901 (aged 71–72)
- Citizenship: British
- Party: Liberal Party
- Spouse: Louisa Burgess
- Occupation: Merchant

James Ellis (2 October 1829 – 1901) was a British Liberal Party politician who sat in the House of Commons from 1885 to 1892.

== Early life ==
Ellis was born in Glenfield, Leicestershire, the son of Joseph Ellis and his wife Hannah Shipley, daughter of John Shipley. He was educated at the schools of the Society of Friends (Quakers). He was a merchant and owner of granite quarries. He was chairman of Leicester School Board.

== Political career ==
By 1881 Ellis had been elected as Chairman of South Leicestershire Liberal Association He was Liberal candidate for Bosworth at the 1885 general election and was returned as Member of Parliament. On 25 June 1888 he announced he would be standing down at the next election at a meeting of the Bosworth Divisional Liberal Association in Hinckley Ellis was described as a Gladstonian Liberal by inclination. He continued held the seat until the 1892 election.

== Family ==
Ellis married in 1855 Louisa Burgess daughter of Thomas Burgess of Wigston Grange, Leicestershire.

Parliament of the United Kingdom
| New constituency | Member of Parliament for Bosworth; 1885 – 1892 | Succeeded by Charles McLaren |
