= Harrington Hulton =

English cricketer

Harrington Arthur Harrop Hulton (9 November 1846 – 28 January 1923) was an English cricketer active in 1868 who played for Lancashire County Cricket Club.

He was born in Ashton-under-Lyne and died in Cheltenham.

He appeared in two first-class matches, scoring 13 runs with a highest score of 6.

He was the Conservative candidate for Bosworth in 1886 and 1892, losing to the Liberal candidate in both cases.

General election 1892: Bosworth
Party	Candidate	Votes	%	±%
Liberal	Charles McLaren	5,370	58.3	+0.4
Conservative	Harrington Hulton	3,846	41.7	−0.4
Majority		1,524	16.6	+0.8
Turnout		9,216	87.1	+4.7
Registered electors		10,586		
Liberal hold		Swing	+0.4	
