= George Hicks (trade unionist) =

British trade unionist and politician

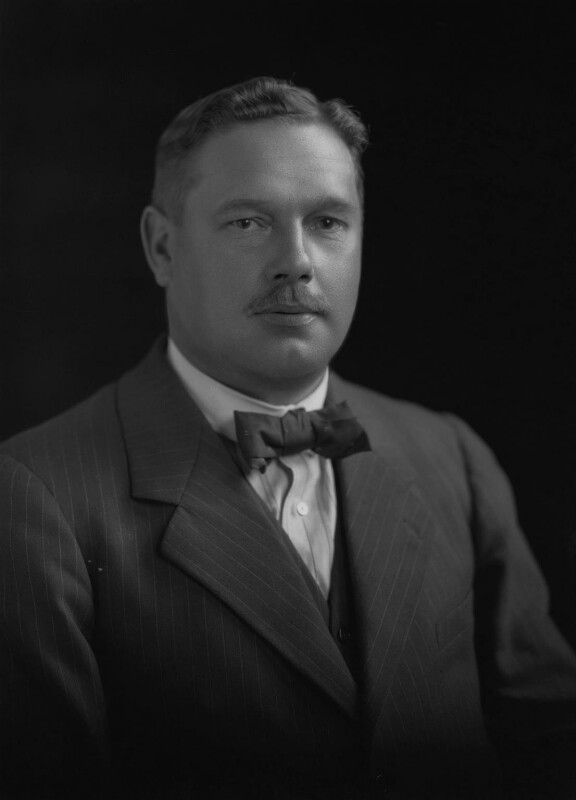
- George Hicks in 1927 by Lafayette

Member of Parliament for Woolwich East
- In office 15 April 1931 – 3 February 1950
- Preceded by: Henry Snell
- Succeeded by: Ernest Bevin

Personal details
- Born: 13 May 1879 Vernhams Dean, Hampshire, England
- Died: 19 July 1954 (aged 75)

Ernest George Hicks (13 May 1879 – 19 July 1954) was a British trades unionist and Labour Party politician.

Hicks was born in 1879 in Vernhams Dean, Hampshire. Along with fellow bricklayers Jack Fitzgerald and F. K. Cadman, he was one of the founding members of the Socialist Party of Great Britain in June 1904. Hicks resigned on 20 August 1904, rejoining on 14 December 1908 and finally leaving around 1910. He does not seem to have played an active part in the life of the Party, but after leaving it went on to be a prominent trade union leader in the bricklayers' union.

Hicks first came to prominence during the great labour unrest just before the First World War, particularly in the London building trades lockout of 1914. He was a well-known syndicalist agitator at this time, being linked with Tom Mann’s Industrial Syndicalist Education League and its effective successor the Industrial Democracy League.

In 1912, he became National Organiser of the Operative Bricklayers' Society, serving as its General Secretary from 1919 to 1921. Subsequently he was General Secretary of Amalgamated Union of Building Trade Workers (the successor to the OBS) from 1921 to 1941. Hicks was a member of General Council of the TUC from 1921 to 1941, during the early to mid-1920s gaining a reputation as a Left (e.g., writing for the Communist-controlled Sunday Worker, and helping organise the 1926 General Strike). This had been largely lost by the time he served as the TUC President in 1927–28. Around this time he was also a member of the General Council of the International Federation of Trade Unions.

Hicks wrote the foreword for the 1927 edition of The Ragged Trousered Philanthropists. He was present at the 1931 Jubilee meeting of the Labour-affiliated SDF at Bristol where he made the main speech (later published as a pamphlet Poverty from Plenty).

In a 1931 by-election, Hicks was elected Labour Member of Parliament (MP) for Woolwich East, representing that constituency until 1950. He was Parliamentary Secretary to the Minister of Works in the wartime coalition government from 1941 to 1945; a fellow ex-member of the SPGB, Valentine McEntee, was his parliamentary private secretary. He died in 1954, aged 75.

Parliament of the United Kingdom
Preceded by Harry Snell	Member of Parliament for Woolwich East; 1931–1950	Succeeded by Ernest Bevin
Trade union offices
Preceded by John Batchelor	General Secretary of the Operative Bricklayers' Society; 1919–1921	Succeeded by Position abolished
Preceded by New position	General Secretary of the Amalgamated Union of Building Trade Workers; 1921–1941	Succeeded by Luke Fawcett
Preceded by A. A. Purcell and Ben Smith	Trades Union Congress representative to the American Federation of Labour; 1926; With: John Bromley	Succeeded by Arthur Pugh and Will Sherwood
Preceded by Arthur Pugh	President of the Trades Union Congress; 1927	Succeeded by Ben Turner
Preceded by Andrew Conley	Chairman of the Trades Councils' Joint Consultative Committee; 1934 – 1937	Succeeded by Charles Dukes
