= David Tredinnick (politician) =

British Conservative politician

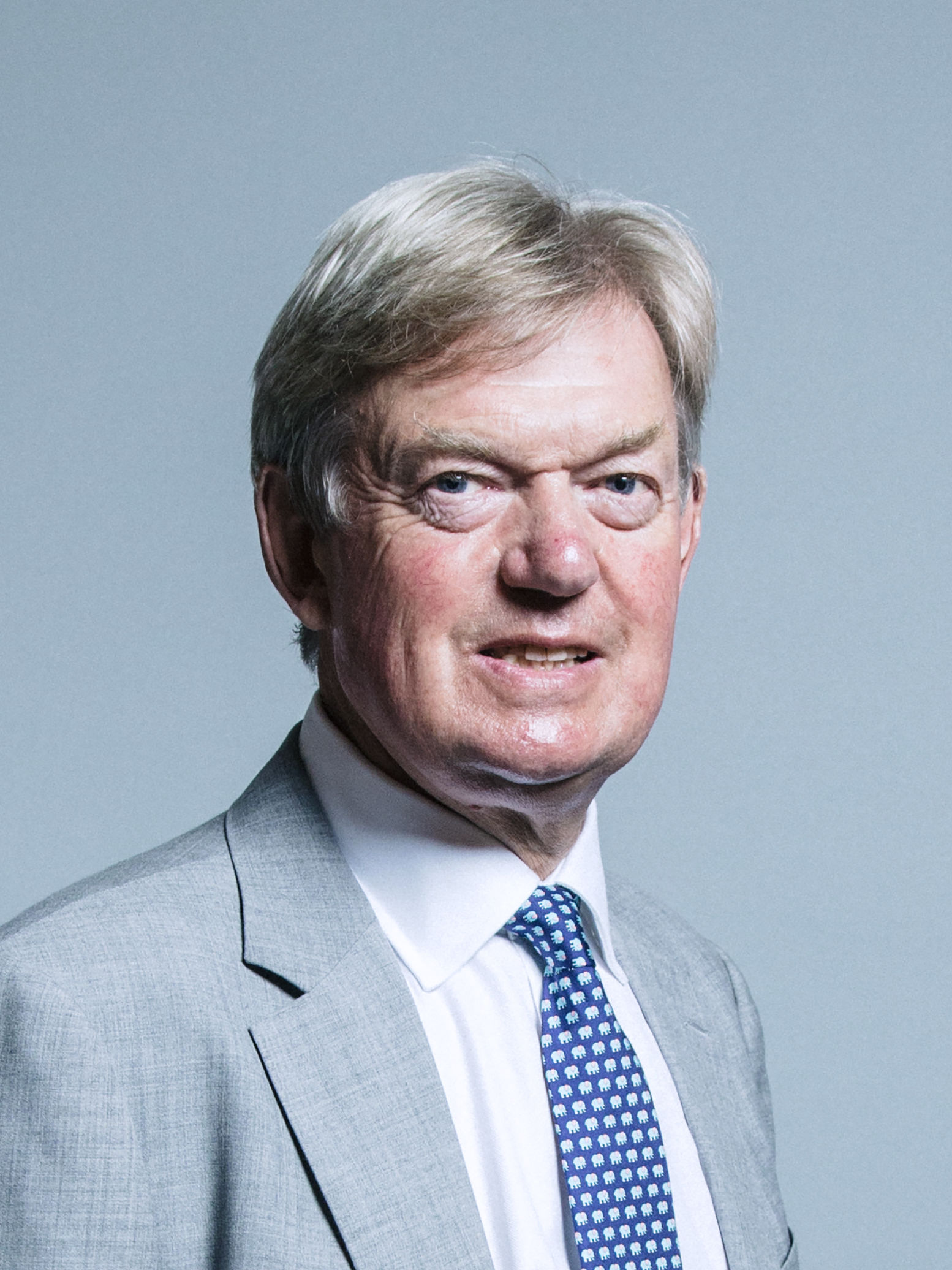

Member of Parliament for Bosworth
- In office 11 June 1987 – 6 November 2019
- Preceded by: Adam Butler
- Succeeded by: Luke Evans

Personal details
- Born: 19 January 1950 (age 76) Worthing, West Sussex, England
- Party: Conservative
- Spouse: Rebecca Shott (m. 1983; div. 2008)
- Children: 2
- Education: Eton College; Mons Officer Cadet School
- Alma mater: St John's College, Oxford; University of Cape Town
- Website: bosworthconservatives.org.uk
- Military career
- Allegiance: United Kingdom
- Branch: British Army
- Service years: 1968–1971
- Rank: Second lieutenant
- Service number: 486139
- Unit: Grenadier Guards

David Arthur Stephen Tredinnick (born 19 January 1950) is a British Conservative former Member of Parliament who represented Bosworth in Leicestershire from 1987 to 2019.

He is an advocate of alternative medicine, and was chairman of the All-Party Parliamentary Group for Integrated Healthcare (previously Integrated and Complementary Healthcare) from 2002 to 2019.

== Early life ==
Tredinnick attended Eton College, St John's College, Oxford (gaining a MLitt), and the Graduate School of Business at the University of Cape Town, where he gained an MBA.

Tredinnick was commissioned into the Grenadier Guards after passing out from Mons Officer Cadet School on 10 August 1968. He served mainly in Northern Ireland and West Germany. Tredinnick was transferred to the Regular Reserve on 14 March 1971 before resigning his commission on 10 August 1976.

From 1972 to 1973, he was a trainee at EB Savory Milln & Co stockbrokers, then in 1974 he was an account executive at Quadrant Int. In 1976, he was a salesman at Kalle Infotech UK, and sales manager at Word Right Word Processing from 1977 to 1978. From 1978 to 1979, he was a consultant at Baird Communications NV, and marketing manager at QI Europe Ltd from 1979 to 1981. He was manager at Malden Mitcham Properties from 1981 to 1987. As of 2015, he remains a director.

== Parliamentary career ==
Tredinnick contested the seat of Cardiff South and Penarth in 1983, coming second (with a 35.9% vote share) to James Callaghan, cutting the former Prime Minister's majority from 8,700 to 2,300 votes. He won Bosworth in Leicestershire in 1987. He became a Parliamentary Private Secretary, but was forced to resign in July 1994 after it emerged that he had abused parliamentary privilege by agreeing to accept payment of £1,000 from an undercover reporter to ask questions in Parliament about a non-existent drug. Part of the cash-for-questions affair, the MP was caught in an investigation by The Sunday Times. In April 1995, he was suspended without salary from entering the House of Commons chamber for 20 sitting days.

Tredinnick was the chair of the Joint Committee on Statutory Instruments from 1997 to 2005, which also made him a member of the Liaison Committee, and he became a member of the Health Select Committee in 2010. In January 2013 he was co-opted into the Science and Technology Select Committee after Caroline Dinenage stepped down and there were no other nominations from the Conservative party.

In February 2019 he announced that he would stand down from parliament at the next election.

Tredinnick supported Boris Johnson in the 2019 Conservative leadership election.

=== Support for alternative medicine ===
Tredinnick supports alternative medicine including homeopathy and chiropractic. In October 2009, he told Parliament that blood does not clot under a full moon; a spokesperson for the Royal College of Surgeons of England warned that his colleagues would "laugh their heads off" at the suggestion. In the same debate, Tredinnick characterised scientists as "racially prejudiced".

Health journalist Victoria Lambert has interpreted Health Minister Jeremy Hunt's call for traditional Chinese medicine to be available on the NHS as an endorsement of Tredinnick's call for integrated alternative healthcare. Tredinnick claims that "herbal medicine is not quackery", is cost-effective and, unlike mainstream medicine, has been used for thousands of years in China.

In July 2013, Tredinnick sponsored an Early Day Motion congratulating a farmer for his decision to use homeopathy. The motion was supported by one other MP; however, the British veterinary association said there is no evidence of any benefit of the treatment. Tredinnick supported further Early Day Motions on yoga and Ayurveda on International Yoga Day 2017 in favour of "well-being initiatives for NHS staff and for yoga to be integrated within treatment for NHS patients" and another on the Government of India's 3rd Ayurveda Day in 2018 "urges the integration of Ayurveda into the NHS ... and calls on the Government to introduce an Ayurveda Chair in all medical schools so that ... medical students gain a thorough grounding in this ancient science of healthcare." Neither of these motions succeeded.

Although Sally Davies, the Chief Medical Officer (CMO), had described homeopathy as "rubbish", it was reported in May 2014 that health secretary Jeremy Hunt, at Tredinnick's urging, had requested a review of three studies by the French company, Boiron. These were found not to demonstrate the effectiveness of homeopathy, and the quality of the research in them was later questioned by Edzard Ernst. Tredinnick told The Independent in June 2015 that homeopathy's common rejection was the result of "vested interests trying to protect their own turf".

In October 2019 Tredinnick again advocated alternative medicine in the House of Commons. He recommended that Ayurveda, yoga, naturopathy, homeopathy, osteopathy and chiropractic be considered in "a new health paradigm" for the NHS. Tredinnick made reference to the Indian Ministry of Ayurveda, Yoga & Naturopathy, Unani, Siddha, Sowa Rigpa and Homoeopathy established by Hindu nationalist Prime Minister of India Narendra Modi in 2014, India's "sustainable health ministry" and its "4,000-year-old medical system plus the world’s greatest usage of homeopathy", and China's "traditional 4,000-year-old herbal medicine system and acupuncture", claiming that "one third of the world’s population already has sustainable healthcare". He had previously raised AYSUH in a question to Boris Johnson in July 2019 and in a written question to the Secretary of State for Health and Social Care in June 2018, to which the latter, Steve Brine replied his department had "no plans" to "hold discussions with the Ministry of AYUSH".

==== Astrology in medicine ====
Tredinnick is a supporter of astrology and its use in medical practice.

In November 2009, he spoke at a meeting organised by the Astrological Association of Great Britain, where he related his personal experience of astrology and illness, advocating that astrology be integrated into the National Health Service (NHS). In 2014 he told MPs: "I am absolutely convinced that those who look at the map of the sky for the day that they were born and receive some professional guidance will find out a lot about themselves and it will make their lives easier". "I do believe that astrology and complementary medicine would help take the huge pressure off doctors", he told Astrological Journal in February 2015. "People such as Professor Brian Cox, who called astrology 'rubbish' have simply not studied the subject. The BBC is quite dismissive of astrology and seeks to promote the science perspective and seems always keen to broadcast criticisms of astrology". Liberal Democrat Michael Mullaney, who stood against him at the 2015 general election, was concerned about his "utterly ridiculous obsession with astrology" asking: "Will Mr Tredinnick ever stop?"

==== Criticism ====
Tredinnick's views have attracted criticism. During the 2010 United Kingdom general election, he was opposed by New Scientist journalist Michael Brooks who objected to "Tredinnick's outspoken promotion of alternative medicine." During a hustings debate called by Brooks to "highlight the scientific literacy of the UK's elected representatives", Brooks said that Tredinnick regarded homeopathy as a suitable treatment for malaria and HIV, which Tredinnick did not deny. In March 2013, Tredinnick's opinions were described as "nonsensical" by the government's outgoing chief scientist, Sir John Beddington, who said the MP had fallen for the "Galileo fallacy" ("Galileo was laughed at but was right; therefore since I am laughed at I must be right").

Tredinnick's appointment to the Health Committee in June 2010 was criticised in two science reports in The Guardian. Martin Robbins said the appointment was "an extremely disturbing development", even though "Tredinnick is a figure unlikely to be taken seriously by policymakers". Nature's Adam Rutherford described Tredinnick as "misinformed about a great many things" and said that "giving [him] influence on medical policy...is a bad move." The Daily Telegraph's writer Ian Douglas described the appointment as "a problem".

Tredinnick's appointment to the Science and Technology Committee also drew criticism. Andy McSmith in The Independent cited Tredinnick's view that homeopathy could cure HIV, tuberculosis, malaria, urinary infections, diarrhoea, skin eruptions, diabetes, epilepsy, eye infections, intestinal parasites, cancer, and gangrene among other conditions, and quoted Imran Khan, former head of the Campaign for Science and Engineering, as saying that "someone with such incredibly odd views is not helpful." Tom Whipple in The Times said his appointment caused despair, whilst Elizabeth Gibney in the Times Higher Education quoted the Skeptical Voter website as saying that Tredinnick is "perhaps the worst example of scientific illiteracy in government." Lord Winston described his beliefs in homeopathy and astrology as "lunatic".

=== Freedom of Information and expenses ===
In May 2007, Tredinnick was among 98 MPs who voted to exempt themselves from the Freedom of Information Act, ending the compulsory legal requirement for MPs to disclose their expenses. The move was later overturned by the House of Lords.

In 2006, Tredinnick claimed for astrology software and tuition, saying it was for a debate on alternative medicine, and had been cleared with the Commons fees office. In 2009, he claimed £125 for a course on "intimate relationships" on his Parliamentary office costs allowance, but this was rejected. The Daily Telegraph also noted he was claiming up to £7000 a quarter for a mortgage on a £2m house near Parliament. In early 2010, during the United Kingdom parliamentary expenses scandal, it emerged that Tredinnick had chosen to return £755.33 as he had decided that his expenditure on astrology software was supplementary to his parliamentary duties, although the parliamentary commissioner for standards John Lyon had decided against requesting that he should do so.

=== Brexit ===
Tredinnick was opposed to Brexit prior to the 2016 referendum.

== Personal life ==
Tredinnick was married to Rebecca Jane Shott from 1983 until 2008 with whom he has a daughter and a son. He lives in Sussex.

Parliament of the United Kingdom
Preceded by Adam Courtauld Butler	Member of Parliament for Bosworth; 1987–2019	Succeeded by Luke Evans
