= Arthur Allen (Labour politician) =

British politician (1887-1981)

The Honourable Arthur Allen

Member of Parliament for Bosworth
- In office 5 July 1945 – 18 September 1959
- Preceded by: Sir William Edge
- Succeeded by: Woodrow Wyatt

Personal details
- Born: 10 January 1887 Wellingborough, Northamptonshire
- Died: 8 October 1981 (aged 94) Kettering
- Citizenship: British
- Party: Labour
- Spouse: Polly Mary Bradshaw (m. 1914)
- Children: 2
- Education: Ruskin College, Oxford
- Occupation: Footwear manufacturer, trade unionist

Arthur Cecil Allen (10 January 1887 – 8 October 1981) was a British footwear manufacturer, trade union officer and Member of Parliament. He served as an Opposition Whip, but his most important position was as Parliamentary Private Secretary to Hugh Gaitskell during the first few years as Leader of the Opposition.

== Origins ==
Allen was born in Wellingborough, Northamptonshire, and lived in the town of Higham Ferrers. He attended only an elementary school before going into the local footwear industry. In 1952 he said he had begun in the boot and shoe industry at the age of 13, working 54½ hours a week, earning half a crown a week.

In 1914 Allen married Polly Mary Bradshaw; they had a son and a daughter. He served in the Army throughout the First World War, being part of the expeditionary force sent to Salonica in 1915 and later serving in France.

== Trade unionism ==
Returning to Northamptonshire, Allen resumed his previous occupation and became active in the National Union of Boot and Shoe Operatives which he had joined in 1908. Under the sponsorship of the union he obtained a Trades Union Congress sponsorship to study at Ruskin College, Oxford, where he obtained a diploma in economics and political science. He was elected to the Union's Executive in 1933, and was also active in local politics for the Labour Party as chairman of Irthlingborough Urban District Council and a member of Northamptonshire County Council. In 1937 Allen was elected a County Alderman of Northamptonshire.

== Election to Parliament ==
Allen was adopted in April 1945 as the Labour Party candidate for the Bosworth division, which was held by the Liberal Nationals with a 7,000 majority although the sitting member did not seek re-election. In the ensuing general election, he won the seat with a majority of 5,297 in line with national trends.

== Foreign tours ==
He was happier being active behind the scenes in Parliament than he was taking a front rank position, and was a member of several important delegations to foreign countries. In 1946 he visited occupied Germany and made his maiden speech when he reported back to the House of Commons that the British administration was working well but that more coal and food were needed otherwise the German population would grow unwilling to cooperate. He was part of an unofficial mission of eight Labour MPs who visited Czechoslovakia, Poland, Yugoslavia, and the Soviet Union in 1947. In Russia he was able to have an interview with Joseph Stalin.

== Economic policy ==
In matters of economics, Allen strongly supported the unity of the Labour Party with the Trade Unions, speaking in 1948 of how it was essential for full employment; he also called for restraint "for the nation's sake" on the part of some politicians and journalists. However, he spoke at the annual conference of his union in May 1947 in opposition to a motion calling for Conservatives to be expelled in the same way as Communists, arguing that "it was just as well to be fair" and that Conservatives did not ban other parties from operating as Communists did.

== Relationship to Cripps ==
Allen was seriously injured in a car accident at Irthlingborough on 7 January 1948 and had to have an operation. He had recovered in time for the 1950 general election in which his Conservative opponent Major Anthony Cripps was the nephew of Labour Chancellor of the Exchequer Sir Stafford Cripps; Allen retained his seat with an improved majority after the intervention of a Liberal candidate. In the new Parliament, Sir Stafford Cripps appointed Allen to be his Parliamentary Private Secretary.

In June 1950, Allen helped to defend Cripps against a Conservative motion which called for the United Kingdom to participate in negotiations on the "Schuman Plan" to organise European coal and steel production. He sponsored an amendment which refused to enter undefined commitments and stressed the importance of the Commonwealth. After Cripps' sudden resignation, his successor as Chancellor Hugh Gaitskell kept Allen on as his Parliamentary Private Secretary; Allen had also worked for Gaitskell in Gaitskell's previous position as Minister of State for Economic Affairs.

== Opposition Whip ==
Allen was again re-elected in the 1951 general election, with a majority of 7,645 in a straight fight with the Conservative Party candidate. He was appointed an Opposition Whip in the new session. His new role restricted his ability to speak in the House of Commons, but Allen kept up his activity. He was appointed as a substitute member of the United Kingdom delegation to the Consultative Assembly of the Council of Europe in 1952.

== Relationship with Gaitskell ==
When Hugh Gaitskell was elected as Leader of the Labour Party, he took Allen out of the Opposition Whips' office to serve as his Parliamentary Private Secretary once again. Allen, who was a party loyalist who never broke the Labour Party whip, maintained relationships between Gaitskell and Labour Party backbenchers. A speech by Allen was a rarity, and when speaking from the benefit of experience in February 1958 in favour of a statutory wages policy in order not to let too much money loose in the economy, it was the first speech he had made for six years. Allen believed that stable money was needed in order to get full employment. In 1958 he was a member of a Private Bill Committee on two Bills dealing with private Water companies which sat for the longest time in sixty years.

== Retirement ==
In March 1959 Allen announced that he would not seek re-election. His successor was Woodrow Wyatt, adopted unanimously on 31 May. He died in Kettering aged 94.

Parliament of the United Kingdom
Preceded by Sir William Edge	Member of Parliament for Bosworth; 1945 – 1959	Succeeded by Woodrow Wyatt
