= Adam Butler (politician) =

British politician (1931–2008)

The Right Honourable Sir Adam Butler DL

Minister for Defence Procurement
- In office 11 September 1984 – 2 September 1985
- Prime Minister: Margaret Thatcher
- Preceded by: Geoffrey Pattie
- Succeeded by: Norman Lamont

Minister of State for Northern Ireland
- In office 5 January 1981 – 11 September 1984
- Prime Minister: Margaret Thatcher
- Preceded by: Hugh Rossi
- Succeeded by: Lord Gowrie

Minister of State for Industry
- In office 6 May 1979 – 5 January 1981
- Prime Minister: Margaret Thatcher
- Preceded by: Alan Williams
- Succeeded by: Norman Tebbit

Member of Parliament for Bosworth
- In office 18 June 1970 – 18 May 1987
- Preceded by: Woodrow Wyatt
- Succeeded by: David Tredinnick

Personal details
- Born: 11 October 1931 Halstead, Essex, England, UK
- Died: 9 January 2008 (aged 76) Lighthorne, Warwickshire, England, UK
- Citizenship: British
- Party: Conservative
- Spouse: Felicity Molesworth-St Aubyn
- Parent: Rab Butler (father)
- Relatives: Montagu Butler (grandfather); Samuel Courtauld (grandfather)
- Education: Maidwell Hall; Eton College
- Alma mater: Pembroke College, Cambridge
- Occupation: Soldier, businessman

Sir Adam Courtauld Butler PC, DL (11 October 1931 – 9 January 2008) was a British Conservative Party politician, serving as an MP for 17 years and holding several junior ministerial offices.

== Background ==
Butler was born in Halstead, the second of four children of Rab Butler and his wife, Sydney, only child of Samuel Courtauld. He was educated at Maidwell Hall prep school in Northamptonshire and Eton College. After national service from 1949 to 1951 as a second lieutenant in the King's Royal Rifle Corps, he studied history and economics at Pembroke College, Cambridge from 1951 to 1954 (of which his grandfather, Sir Montagu Butler, had been Master).

== Career ==
After graduating, he joined the Canadian Army for as a captain to serve as aide-de-camp to the Governor General of Canada, Vincent Massey, for one year. His mother died of cancer in 1954, while he was in Canada. He returned to England in 1955, and he joined the family company, Courtaulds, working as a director of various subsidiaries.

Butler became Member of Parliament for Bosworth in 1970, surprisingly defeating the sitting Labour Party MP, Woodrow Wyatt. He was first Conservative MP to represent the seat since the 1920s, and barely retained his seat at the two general elections in 1974. He served as Parliamentary private secretary to Joseph Godber, who was Minister of State in the Foreign Office and then at the Ministry of Agriculture, Fisheries and Food. He became a whip in 1974. After Margaret Thatcher became Conservative leader in 1975, Butler became one of her two Parliamentary Private Secretaries, along with John Stanley. Following the Conservative victory at the 1979 general election, he served as Minister of State for Industry at the Department of Industry until 1981, and then as minister for economic development in Northern Ireland until 1984, where he called in the receivers at the De Lorean motorcar company, and finally as minister for defense procurement until 1985. He was sworn of the Privy Council in 1984, and knighted in 1986.

He was also a member of the Court of the Goldsmiths' Company and later chairman of the British Hallmarking Council from 1998 to 2004; chairman of the Samuel Courtauld Trustees, associated with the Courtauld Institute of Art, from 1989 to 2005; and chairman of the Airey Neave Trust from 1990 to 2000.

== Personal life and family ==
He lived at his 200-acre (0.81 km^{2}) farm at Lighthorne in Warwickshire. He became a Deputy Lieutenant of Warwickshire in 1993, and served as Vice Lord Lieutenant of Warwickshire from 1998 to 2005. He enjoyed field sports, and was chairman of the Warwickshire Hunt for 23 years. He also was member of the Countryside Animal Welfare Group, and campaigned to end the RSPCA's support for a hunting ban as a member of its council.

He married Felicity Molesworth-St Aubyn in 1955. He died in Lighthorne, Warwickshire, survived by his wife and their two sons and daughter. Lady Butler died in 2022.

== Arms ==
Coat of arms of Adam Butler

Notes
Son of Rab Butler. Arms displayed at Goldsmiths' Hall.
Crest
A falcon rising belled and jessed the dexter leg resting on a covered cup all Or.
Escutcheon
Gules on a chevron cottised between three covered cups all Or a cross couped Azure. A crescent for difference.
Motto
Audentior

== Sources ==
- The Times Guide to the House of Commons, Times Newspapers Ltd, 1983
- Leigh Rayment's Historical List of MPs
- Obituary The Times.
- Obituary, The Guardian.
- Obituary, The Independent.

Parliament of the United Kingdom
Preceded by Woodrow Wyatt	Member of Parliament for Bosworth; 1970–1987	Succeeded by David Tredinnick
