= Robert Gee =

Recipient of the Victoria Cross (1876–1960)

Robert Gee VC, MC, MP
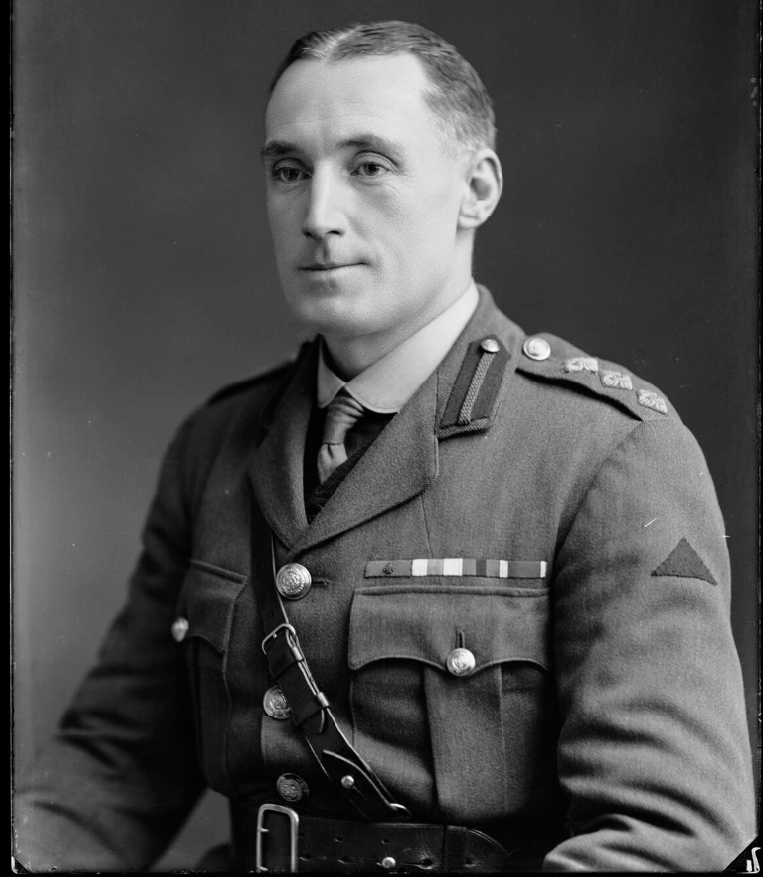
- Born: 7 May 1876; Leicester, Leicestershire, England
- Died: 2 August 1960 (aged 84); Perth, Western Australia
- Military career
- Allegiance: United Kingdom
- Branch: British Army
- Service years: 1893–1918
- Rank: Captain
- Units: Royal Fusiliers; Queen's Own Royal West Kent Regiment
- Conflicts: World War I
- Awards: Victoria Cross; Military Cross
- Other work: Member of Parliament

Captain Robert Gee VC MC (7 May 1876 – 2 August 1960) was an English-Jewish recipient of the Victoria Cross and a Conservative Member of Parliament.

== Biography ==
Born in Leicester, Gee was orphaned when aged nine. He was sent to the workhouse in Leicester, then to the Countesthorpe Cottage Homes for orphaned children. He enlisted in the Army in 1893. Quartermaster-Serjeant Robert Gee was commissioned as a second lieutenant on 21 May 1915.

He was awarded the Military Cross in for his actions on the first day on the Somme (1 July 1916); "For conspicuous gallantry in action. He encouraged his men during the attack by fearlessly exposing himself and cheering them on. When wounded he refused to retire, and urged his men on till, after being blown into the air by a shell, he was carried in half unconscious."

Battle of Cambrai (1917); the German counter attack

He was 41 years old, and a temporary captain in the 2nd Battalion, The Royal Fusiliers, British Army during the First World War when he was awarded the Victoria Cross, the highest and most prestigious award for gallantry in the face of the enemy that can be awarded to British and Commonwealth forces, for his actions on 30 November 1917 at Masnières and Les Rues Vertes, France, during a German counter attack in the Battle of Cambrai (1917):

An attack by the enemy captured brigade headquarters and ammunition dump. Captain Gee, finding himself a prisoner, managed to escape and organised a party of the brigade staff with which he attacked the enemy, closely followed by two companies of infantry. He cleared the locality and established a defensive flank, then finding an enemy machine-gun still in action, with a revolver in each hand he went forward and captured the gun, killing eight of the crew. He was wounded, but would not have his wound dressed until the defence was organised.

He later transferred to the Royal West Kent Regiment.

== Post war ==
After the war, Gee went into politics. He first stood for Parliament as a National Democratic Party candidate in the 1918 General Election at Consett, where he finished second.

He then stood for Parliament as a Conservative in the 1921 Woolwich East by-election against Ramsay MacDonald. A great deal of attention was given in the campaign to the contrast between Gee as a Victoria Cross holder and Macdonald as a pacifist who opposed the war. Gee won the seat which he held until the next general election the following year, when he lost to the Labour Party candidate. He stood unsuccessfully in the 1923 Newcastle-upon-Tyne East by-election and in Bishop Auckland in the 1923 United Kingdom general election.

He was elected MP for Bosworth at the 1924 general election. He became disillusioned with parliamentary life however, and he was reported to have been absent from his political duties for over a year at the time of his resignation in 1927, having emigrated to the backwoods of Western Australia with no intention of returning. The subsequent 1927 Bosworth by-election was a Liberal gain.

He died in Perth, Western Australia, aged 84. He was cremated at the Karrakatta Crematorium. His VC is displayed at the Fusilier Museum in the Tower of London, England.

== See also ==
- William Buckingham VC

== Sources ==
- "Elegant Extracts" - The Royal Fusiliers Recipients of the VC (J.P. Kelleher, 2001)
- Monuments to Courage (David Harvey, 1999)
- Buzzell, Nora, ed. (1997). The Register of the Victoria Cross. Cheltenham, Gloucestershire: This England Alma House. ISBN 0-906324-27-0.
- Gliddon, Gerald (2012) [2004]. VCs of the First World War: Cambrai 1917. The History Press. ISBN 978-0-75-247668-1.

Parliament of the United Kingdom
Preceded by Will Crooks	Member of Parliament for Woolwich East; 1921–1922	Succeeded by Harry Snell
Preceded by George Ward	Member of Parliament for Bosworth; 1924–1927	Succeeded by William Edge
