= Claud Morris =

British newspaper publisher (1920–2000)

- Born: 20 January 1920; Angwinnack, Ludgvan, Cornwall
- Died: 21 May 2000 (aged 80); Angwinnack, Ludgvan
- Occupation: Publisher/Businessman
- Known for: Next Century Foundation
- Partner: Patricia (nee′ Holton)
- Children: one son and two daughters

Claud Morris (20 January 1920 – 21 May 2000) was a British newspaper owner who sought to make peace between Arabs and Israelis.

== Family and education ==
Born at Angwinnack, Ludgvan, near Penzance, Cornwall, he became a junior reporter to The Cornishman at the age of nine. He had to leave school after failing the Cornwall Schools examination and went to work at nearby Collurian Farm which sold butter to Harrods. He first saw his wife while having a meal in London in the autumn of 1948. When asked who he would marry he pointed to Patricia Holton, an American writer and broadcaster, who he had never seen before and replied ″That one there″. Morris followed her to America and they married in January 1949.

He died in the cottage he was born in, after a series of strokes and survived by his wife, a son, William and two daughters.

== Career ==
Leaving Collurian he worked as a porter at Penzance railway station for the Great Western Railway and with the free pass, that was part of his entitlement, he travelled to London to search for a post as a journalist. He landed his first job with The Dairy Farmer and later Farmers Weekly. He travelled to the West Indies in 1939 and Canada where he joined the Canadian Army at the outbreak of World War II, but was invalided out in 1941. Back in Britain, he started as a sub-editor on the Daily Express, and later as a personal assistant to Manny Shinwell, a Labour MP, writing speeches for members of the party. In 1949 he became political columnist for the Daily Mirror, and unsuccessfully standing as a Labour party candidate for Bristol West in 1950 and 1951.

In 1952, he bought a small South Wales newspaper, more than doubling its circulation in three years. He soon established himself as an independent publisher specialising in niche markets. Titles included the Voice of Malta, Ashanti Pioneer, Pilot (Nigeria). He published Welsh Nationalist Gwynfor Evans’s Welsh Nation and the successful South Wales Voice. In 1966 he tried to outbid Roy Thomson in an unsuccessful attempt to buy The Times. For a short time he published Free Palestine, discovering later that it was funded by the PLO.

In 1970 he was approached by Christopher Mayhew MP, who had just received £50,000 from the Sheikh Zayed of the UAE to publish a new magazine Middle East International (MEI). Morris agreed to be the publisher and became a Board member with a 40% stake. After Mayhew vetoed an article by Morris he published it in one of his own newspapers, the South Wales Magazine. There followed a successful campaign partly orchestrated by the Jewish Chronicle to get advertisers to boycott his newspapers. His printing press in South ًWales was destroyed in an unsolved arson attack. Free Palestine withdrew its contract; a key member of his administrative staff resigned and his senior foreman had a stroke. Despite a £20,000 donation from the Kuwaiti Ambassador to restore the press the business never recovered and MEI moved to a different publisher with Morris eventually severing relations.

In his autobiography Morris records that at this time he was approached by Jon Kimche, Middle East correspondent for the Evening Standard, suggesting a merger of MEI with Kimche’s New Middle East.

Morris founded another newspaper, Voice of the Arab World. He worked for the Libyan government with a weekly page in Al Fajr al Jadeed, producing a newsletter covering Libyan achievements as well as translating the Government ARNA output. He was also a contributor to the Emirate News and wrote a biography of Sheikh Zayed.

By the late 1980s, Morris had become convinced of the need to find a peaceful solution to the Arab-Israeli conflict, and in 1989 helped establish the Next Century Foundation

He wrote a two-volume autobiography -I Bought a Newspaper (1963) and The Last Inch: a Middle East Odyssey (1997).
