= John Minto (British politician) =

Scottish politician (1887–1965)

John Minto (18 November 1887 – 30 May 1965) was a Scottish politician, active in England.

== Life and career ==
Born in Kilmarnock, Minto left school at the age of 11, and completed an apprenticeship as an engineer, finding work in the shipyards. He joined the Independent Labour Party (ILP) in 1906, and worked closely with Jimmy Maxton. He was secretary of the Kilmarnock ILP in 1909, and president in 1910. During World War I, he served in the Royal Engineers, working on searchlights.

Minto struggled to find work after the war, and relocated to Leicester in 1919, where he served as secretary of the city's unemployed workers' committee. He later found work with the Leicester Co-operative Society, and joined the Amalgamated Engineering Union. In 1922, he was elected to Leicester City Council. He stood for the Labour Party in Bosworth at the 1924 general election, 1927 by-election and 1929 general election, coming only 271 votes from victory in 1927.

During the 1930s, Minto was active in the Socialist Sunday School movement and the Left Book Club. In 1944, he served as Lord Mayor of Leicester, and in the 1950s he was leader of the Labour group on the council.

Minto died on 30 May 1965, at the age of 77.

Trade union offices
Preceded by Charles Edward Gillot	Lord Mayor of Leicester; 1944–1945	Succeeded by Charles Edward Worthington
