= Hinckley and Bosworth (constituency) =

Parliamentary constituency in the United Kingdom, 1885 onwards

Coordinates: 52.6°N 1.4°W

- County constituency for the House of Commons
- Interactive map of boundaries since 2024
- Location within the East Midlands
- County: Leicestershire
- Population: 98,282 (2011 census)
- Electorate: 75,683 (March 2020)
- Major settlements: Hinckley, Barwell, Earl Shilton and Market Bosworth

Current constituency
- Created: 1885
- Member of Parliament: Luke Evans (Conservative)
- Seats: One
- Created from: South Leicestershire

Hinckley and Bosworth (/ˈbɒzwərθ/ BOZ-wərth) is a constituency (Note: A county constituency (for the purposes of election expenses and type of returning officer)) represented in the House of Commons of the UK Parliament since 2019 by Luke Evans, a Conservative. (Note: As with all constituencies, the constituency elects one Member of Parliament (MP) by the first past the post system of election at least every five years.)

Although the constituency had always, since its creation in 1885, contained the town of Hinckley, it was formally known as Bosworth up until the 2024 general election. Further to the 2023 review of Westminster constituencies, the Boundary Commission for England recommended that it be renamed Hinckley and Bosworth.

== Constituency profile ==
The Hinckley and Bosworth constituency is located in Leicestershire and covers rural areas to the west of Leicester. Its largest town is Hinckley, which has a population of around 51,000 when taken together with the connected village of Burbage. Other settlements include the market town of Earl Shilton, the small town of Market Bosworth and the villages of Barwell, Desford and Newbold Verdon. Hinckley is traditionally an important centre for hosiery production, and textile manufacturing still takes place in the town. Hinckley is well-connected by road and rail to the nearby cities of Leicester and Coventry. Earl Shilton also has a history of clothes manufacturing, and Market Bosworth is a historic market town known for being close to the site of the 1485 Battle of Bosworth Field where King Richard III was killed. The constituency has above-average levels of wealth, with the outer suburban areas of Hinckley falling within the top 10% least-deprived areas in England. House prices across the constituency are lower than the national average but higher than the rest of the East Midlands.

In general, residents of Hinckley and Bosworth are older and have high rates of homeownership compared to the rest of the country. Household income is higher than the regional average and a high proportion of residents work in the manufacturing and transport industries. White people made up 95% of the population at the 2021 census. At the local council level, Hinckley is represented by Liberal Democrats whilst Earl Shilton and the rural areas of the constituency mostly elected Conservative councillors. An estimated 60% of voters in the constituency supported leaving the European Union in the 2016 referendum, higher than the nationwide figure of 52%.

== Boundaries ==
Map of boundaries 2010–2024

=== Historic (Bosworth) ===
1885–1918: The Sessional Divisions of Ashby-de-la-Zouch (except the parishes of Bardon, Breedon, Thringstone, Osgathorpe, and Whitwick) and Market Bosworth.

1918–1950: The Urban Districts of Coalville and Hinckley, the Rural Districts of Hinckley and Market Bosworth, and the parish of Bardon in the Rural District of Ashby-de-la-Zouch.

1950–1955: The Urban Districts of Coalville and Hinckley, and the Rural District of Market Bosworth.

1955–1974: The Urban District of Coalville as constituted by the County of Leicester (Coalville Urban District) Confirmation Order 1953, the Urban District of Hinckley, and the Rural District of Market Bosworth.

1974–1983: The Urban Districts of Coalville and Hinckley as altered by the West Midland Counties Order 1965 and the County of Leicester (Coalville Urban District) Confirmation Order 1969, and the Rural District of Market Bosworth.

1983–1997: The Borough of Hinckley and Bosworth, and the Borough of Charnwood ward of Bradgate.

1997–2010: The Borough of Hinckley and Bosworth wards of Ambien, Bagworth, Barleston, Nailstone and Osbaston, Barwell, Burbage, Cadeby, Carlton and Market Bosworth, Castle, Clarendon, De Montfort, Desford and Peckleton, Earl Shilton, Markfield, Newbold Verdon, Sheepy and Witherley, Trinity, and Twycross and Shackerstone.

2010–2024: The Borough of Hinckley and Bosworth wards of Ambien, Barlestone, Nailstone and Osbaston, Barwell, Burbage St Catherines and Lash Hill, Burbage Sketchley and Stretton, Cadeby, Carlton and Market Bosworth with Shackerstone, Earl Shilton, Hinckley Castle, Hinckley Clarendon, Hinckley De Montfort, Hinckley Trinity, Markfield, Stanton and Fieldhead, Newbold Verdon with Desford and Peckleton, Ratby, Bagworth and Thornton, and Twycross and Witherley with Sheepy.

=== Current (Hinckley and Bosworth) ===
Further to the 2023 boundary review, the composition of the constituency is as follows from the 2024 general election (as they existed on 1 December 2020):

- The Borough of Hinckley and Bosworth wards of Ambien; Barlestone, Nailstone and Osbaston; Barwell; Burbage St. Catherines and Lash Hill; Burbage Sketchley and Stretton; Cadeby, Carlton and Market Bosworth with Shackerstone; Earl Shilton; Hinckley Castle; Hinckley Clarendon; Hinckley De Montfort; Hinckley Trinity; Newbold Verdon with Desford and Peckleton; Twycross and Witherley with Sheepy.
- The District of North West Leicestershire wards of Appleby; Oakthorpe & Donisthorpe.

Two Borough of Hinckley and Bosworth wards were transferred to the new constituency of Mid Leicestershire, partly offset by the addition of the two small wards from the District/constituency of North West Leicestershire.

== History ==
The Western, or Bosworth, division was created in 1885, and included part of the Ashby de la Zouch and all of the Market Bosworth petty sessional divisions. It was redefined in 1918 to cover the urban districts of Coalville and Hinckley, the rural districts of Hinckley and Market Bosworth and the civil parish of Bardon from Ashby RD. Hinckley RD was abolished in the 1930s and in 1948 and 1970 the Bosworth constituency by which date it was shaped to eventually all of Coalville, Hinckley and Market Bosworth RD. Coalville has been part of North West Leicestershire since the 1983 election.

The seat was held by Labour for 25 years until the Conservatives gained it in the 1970 general election and they have represented it since then. Hinckley expanded greatly after World War II and is the most economically significant town other than Leicester in Leicestershire however unlike the borough the constituency retains under the independent Boundary Commission the poetic name of Bosworth, alluding to the Battle of Bosworth of the medieval Wars of the Roses which is recreated annually on the battlefield.

The seat had a coal mining tradition; however, other industry, such as defence, trade and retail supports the residential town of Hinckley and its rural hinterland. The area of strongest Labour support is the former mining village of Earl Shilton, which is now in local elections generally over-shadowed by surrounding areas with majority-Conservative support. The constituency was once held for Labour by Woodrow Wyatt, who later left the party and became one of its most voluble critics in the 1980s.

During the 2015 count, a police car outside the Hinckley Leisure Centre, where the count was taking place, caught fire then exploded while being hosed down by firefighters. Five men were arrested.

== Members of Parliament ==
South Leicestershire prior to 1885

Election	Member	Party
1885	James Ellis	Liberal
1892	Charles McLaren	Liberal
1910	Henry McLaren	Liberal
1916	Henry McLaren	Coalition Liberal
Jan 1922	Henry McLaren	National Liberal
1922	Guy Paget	Unionist
1923	George Ward	Liberal
1924	Robert Gee	Unionist
1927 by-election	Sir William Edge	Liberal
1931	Sir William Edge	Liberal National
1945	Arthur Allen	Labour
1959	Woodrow Wyatt	Labour
1970	Adam Butler	Conservative
1987	David Tredinnick	Conservative
2019	Luke Evans	Conservative

== Elections ==
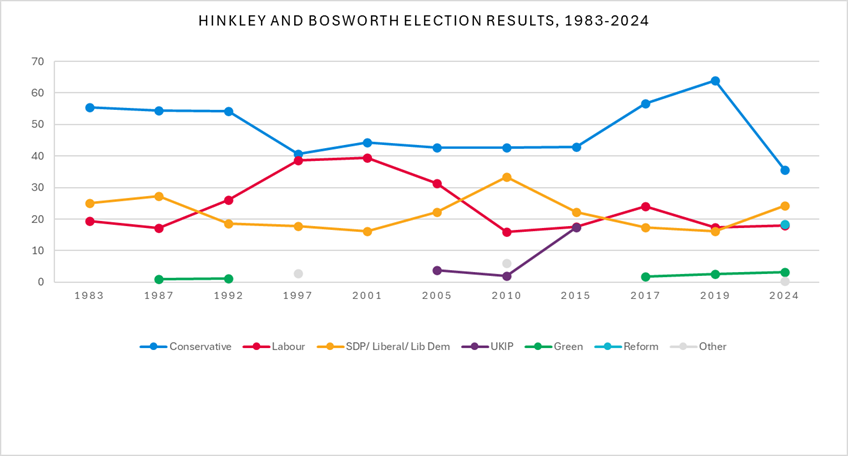
Hinckley & Bosworth election results 1983–2024

=== Elections in the 2020s ===
General election 2024: Hinckley and Bosworth
Party	Candidate	Votes	%	±%
Conservative	Luke Evans	17,032	35.6	−29.0
Liberal Democrats	Michael Mullaney	11,624	24.3	+6.1
Reform	Peter Cheshire	8,817	18.4	N/A
Labour	Rebecca Pawley	8,601	18.0	+3.8
Green	Cassie Wells	1,514	3.2	+0.3
Independent	Harry Masters	211	0.4	N/A
Majority		5,408	11.3	−35.3
Turnout		47,799	62.5	−6.7
Registered electors		76,431		
Conservative hold		Swing		

=== Elections in the 2010s ===
General election 2019: Bosworth
Party	Candidate	Votes	%	±%
Conservative	Luke Evans	36,056	63.9	+7.2
Labour	Rick Middleton	9,778	17.3	−6.8
Liberal Democrats	Michael Mullaney	9,096	16.1	−1.2
Green	Mick Gregg	1,502	2.7	+0.8
Majority		26,278	46.6	+14.0
Turnout		56,432	69.2	−0.4
Conservative hold		Swing	+7.0	

General election 2017: Bosworth
Party	Candidate	Votes	%	±%
Conservative	David Tredinnick	31,864	56.7	+13.9
Labour	Chris Kealey	13,513	24.1	+6.6
Liberal Democrats	Michael Mullaney	9,744	17.3	−5.0
Green	Mick Gregg	1,047	1.9	New
Majority		18,351	32.6	+12.1
Turnout		56,168	69.6	+2.6
Conservative hold		Swing		

General election 2015: Bosworth
Party	Candidate	Votes	%	±%
Conservative	David Tredinnick	22,939	42.8	+0.2
Liberal Democrats	Michael Mullaney	11,951	22.3	−11.0
Labour	Chris Kealey	9,354	17.5	+1.5
UKIP	David Sprason	9,338	17.4	+15.4
Majority		10,988	20.5	+11.2
Turnout		53,582	67.0	−3.2
Conservative hold		Swing	+5.6	

Going into the 2015 general election, this was the 180th most marginal constituency in Great Britain, the Liberal Democrats requiring a swing from the Conservatives of 4.6% to take the seat (based on the result of the 2010 general election).

General election 2010: Bosworth
Party	Candidate	Votes	%	±%
Conservative	David Tredinnick	23,132	42.6	0.0
Liberal Democrats	Michael Mullaney	18,100	33.3	+11.7
Labour	Rory Palmer	8,674	16.0	−15.9
BNP	John Ryde	2,458	4.5	New
UKIP	Dutch Veldhuizen	1,098	2.0	−1.9
English Democrat	James Lampitt	615	1.1	New
Science	Michael Brooks	197	0.4	New
Majority		5,032	9.3	−1.9
Turnout		54,274	70.2	+3.8
Conservative hold		Swing		

=== Elections in the 2000s ===
General election 2005: Bosworth
Party	Candidate	Votes	%	±%
Conservative	David Tredinnick	20,212	42.6	−1.8
Labour	Rupert Herd	14,893	31.4	−8.0
Liberal Democrats	James Moore	10,528	22.2	+6.0
UKIP	Denis Walker	1,866	3.9	New
Majority		5,319	11.2	+6.2
Turnout		47,499	66.3	+1.9
Conservative hold		Swing	+3.1	

General election 2001: Bosworth
Party	Candidate	Votes	%	±%
Conservative	David Tredinnick	20,030	44.4	+3.8
Labour	Andrew Furlong	17,750	39.4	+0.7
Liberal Democrats	Jon Ellis	7,326	16.2	−1.6
Majority		2,280	5.0	+3.0
Turnout		45,106	64.4	−12.0
Conservative hold		Swing	+1.5	

=== Elections in the 1990s ===
General election 1997: Bosworth
Party	Candidate	Votes	%	±%
Conservative	David Tredinnick	21,189	40.6	−11.0
Labour	Andrew Furlong	20,162	38.7	+12.3
Liberal Democrats	Jon Ellis	9,281	17.8	−2.9
Referendum	Scott Halborg	1,521	2.9	New
Majority		1,027	2.0	−26.2
Turnout		52,153	76.4	
Conservative hold		Swing		

General election 1992: Bosworth
Party	Candidate	Votes	%	±%
Conservative	David Tredinnick	36,618	54.2	−0.2
Labour	David B. Everitt	17,524	26.0	+8.8
Liberal Democrats	Gregory M. Drozdz	12,643	18.7	−8.6
Green	Brian Fewster	716	1.1	+0.1
Majority		19,094	28.2	+1.1
Turnout		67,501	84.1	+2.8
Conservative hold		Swing	−4.5	

=== Elections in the 1980s ===
General election 1987: Bosworth
Party	Candidate	Votes	%	±%
Conservative	David Tredinnick	34,145	54.4	−1.0
Liberal (SDP)	David Bill	17,129	27.3	+2.2
Labour	Richard Hall	10,787	17.2	−2.3
Green	Dinah Freer	660	1.0	New
Majority		17,016	27.1	−3.2
Turnout		62,721	81.3	+3.1
Conservative hold		Swing		

General election 1983: Bosworth
Party	Candidate	Votes	%	±%
Conservative	Adam Butler	31,663	55.4	
SDP (Liberal)	Malcolm Fox	14,369	25.1	
Labour	Daniel Janner	11,120	19.5	
Majority		17,294	30.3	
Turnout		57,152	78.2	
Conservative hold		Swing		

=== Elections in the 1970s ===
General election 1979: Bosworth
Party	Candidate	Votes	%	±%
Conservative	Adam Butler	37,030	48.51	+7.07
Labour	Derek Fatchett	28,595	37.46	−3.53
Liberal	Thomas Brown	10,032	13.14	−4.43
National Front	David Dunn	682	0.89	New
Majority		8,435	11.05	+10.61
Turnout		76,339		
Conservative hold		Swing	+5.31	

General election October 1974: Bosworth
Party	Candidate	Votes	%	±%
Conservative	Adam Butler	28,490	41.43	+2.04
Labour	Martyn Sloman	28,188	40.99	+3.96
Liberal	Morris Galton	12,082	17.57	−6.02
Majority		302	0.44	−1.92
Turnout		68,760	82.03	
Conservative hold		Swing		

General election February 1974: Bosworth
Party	Candidate	Votes	%	±%
Conservative	Adam Butler	28,151	39.39	−11.48
Labour	Martyn Sloman	26,464	37.03	−12.10
Liberal	Morris Galton	16,859	23.59	New
Majority		1,687	2.36	+0.61
Turnout		71,474	85.99	
Conservative hold		Swing		

General election 1970: Bosworth
Party	Candidate	Votes	%	±%
Conservative	Adam Butler	30,732	50.87	+14.88
Labour	Woodrow Wyatt	29,677	49.13	−1.10
Majority		1,055	1.74	−12.50
Turnout		60,409	77.14	
Conservative gain from Labour		Swing		

=== Elections in the 1960s ===
General election 1966: Bosworth
Party	Candidate	Votes	%	±%
Labour	Woodrow Wyatt	27,427	50.23	+4.64
Conservative	C J Philip Wood	19,654	35.99	+0.75
Liberal	Anthony H Extance	7,526	13.78	−5.39
Majority		7,773	14.24	+3.89
Turnout		54,607	79.76	
Labour hold		Swing		

General election 1964: Bosworth
Party	Candidate	Votes	%	±%
Labour	Woodrow Wyatt	25,334	45.59	−5.70
Conservative	Percy Laurence Braithwaite	19,583	35.24	−13.47
Liberal	John H David	10,652	19.17	New
Majority		5,751	10.35	+7.77
Turnout		55,569	82.80	
Labour hold		Swing		

=== Elections in the 1950s ===
General election 1959: Bosworth
Party	Candidate	Votes	%	±%
Labour	Woodrow Wyatt	27,734	51.29	−2.72
Conservative	Percy Laurence Braithwaite	26,341	48.71	+2.72
Majority		1,393	2.58	−5.44
Turnout		54,075	83.05	
Labour hold		Swing		

General election 1955: Bosworth
Party	Candidate	Votes	%	±%
Labour	Arthur Allen	27,626	54.01	−3.08
Conservative	Donald Charles Bray	23,526	45.99	+3.08
Majority		4,100	8.02	−6.17
Turnout		51,152	80.73	
Labour hold		Swing		

General election 1951: Bosworth
Party	Candidate	Votes	%	±%
Labour	Arthur Allen	30,767	57.09	+3.45
Conservative	Donald Charles Bray	23,122	42.91	+13.62
Majority		7,645	14.18	−24.35
Turnout		53,889	85.42	
Labour hold		Swing		

General election 1950: Bosworth
Party	Candidate	Votes	%	±%
Labour	Arthur Allen	29,282	53.64	−1.99
Conservative	A Cripps	15,988	29.29	
Liberal	Leonard Wright Harvey	9,315	17.07	New
Majority		13,294	24.35	+13.09
Turnout		54,585	88.07	
Labour hold		Swing		

=== Elections in the 1940s ===
General election 1945: Bosworth
Party	Candidate	Votes	%	±%
Labour	Arthur Allen	26,151	55.63	
National Liberal	James Millard Tucker	20,854	44.37	
Majority		5,297	11.26	N/A
Turnout		47,005	77.49	
Labour gain from National Liberal		Swing		

=== Elections in the 1930s ===
General election 1935: Bosworth
Party	Candidate	Votes	%	±%
National Liberal	William Edge	22,969	59.22	
Labour	C Rothwell	15,816	40.78	
Majority		7,153	18.44	
Turnout		38,785	73.33	
National Liberal hold		Swing		

General election 1931: Bosworth
Party	Candidate	Votes	%	±%
National Liberal	William Edge	26,926	68.00	
Labour	John Morgan	12,670	32.00	
Majority		14,256	36.00	N/A
Turnout		39,596	79.72	
National Liberal gain from Liberal		Swing		

=== Election in the 1920s ===
General election 1929: Bosworth
Party	Candidate	Votes	%	±%
Liberal	William Edge	17,044	41.4	+7.8
Labour	John Minto	15,244	37.0	+5.5
Unionist	Sydney Lipscomb Elborne	8,861	21.5	−13.4
Majority		1,800	4.4	N/A
Turnout		41,149	85.9	+5.1
Registered electors		47,912		
Liberal gain from Unionist		Swing	+10.7	

- % change and swing from 1924

1927 Bosworth by-election
Party	Candidate	Votes	%	±%
Liberal	William Edge	11,981	38.2	+4.6
Labour	John Minto	11,710	37.3	+5.8
Unionist	Edward Spears	7,685	24.5	−10.4
Majority		271	0.9	N/A
Turnout		31,376	84.6	+3.8
Registered electors		37,092		
Liberal gain from Unionist		Swing	+7.5	

General election 1924: Bosworth
Party	Candidate	Votes	%	±%
Unionist	Robert Gee	10,114	34.9	+5.0
Liberal	George Ward	9,756	33.6	−7.6
Labour	John Minto	9,143	31.5	+2.6
Majority		358	1.3	N/A
Turnout		29,013	80.8	+0.5
Registered electors		35,925		
Unionist gain from Liberal		Swing	+6.3	

General election 1923: Bosworth
Party	Candidate	Votes	%	±%
Liberal	George Ward	11,596	41.2	+13.9
Unionist	Guy Paget	8,430	29.9	−11.0
Labour	Emrys Hughes	8,152	28.9	−2.9
Majority		3,166	11.3	N/A
Turnout		28,178	80.3	−0.7
Registered electors		35,090		
Liberal gain from Unionist		Swing	+12.5	

General election 1922: Bosworth
Party	Candidate	Votes	%	±%
Unionist	Guy Paget	11,251	40.9	New
Labour	Clement Bundock	8,740	31.8	−1.8
National Liberal	Henry McLaren	7,513	27.3	−39.1
Majority		2,511	9.1	N/A
Turnout		27,504	81.0	+22.4
Registered electors		33,937		
Unionist gain from National Liberal		Swing	N/A	

=== Election in the 1910s ===
General election 1918: Bosworth
Party		Candidate	Votes	%	±%
C	National Liberal	Henry McLaren	12,545	66.4	+1.9
	Labour	Thomas Richardson	6,344	33.6	New
Majority			6,201	32.8	+3.8
Turnout			18,889	58.6	−26.3
Registered electors			32,242		
	National Liberal hold		Swing	N/A	
C indicates candidate endorsed by the coalition government.

== Election results 1885–1918 ==
=== Elections in the 1880s ===
General election 1885: Bosworth
Party	Candidate	Votes	%	±%
Liberal	James Ellis	5,648	64.9	
Conservative	Sackville Stopford-Sackville	3,051	35.1	
Majority		2,597	29.8	
Turnout		8,699	87.7	
Registered electors		9,919		
Liberal win (new seat)				

General election 1886: Bosworth
Party	Candidate	Votes	%	±%
Liberal	James Ellis	4,732	57.9	−7.0
Conservative	Harrington Hulton	3,440	42.1	+7.0
Majority		1,292	15.8	−14.0
Turnout		8,172	82.4	−5.3
Registered electors		9,919		
Liberal hold		Swing	-7.0	

=== Elections in the 1890s ===
McLaren

General election 1892: Bosworth
Party	Candidate	Votes	%	±%
Liberal	Charles McLaren	5,370	58.3	+0.4
Conservative	Harrington Hulton	3,846	41.7	−0.4
Majority		1,524	16.6	+0.8
Turnout		9,216	87.1	+4.7
Registered electors		10,586		
Liberal hold		Swing	+0.4	

General election 1895: Bosworth
Party	Candidate	Votes	%	±%
Liberal	Charles McLaren	5,327	55.9	−2.4
Conservative	Sir Thomas Cope, 1st Baronet	4,207	44.1	+2.4
Majority		1,120	11.8	−4.8
Turnout		9,534	87.8	+0.7
Registered electors		10,854		
Liberal hold		Swing	-2.4	

=== Elections in the 1900s ===
General election 1900: Bosworth
Party	Candidate	Votes	%	±%
Liberal	Charles McLaren	Unopposed		
Liberal hold				

General election 1906: Bosworth
Party	Candidate	Votes	%	±%
Liberal	Charles McLaren	7,678	67.9	N/A
Liberal Unionist	Allen Henry Philip Stoneham	3,627	32.1	New
Majority		4,051	35.8	N/A
Turnout		11,305	86.2	N/A
Registered electors		13,114		
Liberal hold		Swing	N/A	

=== Elections in the 1910s ===
General election January 1910: Bosworth
Party	Candidate	Votes	%	±%
Liberal	Charles McLaren	7,709	63.5	−4.4
Conservative	Keith Fraser	4,427	36.5	+4.4
Majority		3,282	27.0	−8.8
Turnout		12,136	88.7	+2.5
Liberal hold		Swing	-4.4	

General election December 1910: Bosworth
Party	Candidate	Votes	%	±%
Liberal	Henry McLaren	7,500	64.5	+1.0
Conservative	Dudley Beaumont Melchior Gurowski	4,120	35.5	−1.0
Majority		3,380	29.0	+2.0
Turnout		11,620	84.9	−3.8
Liberal hold		Swing	+1.0	

General Election 1914–15:

Another General Election was required to take place before the end of 1915. The political parties had been making preparations for an election to take place and by July 1914, the following candidates had been selected;

- Liberal: Henry McLaren
- Unionist:

== See also ==
- List of parliamentary constituencies in Leicestershire and Rutland
