= Sir William Edge, 1st Baronet =

British politician

The Honourable Sir William Edge

Member of Parliament for Bosworth
- In office 31 May 1927 – 15 June 1945
- Preceded by: Robert Gee
- Succeeded by: Arthur Allen

Member of Parliament for Bolton
- In office 14 December 1918 – 16 November 1923
- Preceded by: Thomas Taylor
- Succeeded by: Albert Law

Personal details
- Born: 21 November 1880
- Died: 18 December 1948 (aged 68) Lytham
- Party: National Liberal; Liberal
- Education: Bolton School

Sir William Edge, 1st Baronet (21 November 1880 – 18 December 1948) was a British Liberal, later National Liberal, politician and businessman.

== Early life ==
William Edge was the son of Sir Knowles Edge, head of William Edge & Son Ltd, colour manufacturers, who was Mayor of Bolton from 1917 to 1918. He was educated at Bolton School and went into his father's business, eventually becoming the head of the company.

== Politics ==
However, politics was Edge's main interest, and he was active in support of the Liberal Party in Lancashire, with a reputation as a good platform speaker, before getting into Parliament. In February 1916, Edge was returned unopposed as a Liberal for Bolton following the resignation of the sitting Liberal Member of Parliament (MP) in the two member constituency, Thomas Taylor. At that time he was styled Captain Edge since he held a staff appointment in the War Office and his professional background was described to the electorate as a Bolton manufacturer. Edge was returned unopposed again in the 1918 general election as was the Labour candidate and the other sitting MP, Robert Tootill.

From 1919 to 1922, Edge was a Joint Lord of the Treasury with his main role being to act as liaison between the Coalition government and the Labour Party.

He was re-elected for Bolton in the 1922 general election standing as a National Liberal, that is as a supporter of the former coalition government and the Lloyd George faction in the Liberal Party, against Conservative, Labour and Asquithian Liberal opposition. Despite the decision of the Conservative Party at the Carlton Club meeting of 19 October 1922 to end the Coalition Government, there was clearly some goodwill remaining between the parties in Bolton as only one candidate from each stood in the election, and there must have been some crossover of votes from the Conservatives to Edge. The Independent Liberal came bottom of the poll, behind the two Labour candidates. Edge was one of the National Liberal whips from 1922 to 1923 but resigned in protest at the government's industrial policy of safeguarding (i.e. tariff protection), as it particularly affected the cotton industry through a proposed duty on fabric gloves – important in his Lancashire constituency. He was knighted in 1922.

However, along with many other former National Liberals, Edge was unable to hold his seat at the 1923 general election. The Conservative votes no longer transferred, and Labour and the independent Liberal party, which had reunited with many former coalitionists, were making advances.

== Lloyd George ==
As is perhaps to be expected from a supporter of the wartime coalition, Edge was politically close to David Lloyd George. According to A. J. Sylvester, Lloyd George's private secretary, Edge was one of LG's most stalwart friends. In 1925, Edge was appointed as one of the trustees of the Lloyd George fund and he stayed a loyal supporter of Lloyd George through the years. In 1940 (before the catalyst of the Norway debate brought Winston Churchill to power) Edge was involved in talks with Labour about the possibility of Labour joining a coalition government to be led by Lloyd George to replace Neville Chamberlain. One of the Liberal causes Edge particularly espoused was the Land and Nation League, a Group set up by Lloyd George in October 1925 to promote his land campaigns and in support of the report of the Liberal Land Enquiry Committee, Land and the Nation published as the Green Book.

== Bosworth by-election and after ==
Edge returned to the House of Commons at a by-election for Bosworth in Leicestershire on 31 May 1927. His victory there was part of a pattern of Liberal success begun in 1926 after the General Strike, and Lloyd George's taking over the leadership of the party from Asquith had changed the political scene. According to Cook and Ramsden: "As so often when Lloyd George was involved, his old dynamism and energy brought a new sense of purpose. Within six months of his return, it seemed that at long last a real recovery was at hand." Between March 1927 and March 1929 the Liberals won six by-elections.

Lloyd George helped his old friend by speaking for Edge at by-election meetings. The result at Bosworth was Edge 11,981, J. Minto (Labour) 11,710, E. L. Spears (Conservative) 7,685: giving a majority of 271 after a recount demanded by Labour. Turnout was 84.6%. Edge held his seat at the 1931 general election and the 1935 general election general elections when he stood as a Liberal National, but did not contest the seat in the 1945 general election.

In the troubled period of the 1930s for Liberals, Edge's political alignment was sometimes difficult to pin down. Edge was one of the group of 22 Liberals MPs who followed Sir John Simon in declaring themselves a body to give firm support to the prime minister as the head of a National Government and for the purpose of fighting the General Election on 5 October 1931

The Liberal Nationals were closely associated with the Conservatives. In time they actually merged with the Tories. By 1929, Edge was described as a 'near Conservative' – although one Labour junior minister noted that he voted with the Labour government in December 1929 on the Coal Mines Bill when most Liberals were joining the Tories to oppose the introduction of a seven-and-a-half-hour working day and a National Wages Board and that Edge also voted with the Labour government in January 1931 on the Trades Disputes Bill. Edge was created a baronet in the 1937 Coronation Honours.

== Outside Parliament ==
Edge was a Wesleyan Methodist. On 3 September 1932, a stone laying ceremony was held for the new Methodist Church at Stoke Golding, near Hinckley, and Edge laid one of the stones. He placed in a cavity a sealed bottle containing the current preaching plan, an issue of The Hinckley Times and Guardian and other documents.

On a lighter note, in 1930 Edge agreed to take part in a race against some homing pigeons released from the Palace of Westminster by Ibstock Homing Association. He raced by motor-car and rail, but his train was delayed and got in late at Leicester, causing Edge to arrive two minutes after the pigeons, so losing the race.

He died at his home at Lytham in Lancashire, aged 68.

Parliament of the United Kingdom
Preceded by Thomas Taylor; Robert Tootill	Member of Parliament for Bolton; 1916–1923; With: Robert Tootill 1916–1922; William Russell 1922–1923	Succeeded by Sir Joseph Herbert Cunliffe; Albert Law
Preceded by Robert Gee	Member of Parliament for Bosworth; 1927–1945	Succeeded by Arthur Allen
Baronetage of the United Kingdom
New creation	Baronet (of Ribble Lodge, Lancashire); 1937–1948	Succeeded by Knowles Edge
