= Harry Snell, 1st Baron Snell =

British Labour politician (1865–1944)

The Right Honourable The Lord Snell CH CBE PC
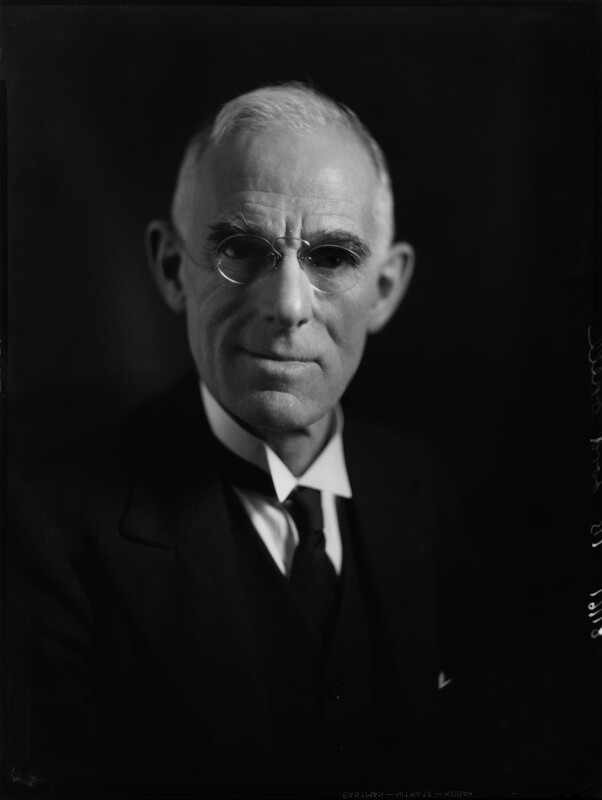
- Snell in 1936

Captain of the Honourable Corps of Gentlemen-at-Arms
- In office 31 May 1940 – 21 April 1944
- Monarch: George VI
- Prime Minister: Winston Churchill
- Preceded by: The Earl of Lucan
- Succeeded by: The Earl Fortescue

Parliamentary Under-Secretary of State for India
- In office 13 March 1931 – 24 August 1931
- Monarch: George V
- Prime Minister: Ramsay MacDonald
- Preceded by: The Earl Russell
- Succeeded by: The Marquess of Lothian

Member of the House of Lords Lord Temporal
- In office 23 March 1931 – 21 April 1944; Hereditary Peerage
- Preceded by: Peerage created
- Succeeded by: Peerage extinct

Member of Parliament for Woolwich East
- In office 15 November 1922 – 22 March 1931
- Preceded by: Robert Gee
- Succeeded by: George Hicks

Personal details
- Born: 1 April 1865 Sutton-on-Trent in Nottinghamshire, England
- Died: 21 April 1944 (aged 79) London, England

Henry Snell, 1st Baron Snell CH CBE PC (1 April 1865 – 21 April 1944), was a British socialist politician and campaigner. He served in government under Ramsay MacDonald and Winston Churchill, and as the Labour Party's leader in the House of Lords in the late 1930s.

== Background ==
Born in Sutton-on-Trent in Nottinghamshire, the son of agricultural workers, Harry Snell was educated at his local village school before beginning work as a farm hand at the age of eight. He worked full-time from the age of ten and became an indoor servant at the farm aged twelve. Dissatisfied with this work, Snell left and travelled around the county, taking a variety of jobs including work as a groom and at Hazelford Ferry on the River Trent and as a French polisher in Nottingham. During long periods of unemployment he occupied himself with extensive reading, and was particularly influenced by the writing of Henry George. Inspired by Charles Bradlaugh and the cause of secularism in Nottingham 1881, he joined the National Secular Society. He rejected the austere and literalist Anglicanism of his up-bringing, but retained some religious faith and decided to join the Unitarian Church, impressed by its scientific approach to Christian doctrine and its progressive and tolerant values.

A Unitarian teacher, John Kentish-White, introduced Snell to the works of Lord Byron and Samuel Taylor Coleridge. Through acquaintances made in the Unitarian movement, Snell was able to find a job in London as a clerk at the offices of the Midland Institute for the Blind. Here he continued his self-education at the reference library of University College London, being influenced by the writings of Thomas Paine, William Morris, John Ruskin and John Stuart Mill. Eventually Unitarianism would grow even too strict for him, and he became an agnostic and member of the National Secular Society, and a "devoted advocate" of the Ethical Union (now Humanists UK). Of his ties to the British Ethical movement, he once remarked:

Although political and Labour questions arrested my attention, and made constant demands on my time and energies, my deepest and most abiding interests were in religion and ethics, and to these great subjects that the best thought and work of my life has been given.

After hearing Annie Besant address a meeting of the Secular Society on the subject of socialism, Snell joined the Social Democratic Federation. He worked on John Burns' campaign for Parliament in 1885, and began to address public meetings himself, appearing alongside the likes of Henry Hyndman, Tom Mann, Eleanor Marx and Ben Tillett. He was active in supporting the Bryant and May match factory strike and the London dock strike of 1889.

== Member of Parliament ==
In 1890, Snell began social work for the Woolwich Charity Organisation Society, and later became secretary to the director of the London School of Economics. He joined the Independent Labour Party and, in 1894, the Fabian Society, travelling extensively around Britain to lecture on socialist topics with speakers including Ramsay MacDonald and Bruce Glasier. Snell also lectured for the British South Place Ethical Society (eventually becoming president) and its American counterpart. Snell stood unsuccessfully in Huddersfield as a candidate for the Labour Party in January and December 1910 and 1918. He was elected to the London County Council in 1919, serving until 1925, and became Member of Parliament for Woolwich East, the seat formerly held by Will Crooks, at the 1922 General Election, being re-elected in 1929.

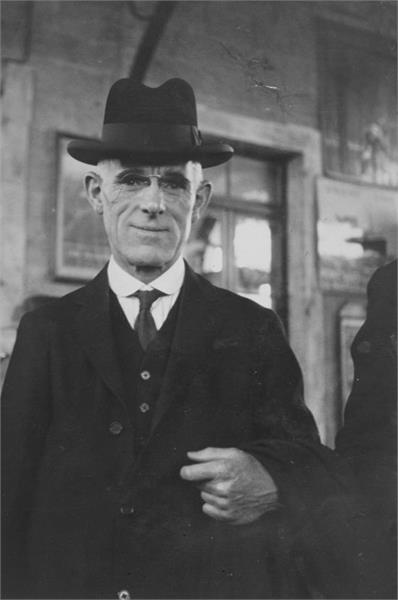
Harry Snell 1929

In late 1929, Snell was appointed to the Shaw Commission, which had been set up to investigate Arab uprisings in Palestine. When the Commission published its findings in March 1931, Snell delivered a Minority Report, disagreeing with the commission's recommendation that Jewish immigration and land purchase be curtailed. Snell also dissented from the commission's claims that Palestine was overcrowded, agreeing with reports published two years earlier that had found the area to be under-populated and greatly under-cultivated. He described the impact of Jewish immigration as having raised the standard of living for Arab workers, and asserted that the commission was wrongly and dangerously encouraging the view that immigration was a menace to Arabs and threatened their economic future. Following this, Snell became a strong supporter of Zionism.

From 1931 to 1932, he served as President of the British Ethical Union (now known as Humanists UK), an organisation promoting humanism as a non-religious basis for morality.

Snell was appointed a Commander of the Order of the British Empire (CBE) in the 1930 Birthday Honours.

== House of Lords ==
Snell resigned his seat in the Commons in 1931, to make way for George Hicks, a leading member of the Trades Union Congress, and was raised to the peerage as Baron Snell, of Plumstead in the County of Kent, on 23 March 1931. Ramsay MacDonald made him Under-Secretary of State for India and, upon the formation of the National Government a few months later, asked Snell to continue in this role. However, Snell refused, choosing to remain loyal to the Labour Party. In the Lords, he spoke on agricultural issues, with particular concern for rural workers, and on foreign affairs, and was a member of the British Institute of Parliamentary Affairs and the Empire Parliamentary Association. He was also appointed to the British Council, eventually becoming vice-chairman. In 1935, when Arthur Ponsonby chose to resign with George Lansbury, Snell became Labour's leader in the Lords, serving under Clement Attlee. He published an autobiography, Men, Movements and Myself, in 1936, and was made a Privy Counsellor in 1937.

As leader in the Lords, Snell took a strong line against the growing threat of fascism, and attacked the Government's appeasement of Nazi Germany and its refusal to intervene to help the Republican government during the Spanish Civil War. He also continued to champion Zionism. During a debate in the Lords in 1938 he spoke in support of the policy of population transfer of Arabs in Palestine for the purposes of developing the land and creating cohesive settlements, pointing out that similar transfers had occurred in Libya and other Arab countries without any protest. Aged seventy-five and with his health failing, he stood down as leader of the Labour peers in 1940. However, he recovered and was appointed by Winston Churchill as Captain of the Honourable Corps of Gentlemen-at-Arms (Deputy Leader of the House of Lords) a year later (having been considered as Leader, but passed over in favour of a Conservative). He chaired several committees and inquiries during the Second World War, and was appointed a Member of the Order of the Companions of Honour in 1943. Whilst still in the role of Deputy Leader, Snell fell ill at the end of March 1944, and died less than a month later, his peerage becoming extinct at that time.

His humanist funeral was conducted by his friend H.J. Blackham, where Clement Attlee was among the mourners in a private ceremony.

== See also ==
- Shaw Commission

Parliament of the United Kingdom
Preceded by Robert Gee	Member of Parliament for Woolwich East; 1922–1931	Succeeded by George Hicks
Political offices
Preceded by The Earl Russell	Under-Secretary of State for India; 1929–1931	Succeeded by The Marquess of Lothian
Preceded by Ernest Dence	Chairman of the London County Council; 1934–1938	Succeeded by Ewart Culpin
Preceded by The Earl of Lucan	Captain of the Gentlemen-at-Arms; 1940–1944	Vacant Title next held by The Earl Fortescue
Party political offices
Preceded by Robert Ensor	London Division representative on the Independent Labour Party National Administrative Council; 1910–1911	Succeeded by Harry Dubery
Preceded by The Lord Ponsonby of Shulbrede	Leader of the Labour Party in the House of Lords; 1935–1940	Succeeded by The Lord Addison
Peerage of the United Kingdom
New creation	Baron Snell; 1931–1944	Extinct
