= 1951 Woolwich East by-election =

UK Parliamentary by-election

The 1951 Woolwich East by-election of 14 June 1951 was held after the death of Labour MP Ernest Bevin. The seat was safe, having been won at the 1950 United Kingdom general election by over 12,000 votes

The by-election was easily won by Labour's Christopher Mayhew.

== Result of the previous general election ==
General election 1950: Woolwich East
Party	Candidate	Votes	%	±%
Labour	Ernest Bevin	26,604	61.59	
Conservative	J. D. Campbell	14,234	32.95	
Liberal	A. M. Sage	1,504	3.48	
Communist	Rajani Palme Dutt	601	1.39	
Independent	F. Hancock	252	0.58	
Majority		12,370	28.64	
Turnout		42,948		
Labour win (new seat)				

== Result of the by-election ==
By-election 1951: Woolwich East
Party	Candidate	Votes	%	±%
Labour	Christopher Mayhew	20,801	60.73	−0.86
Conservative	Richard Harvey	13,449	39.27	+6.32
Majority		7,352	21.46	−7.18
Turnout		42,402		
Labour hold		Swing	-3.59	
