= 1931 Woolwich East by-election =

UK Parliamentary by-election

The 1931 Woolwich East by-election was held on 15 April 1931. The by-election was held due to the elevation to the peerage of the incumbent Labour MP, Henry Snell. It was won by the Labour candidate George Hicks.

Woolwich East by-election, 1931
Party	Candidate	Votes	%	±%
Labour	George Hicks	16,200	56.7	−6.5
Conservative	Edward Shrapnell-Smith	12,357	43.3	+6.5
Majority		3,843	13.4	−13.0
Turnout		28,737	66.6	−9.0
Labour hold		Swing		
