= Woolwich East (UK Parliament constituency) =

Parliamentary constituency in the United Kingdom, 1918–1983

Coordinates: 51.49°N 0.10°E

- Former borough constituency for the House of Commons
- County: Greater London

1918–1983
- Seats: One
- Created from: Woolwich
- Replaced by: Woolwich

Woolwich East was a parliamentary constituency represented in the House of Commons of the Parliament of the United Kingdom from 1918 until 1983. Its seat was Woolwich, now in the Royal Borough of Greenwich in south-east London.

The constituency was formed for the 1918 general election, when the constituency of Woolwich was divided into Woolwich East and Woolwich West, and abolished in 1983 when it was largely replaced by a new Woolwich constituency. Between 1950 and 1974 it included North Woolwich on the north bank of the River Thames; this was then transferred to Newham South.

Throughout its 65-year existence, the constituency elected Labour MPs with the sole exception of a Conservative elected in a 1921 by-election.

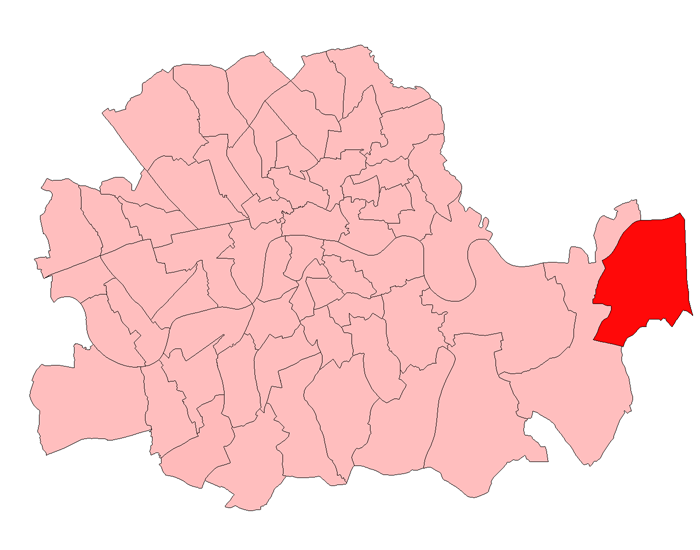
Woolwich East in the County of London 1918-50

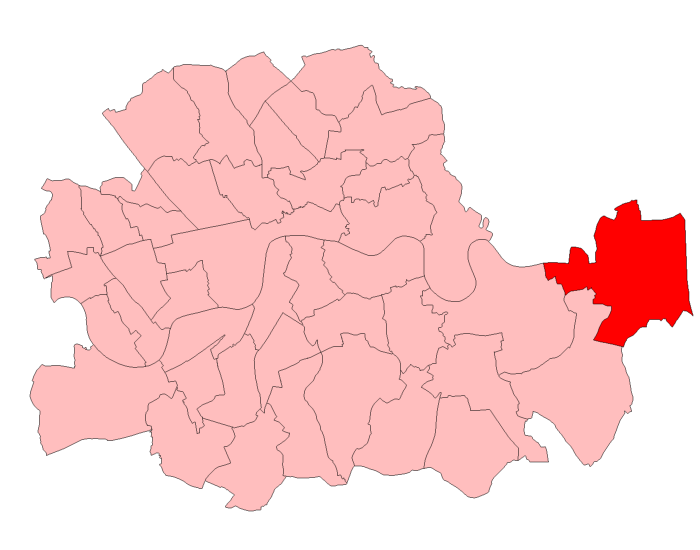
Woolwich East in the County of London 1950-74

== Boundaries ==
1918–1950: The Metropolitan Borough of Woolwich wards of Burrage, Central, Glyndon, St Margaret's, and St Nicholas.

1950–1955: The Metropolitan Borough of Woolwich wards of Abbey Wood, Burrage, Central, Dockyard, Glyndon, River, St Margaret's, St Mary's, and St Nicholas.

1955–1974: The Metropolitan Borough of Woolwich wards of Abbey Wood, Burrage, Central, Glyndon, River, St Margaret's, St Mary's, St Nicholas, Slade, and Winn's Common.

1974–1983: The London Borough of Greenwich wards of Abbey Wood, Eynsham, St Margaret's, St Mary's, St Nicholas, Slade, and Woolwich.

== Members of Parliament ==
Election	Member	Party
1918	Will Crooks	Labour
1921 by-election	Robert Gee	Conservative
1922	Harry Snell	Labour
1931 by-election	George Hicks	Labour
1950	Ernest Bevin	Labour
1951 by-election	Christopher Mayhew	Labour
1974	Christopher Mayhew	Liberal
Oct 1974	John Cartwright	Labour
1981	John Cartwright	SDP

== Election results ==
=== Elections in the 1910s ===
General election 1918: Woolwich, East
Party	Candidate	Votes	%	±%
Labour	Will Crooks	Unopposed		
Labour win (new seat)				

=== Elections in the 1920s ===
1921 Woolwich East by-election
Party		Candidate	Votes	%	±%
C	Unionist	Robert Gee	13,724	51.3	New
	Labour	Ramsay MacDonald	13,081	48.7	N/A
Majority			683	2.6	N/A
Turnout			26,805	78.5	N/A
	Unionist gain from Labour		Swing	N/A	
C indicates candidate endorsed by the coalition government.

General election 1922: Woolwich, East
Party	Candidate	Votes	%	±%
Labour	Harry Snell	15,620	57.1	N/A
Unionist	Robert Gee	11,714	42.9	N/A
Majority		3,906	14.2	N/A
Turnout		27,334	80.4	+1.9
Labour hold		Swing		

General election 1923: Woolwich East
Party	Candidate	Votes	%	±%
Labour	Harry Snell	15,766	61.6	+4.5
Unionist	Ernest Taylor	9,389	38.4	−4.5
Majority		5,927	23.2	+9.0
Turnout		25,155	74.4	−6.0
Labour hold		Swing	+4.5	

General election 1924: Woolwich East
Party	Candidate	Votes	%	±%
Labour	Harry Snell	16,660	58.4	−3.2
Unionist	D.A. Gooch	11,862	41.6	+3.2
Majority		4,798	16.8	−6.4
Turnout		28,522	81.6	+7.2
Labour hold		Swing		

General election 1929: Woolwich East
Party	Candidate	Votes	%	±%
Labour	Harry Snell	20,447	63.2	+4.8
Unionist	Edward Shrapnell-Smith	11,906	36.8	−4.8
Majority		8,541	26.4	+9.6
Turnout		32,353	75.6	−6.0
Labour hold		Swing	+4.8	

=== Elections in the 1930s ===
1931 Woolwich East by-election
Party	Candidate	Votes	%	±%
Labour	George Hicks	16,200	56.7	−6.5
Conservative	Edward Shrapnell-Smith	12,357	43.3	+6.5
Majority		3,843	13.4	−13.0
Turnout		28,557	66.6	−9.0
Labour hold		Swing		

General election 1931: Woolwich, East
Party	Candidate	Votes	%	±%
Labour	George Hicks	16,658	50.9	−12.3
Conservative	John Francis Finn	16,050	49.1	+12.3
Majority		608	1.8	−24.6
Turnout		32,708	76.3	+0.7
Labour hold		Swing		

General election 1935: Woolwich, East
Party	Candidate	Votes	%	±%
Labour	George Hicks	17,563	58.0	+7.1
Conservative	John Francis Finn	12,721	42.0	−7.1
Majority		4,842	16.0	+14.2
Turnout		30,284	71.3	−5.0
Labour hold		Swing		

=== Elections in the 1940s ===
General election 1945: Woolwich, East
Party	Candidate	Votes	%	±%
Labour	George Hicks	18,983	70.4	+12.4
Conservative	Reginald Bennett	7,237	27.0	−15.0
Independent	Hugh Harold Wright	571	2.1	New
Majority		11,746	43.4	+27.4
Turnout		26,791	72.7	+1.4
Labour hold		Swing		

=== Elections in the 1950s ===
General election 1950: Woolwich East
Party	Candidate	Votes	%	±%
Labour	Ernest Bevin	26,604	61.59	−8.8
Conservative	J.D. Campbell	14,234	32.95	+5.9
Liberal	Arthur Maxwell Sage	1,504	3.48	New
Communist	R. Palme Dutt	601	1.39	New
Independent	F. Hancock	252	0.58	New
Majority		12,370	28.64	−15.3
Turnout		43,195	83.31	+5.6
Registered electors		51,849		
Labour hold		Swing	-7.4	

1951 Woolwich East by-election
Party	Candidate	Votes	%	±%
Labour	Christopher Mayhew	20,801	60.73	−0.86
Conservative	Richard Jon Stanley Harvey	13,449	39.27	+6.32
Majority		7,352	21.46	−7.18
Turnout		34,250		
Labour hold		Swing	-3.59	

General election 1951: Woolwich East
Party	Candidate	Votes	%	±%
Labour	Christopher Mayhew	26,982	63.63	+2.04
Conservative	Richard Jon Stanley Harvey	15,420	36.37	+3.42
Majority		11,562	27.26	−1.38
Turnout		42,402	82.05	−1.26
Registered electors		51,679		
Labour hold		Swing	-0.69	

General election 1955: Woolwich East
Party	Candidate	Votes	%	±%
Labour	Christopher Mayhew	23,275	64.29	+0.66
Conservative	Henry C Crawford	12,929	35.71	−0.66
Majority		10,346	28.58	+1.31
Turnout		36,204	73.94	−8.11
Registered electors		48,964		
Labour hold		Swing	+0.66	

General election 1959: Woolwich East
Party	Candidate	Votes	%	±%
Labour	Christopher Mayhew	22,353	63.88	−0.41
Conservative	Edgar J Porter	12,638	36.12	+0.41
Majority		9,715	27.76	−0.82
Turnout		34,991	75.49	+1.55
Registered electors		46,349		
Labour hold		Swing	-0.41	

=== Elections in the 1960s ===
General election 1964: Woolwich East
Party	Candidate	Votes	%	±%
Labour	Christopher Mayhew	22,158	68.26	+4.38
Conservative	David W Clarke	10,303	31.74	−4.38
Majority		11,855	36.52	+8.76
Turnout		32,461	68.98	−6.51
Registered electors		47,061		
Labour hold		Swing	+4.38	

General election 1966: Woolwich East
Party	Candidate	Votes	%	±%
Labour	Christopher Mayhew	22,241	71.66	+3.40
Conservative	Antony W Andrews	8,798	28.34	−3.40
Majority		13,443	43.32	+6.80
Turnout		31,039	67.02	−1.96
Registered electors		46,310		
Labour hold		Swing	+3.40	

=== Elections in the 1970s ===
General election 1970: Woolwich, East
Party	Candidate	Votes	%	±%
Labour	Christopher Mayhew	19,423	65.44	
Conservative	John Cope	10,259	35.56	
Majority		9,164	30.88	
Turnout		29,682	60.66	
Labour hold		Swing		

General election February 1974: Woolwich, East
Party	Candidate	Votes	%	±%
Labour	Christopher Mayhew	20,967	55.89	−9.55
Conservative	Barry Horn Watson	8,990	23.96	−11.60
Liberal	David John Woodhead	6,301	16.80	New
National Front	Philip Sydney Hanman	1,066	2.84	New
Industrial Productivity for British Exports Campaign	John Richard Michael Murphy	191	0.51	New
Majority		11,977	31.93	+1.05
Turnout		37,515	74.22	+13.56
Labour hold		Swing		

General election October 1974: Woolwich, East
Party	Candidate	Votes	%	±%
Labour	John Cartwright	19,812	60.33	+4.44
Conservative	Barry Horn Watson	7,387	22.50	−1.47
Liberal	David John Woodhead	4,638	14.12	−2.67
National Front	Malcolm Eric Leslie Skeggs	1,000	3.05	+0.20
Majority		12,425	37.83	+5.90
Turnout		32,837	64.41	−9.81
Labour hold		Swing	+2.96	

General election 1979: Woolwich, East
Party	Candidate	Votes	%	±%
Labour	John Cartwright	21,700	58.93	−1.40
Conservative	Patrick Rock	11,240	30.53	+8.03
Liberal	David John Woodhead	2,998	8.14	−5.98
National Front	Ian David Steven	884	2.40	−0.65
Majority		10,460	28.40	−9.43
Turnout		36,822	70.11	+5.70
Labour hold		Swing	-4.72	
