= Council for Arab-British Understanding =

Organization centered on British Middle East policy

The Council for Arab-British Understanding (Caabu) is a non-profit organization that is committed to promoting British Middle East policy based on international law, human rights, and civil society. Caabu has been active since its foundation in 1967, serving as an advocate, media and educational platform to shape UK foreign policy and public opinion.

Caabu organizes a range of events and publications aimed at enhancing understanding of the Arab world, with a particular focus on political issues. The organization works with politicians, providing in-depth parliamentary briefings and updates on the Middle East, and also facilitates visits to the region. Caabu arranges various public and private meetings to raise awareness and address important issues in the Arab world.

Caabu is funded through donations and membership fees, and operates as a non-profit organization.

== History ==
Caabu was established in the aftermath of the Six-Day War, as a survey revealed that only 2% of the British public had sufficient knowledge about the Arab world. The organization was founded by a group of academics, journalists, and politicians with the aim of filling the void in British politics and promoting friendly relations with the Arab world. Caabu sought to combat anti-Arab racism and Islamophobia by actively engaging with the media to encourage balanced coverage and greater understanding of the region.

== Structure ==
Caabu is a cross-party group with over 650 general and over 100 parliamentary members. It is a non-profit organisation, which relies upon donations and membership fees to carry out its work. Members at Caabu pay an annual fee of £50, granting them voting rights, access to a range of events and publications, and a daily new digest on the region. Caabu acts as secretariat to the All-Party Parliamentary Groups on Palestine, Qatar and Jordan.

=== Executive ===
Caabu is chaired by Rt Hon David Jones MP.

Other members of its executive committee include:

- John Austin, former Labour MP and a founder of the Labour Middle East Committee.
- Dr Maha Azzam, a former associate fellow at Chatham House.
- John McHugo international lawyer and author of A concise history of the Arabs.
- Carolyn Perry, Head of Philanthropy at the MBI Al Jaber Foundation.
- Vyvyan Kinross, PR and communications advisor, management consultant UNOPS.
- Rt Hon Alistair Carmichael MP, Chief Whip for the Liberal Democrat Party as well as the party's spokesperson on Northern Ireland.
- Andy Love, former Labour and Co-operative Party MP for Edmonton.

=== Director ===
Middle East expert Chris Doyle has been the director of Caabu since 2002. Doyle has spoken at national and international conferences, at Chatham House, RUSI, the Dubai Press Club, the Al Arabiya Forum and the annual Doha Forum on Free Trade and Democratisation in Qatar. In 2003 he observed the elections to the Kuwait National Assembly and in January 2013, he appeared as an expert witness in front of the Foreign Affairs Select Committee in Parliament discussing UK relations with Arab states in the Persian Gulf region.

Doyle was Visiting Lecturer at St Mary's College, University of Surrey, former Chair of Friends of Birzeit University, former trustee of Medical Aid for Palestinians and the Coordinator of the Joint Committee for Palestine.

In 2001 Doyle received a Special Tribute award from the Arab Screen Independent Film Festival for his work with the media.

Doyle was awarded the Annemarie Schimmel award for Championing a Muslim Cause at The Muslim News Awards for Excellence 2015.

== Activities ==
The organization carries out a range of activities including, advocacy, events, media and education.

=== Advocacy ===
Caabu works to improve Arab-British relations in Parliament with ministers, senior civil servants, MPs and Lords from across the political spectrum. It raises key issues with leading politicians and civil servants, including democratic reform in the Middle East and North Africa, the arms trade, Universal Jurisdiction, the siege of Gaza and settlements.

Caabu also writes reports and briefings on critical issues affecting the Arab world for politicians and the general public

=== Delegations ===
Caabu takes delegations of politicians out to the Middle East, to give them a better understanding of the region and its key issues. Between 1997 and 2017 Caabu has taken over 60 delegations to a variety of Arab countries, including Lebanon, Syria, Jordan, Qatar, Saudi Arabia, Yemen, Egypt and Libya, involving over 200 MPs and Lords. The majority of Caabu's delegations visit Gaza and the West Bank, where delegates meet both Palestinian and Israeli officials, activists and businessmen.

Since the General Election on 8 June 2017, Caabu has taken two parliamentary delegations to the West Bank. The delegations have included former Labour Minister for Education and Minister for the Arts, Baroness Tessa Blackstone, Labour's Shadow Minister for Early Years, Tracy Brabin, and former Secretary of State for Scotland, former Government Deputy Chief Whip and Liberal Democrat MP for Orkney and Shetland, Alistair Carmichael.

=== Events ===
Caabu runs a programme of private and public events. The organisation hosts expert speakers at the House of Commons, party conferences, the Arab-British Chamber of Commerce and universities. Caabu also organises round-table seminars for journalists, academics and NGO workers at the Arab British Centre. In the past Caabu has organised a speaking tour to the UK for Tawakkul Karman, the Yemeni co-winner of the Novel Peace Prize, and contributed to the 2013 conference Supporting Open Economies, Inclusive Growth – Women's Role in Arab Countries, as part of the G8 Deauville Partnership with Arab Countries in Transition.

=== Media ===
Caabu monitors the British media for misrepresentations of the Arab world for the purpose of objective reporting. A daily digest of news coverage on the Middle East in the major broadsheets is sent to members of the organisation. Caabu also provides expert comment for television, radio and print on issues affecting the Middle East. Director Chris Doyle gave conducted over 200 interviews on the Arab world in the since 2012.

=== Education ===
Caabu runs an education programme that reaches out to 5–10,000 school children every year. The education programme was designed to give UK school children the opportunity to learn about the Arab world. It works to improve understanding of the history and culture of the Middle East and counter negative and misleading images. Topics included a genrrla introduction to the Arab World, its people and culture; the Israel-Palestine conflict; the Arab Uprisings, Arab stereotypes and perceptions of Muslims in the UK. Caabu continues to give educational talks for schools upon request.

=== Syria programme ===
Caabu launched a Syria programme in 2011, working to highlight events in Syria and raise issues on human rights, international law and the humanitarian situation. Caabu has also run seven workshops inside Syria with civil society activists focusing on citizenship, leadership and media training.

== Publications ==
Caabu produces reports both independently and in conjunction with other organisations.

Trading Away Peace: How Europe helps sustain illegal Israeli settlements (Autumn 2012) The report was produced by 22 non-governmental organisations including Caabu, Christian Aid UK and Ireland, the International Federation for Human Rights (FIDH) and Diakonia revealed today. The report found that EU imports 15 times more from illegal Israeli settlements than from Palestinians.

Palestinian Detainees: no security in injustice (Autumn 2012) The report Palestinian Detainees: no security in injustice was produced by Caabu in September 2012. It shows the lack of due process and human rights abuses in both Israeli and Palestinian jails. The report includes research and analysis on aspects of the detainee's experience, including ill-treatment, arrest without charge and child detention.

Britain and Palestine: A Parliamentary focus (Autumn 2011)

Under Occupation: A report on the West Bank (Spring 2011)

The world's largest prison camp: A report on access to Gaza (Autumn 2010)

One year on from War: A report on the humanitarian and political situation in Gaza (Spring 2010)

== YouGov poll on British attitudes toward the Arab World ==
On 25 September 2018, Caabu hosted a press launch to mark the findings of the new YouGov poll on UK attitudes to the Arab World, conducted in conjunction with Caabu and Arab News. The event featured a panel discussion with Caabu Director, Chris Doyle, Arab News Editor-in-Chief, Faisal Abbas and Director of YouGov's political and social opinion, Anthony Wells. The discussion was moderated by Arab News London Bureau Chief, Ben Flanagan.

The poll also revealed that there is a clear lack of knowledge about the Arab world, with 81 percent admitting to knowing little or nothing about the Arab world. On UK foreign policy in the region 57% of Brits believe it to be ineffective. 83% oppose the 2003 Iraq war itself, which appears to be the highest level detected in polls, and little over 50% support UK airstrikes against ISIS in Syria and Iraq, pointing to a rising sentiment against military interventions.

== Awards ==
In 2010 Caabu won the Takreem Award for 'Exceptional International Contribution to Arab Society' which was received in Beirut, in recognition of the organization's efforts and success over the previous four decades.
