= Woolwich West (London County Council constituency) =

London County Council constituency

- Former constituency for the London County Council

Former constituency
- Created: 1919
- Abolished: 1965
- Member(s): 2 (to 1949); 3 (from 1949)
- Created from: Woolwich

Woolwich West was a constituency used for elections to the London County Council between 1919 and the council's abolition, in 1965. The seat shared boundaries with the UK Parliament constituency of the same name.

== Councillors ==
Year	Name	Party	Name	Party	Name	Party
1919	William James Squires	Municipal Reform	Percy Reginald Simner	Municipal Reform	Two seats until 1949	
1922	Sidney Herbert Cuff	Municipal Reform	Ernest Henry Kemp	Municipal Reform	Two seats until 1949	
1925	Frederick Thomas Halse	Municipal Reform	Ernest Henry Kemp	Municipal Reform	Two seats until 1949	
1934	Samuel McClements	Labour	Ethel Newman	Labour	Two seats until 1949	
1937	Francis Beech	Municipal Reform	James Harry Millar	Municipal Reform	Two seats until 1949	
1945	Francis Beech	Municipal Reform	Stanley Charles Camps Harris	Municipal Reform	Two seats until 1949	
1946	Edwin Thomas Lamerton	Labour	Ethel Newman	Labour	Two seats until 1949	
1949	Francis Beech	Conservative	Unity Lister	Conservative	William Steward	Conservative
1952	Francis Beech	Conservative	Daisy Maud Munns	Labour	Charles Salter	Labour
1955	Unity Lister	Conservative	Leslie Smith	Conservative	Brian Warren	Conservative
1958	Constance Cole	Labour	Mair Garside	Labour	Gavin Henderson	Labour
1961	Unity Lister	Conservative	Evelyn Middleton	Conservative	George Wayman	Conservative

== Election results ==
1919 London County Council election: Woolwich West
Party	Candidate	Votes	%	±%
Municipal Reform	William James Squires	4,269	28.1	
Municipal Reform	Percy Reginald Simner	4,104	27.0	
Labour	Charles H. Langham	3,461	22.8	
Labour	Angus Macdonald Tynemouth	5,845	22.1	
Majority		643	4.2	
Municipal Reform hold		Swing		
Municipal Reform hold		Swing		

1922 London County Council election: Woolwich West
Party	Candidate	Votes	%	±%
Municipal Reform	Sidney Cuff	8,654	29.9	+1.8
Municipal Reform	Ernest Henry Kemp	8,573	29.6	+2.6
Labour	J. F. Matthews	5,907	20.4	−2.4
Labour	H. A. Hart	5,845	20.2	−1.9
Majority				
Municipal Reform hold		Swing		
Municipal Reform hold		Swing		

1925 London County Council election: Woolwich West
Party	Candidate	Votes	%	±%
Municipal Reform	Ernest Henry Kemp	7,888		
Municipal Reform	Frederick Thomas Halse	7,872		
Labour	Henry Berry	5,324		
Labour	J. D. Lawrence	5,198		
Majority				
Municipal Reform hold		Swing		
Municipal Reform hold		Swing		

1928 London County Council election: Woolwich West
Party	Candidate	Votes	%	±%
Municipal Reform	Ernest Henry Kemp	7,797		
Municipal Reform	Frederick Thomas Halse	7,753		
Labour	J. D. Lawrence	6,140		
Labour	Reginald H. Pott	6,076		
Majority				
Municipal Reform hold		Swing		
Municipal Reform hold		Swing		

1931 London County Council election: Woolwich West
Party	Candidate	Votes	%	±%
Municipal Reform	Ernest Henry Kemp	8,654		
Municipal Reform	Frederick Thomas Halse	8,649		
Labour	W. T. Cusheon	5,400		
Labour	Ethel Newman	5,346		
Majority				
Municipal Reform hold		Swing		
Municipal Reform hold		Swing		

1934 London County Council election: Woolwich West
Party	Candidate	Votes	%	±%
Labour	Samuel McClements	10,013		
Labour	Ethel Newman	9,867		
Municipal Reform	Frederick Thomas Halse	9,200		
Municipal Reform	Ernest Henry Kemp	9,181		
Majority				
Labour gain from Municipal Reform		Swing		
Labour gain from Municipal Reform		Swing		

1937 London County Council election: Woolwich West
Party	Candidate	Votes	%	±%
Municipal Reform	Francis Beech	12,945		
Municipal Reform	James Harry Millar	12,693		
Labour	Samuel McClements	11,563		
Labour	Ethel Newman	11,433		
Majority				
Municipal Reform gain from Labour		Swing		
Municipal Reform gain from Labour		Swing		

1946 London County Council election: Woolwich West
Party	Candidate	Votes	%	±%
Labour	Edwin Thomas Lamerton	11,602		
Labour	Ethel Newman	11,529		
Conservative	Stanley Charles Camps Harris	8,261		
Conservative	William Steward	8,162		
Majority				
Labour gain from Conservative		Swing		
Labour gain from Conservative		Swing		

1949 London County Council election: Woolwich West
Party	Candidate	Votes	%	±%
Conservative	Francis Beech	16,628		
Conservative	William Steward	15,993		
Conservative	Unity Lister	15,934		
Labour	H. E. Amos	12,864		
Labour	J. W. Andrews	12,765		
Labour	A. Gorman	12,608		
Conservative win (new seat)				
Conservative gain from Labour		Swing		
Conservative gain from Labour		Swing		

1952 London County Council election: Woolwich West
Party	Candidate	Votes	%	±%
Labour	Charles Salter	15,784		
Labour	Daisy Munns	15,741		
Conservative	Francis Beech	15,698		
Conservative	Unity Lister	15,489		
Labour	W. O. Stein	15,473		
Conservative	O. H. Furlong	15,438		
Labour gain from Conservative		Swing		
Labour gain from Conservative		Swing		
Conservative hold		Swing		

1955 London County Council election: Woolwich West
Party	Candidate	Votes	%	±%
Conservative	Unity Lister	15,834		
Conservative	Leslie Smith	15,426		
Conservative	Brian Warren	15,381		
Labour	Daisy Munns	14,099		
Labour	S. L. Collins	13,794		
Labour	Charles Salter	13,859		
Conservative gain from Labour		Swing		
Conservative gain from Labour		Swing		
Conservative hold		Swing		

1958 London County Council election: Woolwich West
Party	Candidate	Votes	%	±%
Labour	Gavin Henderson	13,946		
Labour	Constance Cole	13,810		
Labour	Mair Garside	13,492		
Conservative	J. P. Ellis	12,217		
Conservative	Unity Lister	12,068		
Conservative	G. K. Messervy	11,839		
Labour gain from Conservative		Swing		
Labour gain from Conservative		Swing		
Labour gain from Conservative		Swing		

1961 London County Council election: Woolwich West
Party	Candidate	Votes	%	±%
Conservative	Unity Lister	15,531		
Conservative	Evelyn Middleton	15,215		
Conservative	George Wayman	15,180		
Labour	Gavin Henderson	14,113		
Labour	Mair Garside	14,036		
Labour	Constance Cole	13,887		
Conservative gain from Labour		Swing		
Conservative gain from Labour		Swing		
Conservative gain from Labour		Swing		
