= Woolwich West =

Woolwich West could refer to:

- Woolwich West (UK Parliament constituency)
- Woolwich West (electoral division), Greater London Council
- Woolwich West (London County Council constituency)

== See also ==
- West Woolwich, New Jersey
