= Woolwich East =

Woolwich East could refer to:

- Woolwich East (UK Parliament constituency)
- Woolwich East (electoral division), Greater London Council
- Woolwich East (London County Council constituency)
