= 1975 Woolwich West by-election =

UK by-election

← Oct. 1974	26 June 1975	1979 →

Constituency of Woolwich West
- Turnout: 46.43% (▼27.46%)
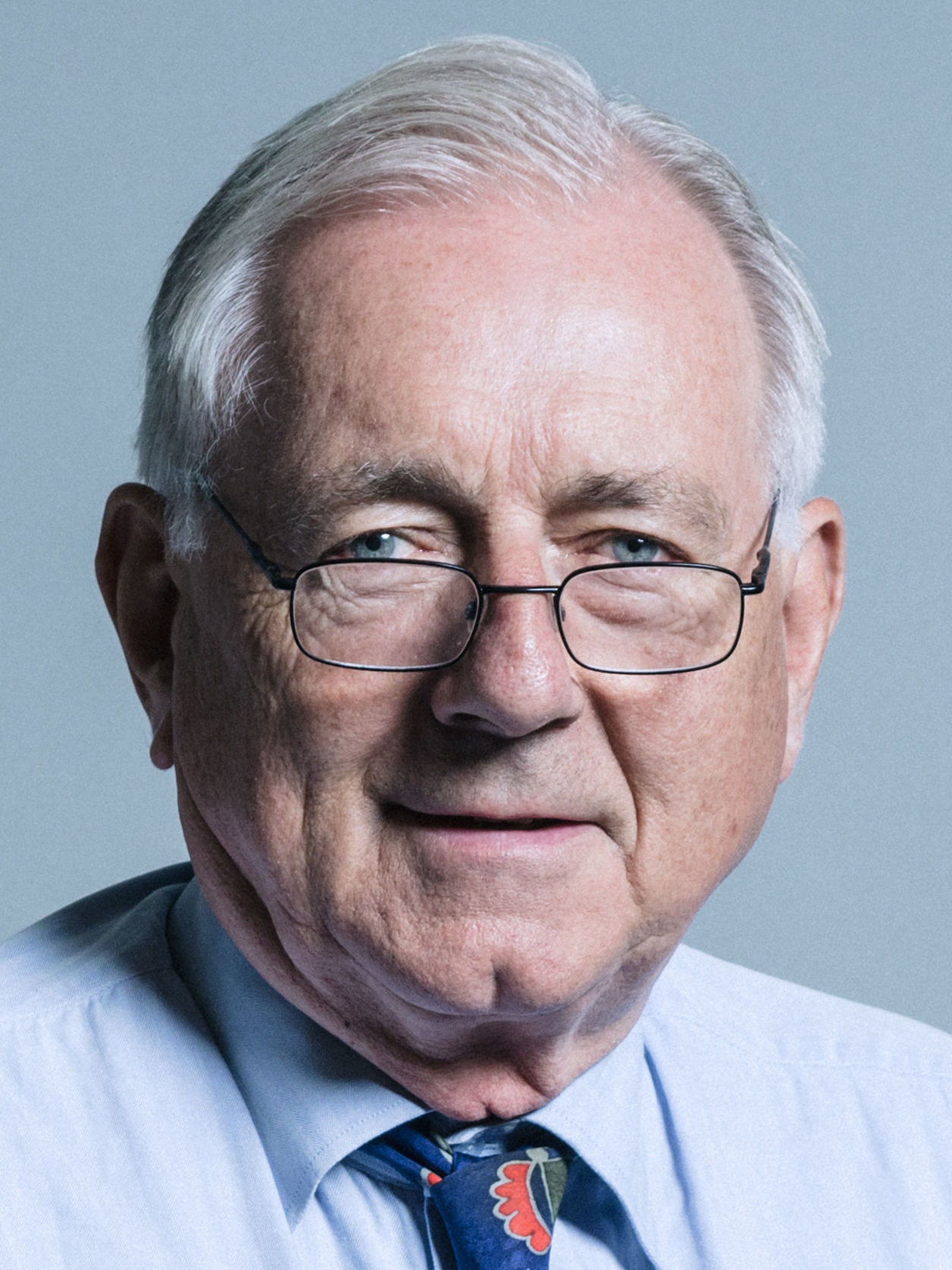
	First party	Second party	Third party
		Lab	Lib
Candidate	Peter Bottomley	Joseph Stanyer	Sheilagh Hobday
Party	Conservative	Labour	Liberal
Popular vote	17,280	14,898	1,884
Percentage	48.78%	42.06%	5.32%
Swing	▲10.19%	▼5.03%	▼8.99%
MP before election
William Hamling
Labour
Elected MP
Peter Bottomley
Conservative

The 1975 Woolwich West by-election was a parliamentary by-election held on 26 June 1975 for the British House of Commons constituency of Woolwich West in South East London.

This was the first by-election since the general election the previous October. The seat had become vacant when the constituency's Labour Member of Parliament (MP), William Hamling, died on 20 March 1975. He had held the seat since winning it from the Conservatives at the 1964 general election. It was to be the only British parliamentary by-election held in 1975.

== Result ==
The result of the contest was a victory for the Conservative candidate, Peter Bottomley, who held the seat until its abolition for the 1983 general election; he had contested the seat in both 1974 general elections. He then sat for Eltham, the successor seat, and from 1997 to 2024 represented Worthing West, formerly a safe Conservative seat in West Sussex.

The result reduced the Labour majority in the House of Commons from three seats to one seat, the Labour total falling from 319 to 318 in a House of 635 members. However, the position of the Labour Government was made worse by the fact that one of its MPs, John Stonehouse, was absent from the country.

This was the first by-election the Conservatives fought under the leadership of Margaret Thatcher, who, by personally canvassing in support of Bottomley, abandoned a convention that party leaders did not campaign in by-elections. Writing in The Glasgow Herald, political correspondent John Warden stated that the victory would boost Thatcher by silencing "mutterings about her leadership" for at least a few months.

Woolwich West by-election, 1975
Party	Candidate	Votes	%	±%
Conservative	Peter Bottomley	17,280	48.78	+10.19
Labour	Joseph Stanyer	14,898	42.06	−5.03
Liberal	Sheilagh Hobday	1,884	5.32	−8.99
National Front	Ruth Robinson	856	2.42	New
Fellowship	Ronald Mallone	218	0.61	New
English National	Frank Hansford-Miller	140	0.39	New
C'tive, Anti-Common Market	Reginald Simmerson	104	0.29	New
Independent	Peter Bishop	41	0.12	New
Majority		2,382	6.72	N/A
Turnout		35,421	46.43	−27.46
Conservative gain from Labour		Swing	+7.61	

== See also ==
- 1943 Woolwich West by-election
- Woolwich West (UK Parliament constituency)
- Woolwich
- List of United Kingdom by-elections
