= Woolwich East (London County Council constituency) =

London County Council constituency

- Former constituency for the London County Council

Former constituency
- Created: 1919
- Abolished: 1965
- Member(s): 2 (to 1949); 3 (from 1949)
- Created from: Woolwich

Woolwich East was a constituency used for elections to the London County Council between 1919 and the council's abolition, in 1965. The seat shared boundaries with the UK Parliament constituency of the same name.

== Councillors ==
Year	Name	Party	Name	Party	Name	Party
1919	Leslie Haden-Guest	Labour	Harry Snell	Labour	Two seats until 1949	
1922	Herbert Morrison	Labour	Harry Snell	Labour	Two seats until 1949	
1925	Herbert Morrison	Labour	William Harold Hutchinson	Labour	Two seats until 1949	
1928	Herbert Morrison	Labour	Henry Berry	Labour	Two seats until 1949	
1931	Reginald H. Pott	Labour	Henry Berry	Labour	Two seats until 1949	
1949	Mabel Crout	Labour	Henry Berry	Labour	Ethel Newman	Labour
1952	Mabel Crout	Labour	Henry Berry	Labour	John William Andrews	Labour
1955	Walter Stein	Labour	James Young	Labour	John William Andrews	Labour

== Election results ==
1919 London County Council election: Woolwich East
Party	Candidate	Votes	%	±%
Labour	Leslie Haden-Guest	7,788	34.1	
Labour	Harry Snell	7,720	33.8	
Municipal Reform	Cyril Jacobs	3,681	16.1	
Municipal Reform	R. Campbell	3,636	15.9	
Majority		4,039	17.7	
Labour hold		Swing		
Labour hold		Swing		

1922 London County Council election: Woolwich East
Party	Candidate	Votes	%	±%
Labour	Herbert Morrison	9,046	28.5	−5.6
Labour	Harry Snell	8,978	28.3	−5.5
Municipal Reform	George Penny	6,764	21.3	+5.2
Municipal Reform	Austin Hudson	6,277	19.8	+3.9
Independent	R. James	366	1.2	n/a
Independent	J. C. Witcher	314	1.0	n/a
Majority		2,214		
Labour hold		Swing		
Labour hold		Swing		

1925 London County Council election: Woolwich East
Party	Candidate	Votes	%	±%
Labour	Herbert Morrison	8,792		
Labour	William Harold Hutchinson	8,746		
Municipal Reform	May Imelda Josephine Pery	5,109		
Municipal Reform	W. T. Cusheon	5,086		
Majority				
Labour hold		Swing		
Labour hold		Swing		

1928 London County Council election: Woolwich East
Party	Candidate	Votes	%	±%
Labour	Herbert Morrison	9,361		
Labour	Henry Berry	9,288		
Municipal Reform	A. W. Goodman	5,280		
Municipal Reform	Ethel Bright Ashford	5,156		
Majority				
Labour hold		Swing		
Labour hold		Swing		

1931 London County Council election: Woolwich East
Party	Candidate	Votes	%	±%
Labour	Henry Berry	7,133		
Labour	Reginald H. Pott	6,994		
Municipal Reform	Francis Beech	5,247		
Municipal Reform	R. Campbell	5,173		
Majority				
Labour hold		Swing		
Labour hold		Swing		

1934 London County Council election: Woolwich East
Party	Candidate	Votes	%	±%
Labour	Henry Berry	9,538		
Labour	Reginald H. Pott	9,443		
Municipal Reform	Francis Beech	5,024		
Municipal Reform	D. Murphy	4,931		
Ind. Labour Party	J. Aplin	328		
Majority				
Labour hold		Swing		
Labour hold		Swing		

1937 London County Council election: Woolwich East
Party	Candidate	Votes	%	±%
Labour	Henry Berry	10,684		
Labour	Reginald H. Pott	10,372		
Municipal Reform	Reginald Bennett	5,358		
Municipal Reform	D. B. Hudson	5,165		
Independent	H. H. Wright	316		
Majority				
Labour hold		Swing		
Labour hold		Swing		

1946 London County Council election: Woolwich East
Party	Candidate	Votes	%	±%
Labour	Henry Berry	unopposed	N/A	N/A
Labour	Reginald H. Pott	unopposed	N/A	N/A
Majority				
Labour hold		Swing	N/A	
Labour hold		Swing	N/A	

1949 London County Council election: Woolwich East
Party	Candidate	Votes	%	±%
Labour	Henry Berry	16,169		
Labour	Ethel Newman	15,369		
Labour	Mabel Crout	15,333		
Conservative	J. Campbell	9,294		
Conservative	M. E. Button	8,906		
Conservative	M. C. R. Hensford	8,832		
Labour win (new seat)				
Labour hold		Swing	N/A	
Labour hold		Swing	N/A	

1952 London County Council election: Woolwich East
Party	Candidate	Votes	%	±%
Labour	Henry Berry	16,943		
Labour	Mabel Crout	16,580		
Labour	John William Andrews	16,122		
Conservative	M. J. Deane	7,255		
Conservative	H. Holloway	6,953		
Conservative	E. Williams	6,953		
Labour hold		Swing		
Labour hold		Swing		
Labour hold		Swing		

1955 London County Council election: Woolwich East
Party	Candidate	Votes	%	±%
Labour	Walter Stein	11,300		
Labour	James Young	11,238		
Labour	John William Andrews	11,219		
Conservative	D. Slade	5,947		
Conservative	A. Pugh	5,844		
Conservative	E. Tribe	5,796		
Labour hold		Swing		
Labour hold		Swing		
Labour hold		Swing		

1958 London County Council election: Woolwich East
Party	Candidate	Votes	%	±%
Labour	Walter Stein	11,023		
Labour	James Young	10,864		
Labour	John William Andrews	10,466		
Conservative	S. G. Turner	3,593		
Conservative	L. H. F. Bliss	3,201		
Conservative	D. E. Bush	3,100		
Independent	S. Burke	354		
Independent	D. Bradfield	264		
Independent	P. E. Gooch	202		
Independent	A. W. Pugh	188		
Independent	J. Hattigan	128		
Labour hold		Swing		
Labour hold		Swing		
Labour hold		Swing		

1961 London County Council election: Woolwich East
Party	Candidate	Votes	%	±%
Labour	Walter Stein	11,834		
Labour	James Young	11,681		
Labour	John William Andrews	11,664		
Conservative	D. Healy	4,953		
Conservative	B. Anthon	4,918		
Conservative	N. Hughes-Narborough	4,550		
Independent	H. H. Wright	1,398		
Labour hold		Swing		
Labour hold		Swing		
Labour hold		Swing		
