= Peter Doig (disambiguation) =

Peter Doig (born 1959) is a Scottish painter.

Peter Doig may also refer to:

- Peter Doig (trade unionist) (1882–1952), Scottish trade union leader
- Peter Doig (politician) (1911–1996), British politician
