= Greenwich (electoral division) =

Electoral division in Greater London, 1965–1986

Greenwich was an electoral division for the purposes of elections to the Greater London Council. The constituency elected three councillors for a three-year term in 1964, 1967 and 1970.

The constituency was revised in 1973 and then elected one councillor for a four-year term in 1973, 1977 and 1981, with the final term extended for an extra year ahead of the abolition of the Greater London Council.

== History ==
It was planned to use the same boundaries as the Westminster Parliament constituencies for election of councillors to the Greater London Council (GLC), as had been the practice for elections to the predecessor London County Council, but those that existed in 1965 crossed the Greater London boundary. Until new constituencies could be settled, the 32 London boroughs were used as electoral areas which therefore created a constituency called Greenwich.

The new constituencies were settled following the Second Periodic Review of Westminster constituencies and the electoral division was replaced from 1973 by the single-member electoral divisions of Greenwich, Woolwich East and Woolwich West. The new Greenwich electoral division matched the boundaries of the Greenwich parliamentary constituency.

== First series ==
Greenwich
- Former electoral division for the Greater London Council
- Greenwich electoral division boundaries from 1965 to 1973
- District: London Borough of Greenwich
- Population: 228,030 (1969 estimate)
- Electorate: 155,361 (1964); 153,327 (1967); 161,288 (1970)
- Area: 11,723.7 acres (47.444 km^{2})

Former electoral division
- Created: 1965
- Abolished: 1973
- Member: 3
- Replaced by: Greenwich, Woolwich East and Woolwich West

The Greenwich constituency was used for the Greater London Council elections in 1964, 1967 and 1970. Three councillors were elected at each election using first-past-the-post voting.

=== 1964 election ===
The first election was held on 9 April 1964, a year before the council came into its powers. The electorate was 155,361 and three Labour Party councillors were elected. With 73,727 people voting, the turnout was 47.5%. The councillors were elected for a three-year term.

1964 Greater London Council election: Greenwich
Party	Candidate	Votes	%	±%
Labour	Julia Ada Johnson	44,714		
Labour	John William Andrews	44,349		
Labour	James Young	42,621		
Conservative	U. V. Lister	25,358		
Conservative	W. S. Manners	25,104		
Conservative	L. J. Smith	24,851		
Communist	E. Halpin	3,786		
Independent	H. H. Wright	2,016		
Turnout				
Labour win (new seat)				
Labour win (new seat)				
Labour win (new seat)				

=== 1967 election ===
The second election was held on 13 April 1967. The electorate was 153,327. One Labour Party and two Conservative Party councillors were elected. With 65,177 people voting, the turnout was 42.5%. The councillors were elected for a three-year term.

1967 Greater London Council election: Greenwich
Party	Candidate	Votes	%	±%
Labour	Peggy Arline Middleton	30,237		
Conservative	Sheila Mary Bradley	29,677		
Conservative	Charles Henry Miles	29,425		
Conservative	K. J. Johnson	29,295		
Labour	John William Andrews	29,210		
Labour	N. J. Smart	28,901		
Liberal	M. J. Colmer	3,711		
Liberal	M. P. D. Ellman	3,482		
Liberal	C. A. R. Rugman	2,973		
Communist	E. Halpin	2,168		
Independent	C.H. Waghorn	679		
Turnout				
Labour hold		Swing		
Conservative gain from Labour		Swing		
Conservative gain from Labour		Swing		

=== 1967 by-election ===
A by-election was held on 29 June 1967, following the resignation of Sheila Mary Bradley. The electorate was 153,327 and one Labour Party councillor was elected. With 65,177 voting, the turnout was 27.9%

Greenwich by-election, 1967
Party	Candidate	Votes	%	±%
Labour	John William Andrews	21,089		
Conservative	E. R. M. Middleton	19,492		
Liberal	M. J. Colmer	614		
Communist	E. Halpin	596		
Independent	William George Boaks	109		
Independent	C. H. Waghorn	72		
Independent	H. H. Wright	71		
Turnout				
Labour gain from Conservative		Swing		

=== 1970 election ===
The third election was held on 9 April 1970. The electorate was 161,288 and three Labour Party councillors were elected. With 65,065 people voting, the turnout was 40.3%. The councillors were elected for a three-year term.

1970 Greater London Council election: Greenwich
Party	Candidate	Votes	%	±%
Labour	Peggy Arline Middleton	35,440		
Labour	John William Andrews	35,438		
Labour	Mair Eluned Garside	34,503		
Conservative	D. H. P. Bridgehouse	25,699		
Conservative	W. Mitchell	25,469		
Conservative	P. S. A. Polkinhorne	24,809		
Liberal	M. J. Colmer	1,473		
Homes before Roads	C. N. Hamilton	1,462		
Liberal	J. R. Hassall	1,418		
Liberal	M. A. Harris	1,415		
Communist	J. Brookshaw	1,287		
Homes before Roads	D. H. Adams	1,257		
Homes before Roads	B. Platts	1,128		
Union Movement	M. P. Winn	1,128		
Turnout				
Labour hold		Swing		
Labour hold		Swing		
Labour gain from Conservative		Swing		

== Second series ==
Greenwich
- Former electoral division for the Greater London Council
- Greenwich electoral division boundaries from 1973 to 1986
- District: Greenwich
- Electorate: 52,423 (1973); 52,893 (1974); 52,402 (1977); 51,706 (1981)
- Area: 1,420 hectares (14.2 km^{2})

Former electoral division
- Created: 1973
- Abolished: 1986
- Member: 1
- Created from: Greenwich

The Greenwich constituency was used for the Greater London Council elections in 1973, 1977 and 1981. One councillor was elected at each election using first-past-the-post voting.

=== 1973 election ===
The fourth election to the GLC (and first using revised boundaries) was held on 12 April 1973. The electorate was 52,423 and one Labour Party councillor was elected. The turnout was 38.9%. The councillor was elected for a three-year term. This was extended for an extra year in 1976 when the electoral cycle was switched to four-yearly.

1973 Greater London Council election: Greenwich
Party	Candidate	Votes	%	±%
Labour	Peggy Arline Middleton	13,953	68.42	
Conservative	J. A. B. Kind	6,440	31.58	
Turnout				
Labour win (new boundaries)				

=== 1974 by-election ===
A by-election was held on 24 October 1974, following the death of Peggy Arline Middleton. The electorate was 52,893 and one Labour Party councillor was elected. The turnout was 22.4%.

Greenwich by-election, 1974
Party	Candidate	Votes	%	±%
Labour	Frederick William Styles	7,495	63.24	
Conservative	N. J. Bennett	3,199	27.00	
Liberal	A. J. W. Renouf	852	7.19	
Fellowship	R. S. Mallone	305	2.57	
Turnout				
Labour hold		Swing		

=== 1977 election ===
The fifth election to the GLC (and second using revised boundaries) was held on 5 May 1977. The electorate was 52,402 and one Labour Party councillor was elected. The turnout was 42.0%. The councillor was elected for a four-year term.

1977 Greater London Council election: Greenwich
Party	Candidate	Votes	%	±%
Labour	Frederick William Styles	9,949	45.19	
Conservative	A. R. Milne	9,356	42.49	
National Front	B. Smoker	1,043	4.74	
Liberal	A. J. W. Renouf	865	3.93	
Fellowship	R. S. Mallone	552	2.51	
National Party	D. McCalden	252	1.14	
Turnout				
Labour hold		Swing		

=== 1981 election ===
The sixth and final election to the GLC (and third using revised boundaries) was held on 7 May 1981. The electorate was 51,706 and one Labour Party councillor was elected. The turnout was 44.0%. The councillor was elected for a four-year term, extended by an extra year by the Local Government (Interim Provisions) Act 1984, ahead of the abolition of the council.

1981 Greater London Council election: Greenwich
Party	Candidate	Votes	%	±%
Labour	Deirdre Frances Mary Wood	12,857	56.54	
Conservative	Peter J. Bassett	6,571	28.90	
Liberal	A. J. W. Renouf	2,001	8.80	
Fellowship	R. S. Mallone	637	2.80	
National Front	L. Bristo	319	1.40	
NNF	J. R. Dunster	225	0.99	
Independent	P. Hansford-Miller	129	0,57	
Turnout				
Labour hold		Swing		
