= Woolwich (London County Council constituency) =

U.K electoral district

- Former constituency for the London County Council

Former constituency
- Created: 1889
- Abolished: 1919
- Member(s): 2
- Replaced by: Woolwich East and Woolwich West

Woolwich was a constituency used for elections to the London County Council between 1889 and 1919. The seat shared boundaries with the UK Parliament constituency of the same name.

== Councillors ==
Year	Name	Party	Name	Party
1889	Edwin Hughes	Moderate	James Alexander Rentoul	Moderate
1892	Edwin Hughes	Moderate	John Robert Jolly	Independent Progressive
1895	Edwin Hughes	Moderate	Abel Penfold	Moderate
1900	William Peel	Moderate	William James Squires	Moderate
1904	Fred Chambers	Labour Progressive	Lewis Jenkin Jones	Labour Progressive
1907	Edward Aubrey Hastings Jay	Municipal Reform	William James Squires	Municipal Reform
1911	Kingsley Wood	Municipal Reform	William James Squires	Municipal Reform

== Election results ==
1889 London County Council election: Woolwich
Party	Candidate	Votes	%	±%
Moderate	Edwin Hughes	5,140		
Moderate	James Alexander Rentoul	3,795		
Progressive	Robert Green	2,430		
Progressive	John Watts	2,417		
Moderate win (new seat)				
Moderate win (new seat)				

1892 London County Council election: Woolwich
Party	Candidate	Votes	%	±%
Moderate	Edwin Hughes	6,079		
Progressive	John Robert Jolly	4,487		
Labour Progressive	Tom Chambers	3,131		
Moderate	William Hicks	1,444		
Moderate hold		Swing		
Progressive gain from Moderate		Swing		

1895 London County Council election: Woolwich
Party	Candidate	Votes	%	±%
Moderate	Edwin Hughes	4,566		
Moderate	Abel Penfold	4,081		
Progressive	R. Williams	3,170		
Moderate hold		Swing		
Moderate gain from Progressive		Swing		

1898 London County Council election: Woolwich
Party	Candidate	Votes	%	±%
Moderate	Edwin Hughes	5,133		
Moderate	Abel Penfold	4,661		
Progressive	Decimus Marsh	4,360		
Progressive	Albert Lindow	4,041		
Moderate hold		Swing		

1901 London County Council election: Woolwich
Party	Candidate	Votes	%	±%
Conservative	William James Squires	3,807	28.4	+0.2
Conservative	William Peel	3,669	27.4	+1.8
Progressive	Decimus Marsh	3,137	23.4	−1.0
Progressive	H. B. D. Woodcock	2,784	20.8	−1.4
Conservative hold		Swing		
Conservative hold		Swing	+1.1	

1904 London County Council election: Woolwich
Party	Candidate	Votes	%	±%
Labour Progressive	Lewis Jenkin Jones	6,982		
Labour Progressive	Fred Chambers	6,669		
Conservative	Edward Aubrey Hastings Jay	4,437		
Conservative	J. M. T. Dumphreys	4,097		
Majority				
Labour Progressive gain from Conservative		Swing		
Labour Progressive gain from Conservative		Swing		

1907 London County Council election: Woolwich
Party	Candidate	Votes	%	±%
Municipal Reform	William James Squires	8,904		
Municipal Reform	Edward Aubrey Hastings Jay	8,677		
Labour Progressive	Lewis Jenkin Jones	7,880		
Labour Progressive	George Lansbury	7,611		
Majority				
Municipal Reform gain from Labour Progressive		Swing		
Municipal Reform gain from Labour Progressive		Swing		

1910 London County Council election: Woolwich
Party	Candidate	Votes	%	±%
Municipal Reform	William James Squires	7,956		
Municipal Reform	Edward Aubrey Hastings Jay	7,736		
Labour	Margaret Bondfield	6,931		
Labour	Jenkin Jones	6,789		
Majority				
Municipal Reform hold		Swing		

1913 London County Council election: Woolwich
Party	Candidate	Votes	%	±%
Municipal Reform	William James Squires	8,378		
Municipal Reform	Kingsley Wood	8,300		
Labour	William Sanders	7,618		
Labour	Margaret Bondfield	7,598		
Majority		682		
Municipal Reform hold		Swing		
Municipal Reform hold		Swing		
