= David Ashby =

British Conservative politician (born 1940)

Member of Parliament for North West Leicestershire
- In office 9 June 1983 – 8 April 1997
- Preceded by: New Constituency
- Succeeded by: David Taylor

Personal details
- Born: David Glynn Ashby; 14 May 1940 (age 85)
- Party: Conservative
- Occupation: Lawyer
- Profession: Politician

David Glynn Ashby (born 14 May 1940) is a British retired lawyer and politician who was the Conservative Member of Parliament for North West Leicestershire from 1983 until he stood down in 1997.

Ashby was both a criminal barrister (1963-2001) and a British politician. His political career spanned over twenty years, starting in 1968 as a local Conservative councillor for Hammersmith, Greater London where he was chairman for Housing and then progressing as a Conservative Councillor for the Greater London Council (GLC) representing Woolwich West from 1977 to 1981. While at the GLC (subsequently dissolved under Margaret Thatcher's government in 1986), he was Chairman of Housing and Management and campaigned fervently for a fairer system of council house distribution by moving power to the boroughs and decentralising.

At the 1983 United Kingdom general election he was elected as a Conservative Member of Parliament for North West Leicestershire, seen at the time as a marginal seat. He was a back-bench MP under both the Margaret Thatcher and John Major governments of the 1980s and 1990s. He was a member of the Home Affairs Committee 17 June 1987 - 21 March 1997, and Consolidation etc. Bills (Joint Committee) 9 June 1983 - 16 March 1992. Ashby was deselected by the North West Leicestershire Constituency Conservative Party in 1996 and Robert Goodwill unsuccessfully contested the seat for the Tories at the 1997 United Kingdom general election.

== Personal life ==
Ashby had an unremarkable parliamentary career, described by The Independent in 1995 as "pedestrian", until January 1994, during the "Back to Basics" campaign. Ashby came under media scrutiny after his wife refused to deny claims put to her by The Sunday Times that during an overseas trip he had shared a hotel bed with another man, "Dr Ciaran Kilduff, 32, his neighbour, at a hotel in France - the Chateau Tilques in Orme - when twin-bedded rooms were available for the same price".

Although Ashby refused to name the other man concerned, he was named as Dr Kilduff by the press and his wife. Ashby later stated that he was seeking legal advice about the newspaper articles that reported his wife as saying that Ashby had left her for another man, attributing his marriage breakdown instead to the long hours in Parliament and to a growing rift between them.

In 1995 Ashby sued The Sunday Times, accusing the newspaper of libelling him in their articles in 1994 exposing his broken marriage and his alleged homosexual affair with Dr Kilduff. In December 1995 Ashby lost the case, which The New York Times described as a "...one of the most bizarre legal cases heard in an English court for years". It went on to report that "Mr. Ashby, who faces a legal bill estimated at $750,000 to cover the cost of the four-week trial, admitted to the court he had shared a bed with other male Members of Parliament more than once but had only done so to save money."

In March 1996 Ashby was deselected by the North West Leicestershire Constituency Conservative Party and his career in politics came to an end.

Parliament of the United Kingdom
New constituency	Member of Parliament for North West Leicestershire; 1983–1997	Succeeded by David Taylor
