= Mair Garside =

London Labour politician

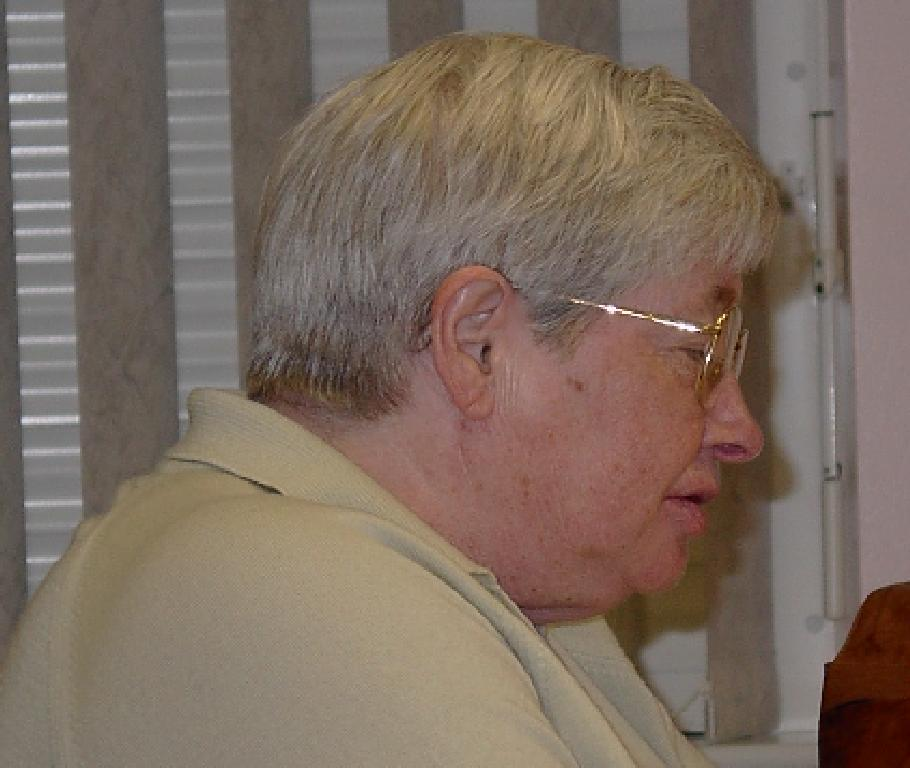

Member of Westminster City Council
- In office 1996–1998

Member of Greater London Council
- In office 1970–1986

Member of London County Council
- In office 1958–1961

Personal details
- Born: 31 August 1931 Cardiff, United Kingdom
- Died: 28 April 2018 (aged 86)
- Party: Labour
- Education: Cardiff University

Mair Eluned Garside (born Mair Eluned Rees, 30 August 1931 – 28 April 2018) was a Labour politician in London for more than 60 years.

She was born in Cardiff in August 1931. She studied at Cardiff University. On 30 July 1954 at Maendy Congregational Chapel, Maindy, Glamorgan, she married Hugh Garside (1928–1993) from Macclesfield, Cheshire; they had met through the National Association of Labour Student Organisations.

They moved to Westminster and lived in Tachbrook Street, Pimlico. She was a friend of John Lanchester's mother, Julia. She represented Woolwich West on the London County Council (1958–1961), and then Greenwich (1970–1973) and Woolwich East (1973–1986) on the Greater London Council. She was Chair of Governors for Waterfield School in Thamesmead and on the Court of Governors of Thames Polytechnic. She became deputy leader (to Ashley Bramall) of the Inner London Education Authority (ILEA) and chairman of the ILEA Development subcommittee. She was awarded Freedom of the London Borough of Greenwich and later of the Royal Borough of Greenwich. She was a member of Westminster City Council from 1996 to 1998 representing Millbank Ward. Bramall was her agent in the election. She was still active as a candidate in the 2014 Westminster City Council election at the age of 83. In 2015 she was chosen by the Daily Mirror to appear on a hustings panel for the Labour leadership election, supporting Yvette Cooper.

Garside was the secretary of the Association for Improvements in the Maternity Services in the 1960s, and active in many local organisations, taking the role of chair of governors at Pimlico School from 2005 to 2007, and as a director of the Peabody Community Foundation from 2000 to 2011.

She was an active member of Llafur: The Welsh People's History Society and helped to establish a London branch.

Garside House in Regency Street, Westminster, is named after the couple and has a plaque which she unveiled in 1994.
