= Unity Lister =

British activist

Dame Unity Viola Lister, DBE (née Webley; 9 June 1913 – 15 December 1998) was a British Conservative political activist. She served on the London County Council from 1949 to 1965 and on its successor the Greater London Council from 1965 to 1983.

== Early life ==
She was born in Woolwich to a doctor father and Quaker mother. She had a facility for foreign languages, and this earned her an important post in the Military Censor's office during the Second World War.

== Post WWII ==
Lister was a long-serving member of the London County Council, representing Woolwich West, and its successor body, the Greater London Council - from 1949 to 1983, and as deputy chairman in 1963–64. She was a passionate Europhile believer in Britain's place at the centre of Europe. She served as a member of the executive of the European Union of Women from 1971, and was a member of the European Movement and the Conservative Group for Europe.

The purpose of the committee was to encourage Tory women to join non-party organisations with charitable purposes and to express the party's view on all matters connected with social welfare. It was the brainchild of Joan Varley, then a senior functionary at Conservative Central Office, who had noted that Labour activists - and Labour views - seemed over-influential in non-political organisations.

Lister helped in the drafting of the Tory response to Barbara Castle's Equal Opportunities Bill and the preparation of the party's argument for entry into the European Economic Community.

In 1940 she married an old school friend, Sam Lister (d. 1995), a mechanical engineer who ran a small family firm of manufacturers. Her husband had a keenly developed interest in local government, and became a Woolwich councillor. When it was suggested that he stand for the London County Council, he demurred, and proposed his wife instead. She was duly elected in 1949 and served as an exceptionally effective deputy chairman between 1963 and 1964.

She had risen through the voluntary ranks of her party and, in 1971, was chairman of the National Union of Conservative and Unionist Associations, and thus had the duty of taking the chair at the party conference that year. The job of conference chairman in 1971 was a peculiarly difficult one - the party was riven by doubts about the wisdom of the leadership's policy for entry into the European Economic Community, doubts fueled by the rhetoric of Enoch Powell.

Lister presided over the fervent and turbulent debate on European policy - there were 125 amendments to the substantive motion - with the strict sense of control which marked all her public appearances - the Government's policy was carried by a strong majority.

== Private life ==
In 1940, she married Sam Lister, an old school friend and mechanical engineer who ran a small family manufacturing company.

== Affiliations ==
- London County Council, 1949–65
- Greater London Council, 1965–83
- Chairman, Women's National Advisory Committee, 1966–69
- Chairman, National Union of Conservative and Unionist Associations, 1970–71
