= Woolwich West (electoral division) =

Electoral division in Greater London, 1973–1986

- Former electoral division for the Greater London Council
- Woolwich West electoral division boundaries
- District: Greenwich
- Electorate: 56,355 (1973); 56,253 (1977); 57,674 (1981)
- Area: 1,820 hectares (18.2 km^{2})

Former electoral division
- Created: 1973
- Abolished: 1986
- Member: 1
- Created from: Greenwich

Woolwich West was an electoral division for the purposes of elections to the Greater London Council. The constituency elected one councillor for a four-year term in 1973, 1977 and 1981, with the final term extended for an extra year ahead of the abolition of the Greater London Council.

== History ==
It was planned to use the same boundaries as the Westminster Parliament constituencies for election of councillors to the Greater London Council (GLC), as had been the practice for elections to the predecessor London County Council, but those that existed in 1965 crossed the Greater London boundary. Until new constituencies could be settled, the 32 London boroughs were used as electoral areas. The London Borough of Greenwich formed the Greenwich electoral division. This was used for the Greater London Council elections in 1964, 1967 and 1970.

The new constituencies were settled following the Second Periodic Review of Westminster constituencies and the new electoral division matched the boundaries of the Woolwich West parliamentary constituency.

It covered an area of 1,820 hectares (18.2 km^{2}).

== Elections ==
The Woolwich West constituency was used for the Greater London Council elections in 1973, 1977 and 1981. One councillor was elected at each election using first-past-the-post voting.

=== 1973 election ===
The fourth election to the GLC (and first using revised boundaries) was held on 12 April 1973. The electorate was 56,355 and one Labour Party councillor was elected. The turnout was 45.7%. The councillor was elected for a three-year term. This was extended for an extra year in 1976 when the electoral cycle was switched to four-yearly.

1973 Greater London Council election: Woolwich West
Party	Candidate	Votes	%	±%
Labour	Margaret Rees	13,466	52.32	
Conservative	W. Mitchell	9,867	38.33	
Liberal	J. D. Eagle	2,401	9.33	
Turnout				
Labour win (new seat)				

=== 1977 election ===
The fifth election to the GLC (and second using revised boundaries) was held on 5 May 1977. The electorate was 56,253 and one Conservative Party councillor was elected. The turnout was 52.2%. The councillor was elected for a four-year term.

1977 Greater London Council election: Woolwich West
Party	Candidate	Votes	%	±%
Conservative	David Glynn Ashby	15,656	53.28	
Labour	Margaret Rees	11,391	38.77	
Liberal	C. B. Fowl	1,132	3.85	
National Front	J. R. Dunster	1,054	3.59	
National Party	D. Simpson	152	0.52	
Turnout				
Conservative gain from Labour		Swing		

=== 1981 election ===
The sixth and final election to the GLC (and third using revised boundaries) was held on 7 May 1981. The electorate was 57,674 and one Labour Party councillor was elected. The turnout was 51.6%. The councillor was elected for a four-year term, extended by an extra year by the Local Government (Interim Provisions) Act 1984, ahead of the abolition of the council.

1981 Greater London Council election: Woolwich West
Party	Candidate	Votes	%	±%
Labour	Neil Davies	14,431	48.50	
Conservative	David Glynn Ashby	11,522	38.73	
Liberal	Edward J. Randall	3,034	10.20	
Ecology	David R. Daniels	399	1.34	
National Front	William J. Lovell	241	0.81	
NNF	Sidney L. Skeggs	117	0.39	
Turnout				
Labour gain from Conservative		Swing		
