= Clive Efford =

British Labour politician

Clive Efford MP
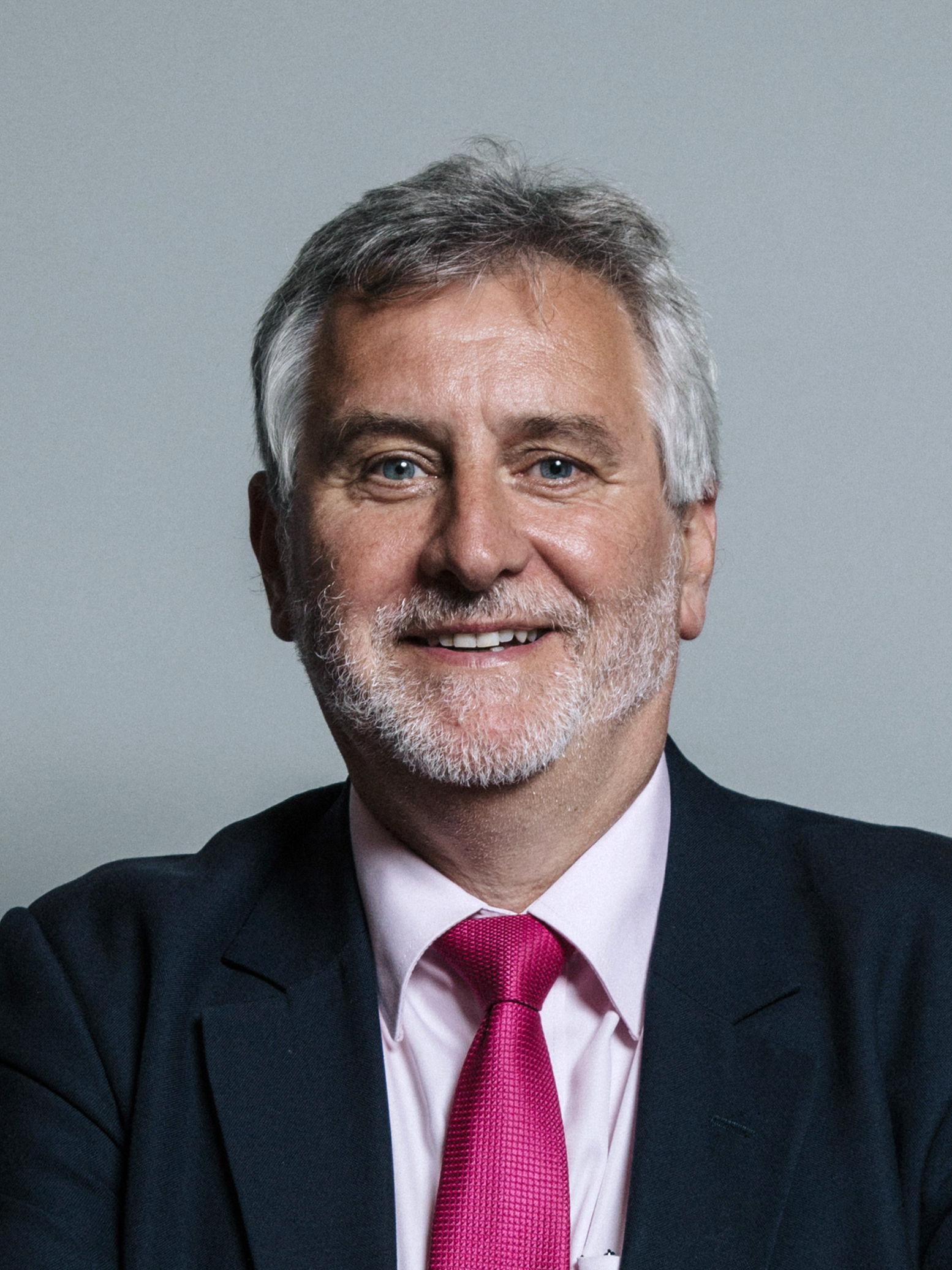
- Official portrait, 2017

Shadow Minister for Sport
- In office 8 October 2011 – 28 June 2016
- Leader: Ed Miliband; Jeremy Corbyn
- Preceded by: Ian Austin
- Succeeded by: Rosena Allin-Khan

Shadow Home Office Minister
- In office 26 September 2010 – 5 October 2011
- Leader: Ed Miliband

Member of Parliament for Eltham and Chislehurst Eltham (1997-2024)
- Incumbent
- Assumed office 1 May 1997
- Preceded by: Peter Bottomley
- Majority: 8,429 (14.5%)

Personal details
- Born: Clive Stanley Efford; 10 July 1958 (age 68) Southwark, London, England
- Party: Labour
- Spouse: Gillian Vallins
- Website: Official website

Clive Stanley Efford (born 10 July 1958) is a British Labour Party politician who has been the Member of Parliament (MP) for Eltham and Chislehurst, previously Eltham, since 1997.

== Early life ==
Efford was born in London and educated at Walworth School and Southwark College. He worked in his family jewellery business, until he completed The Knowledge and qualified as London taxi driver in 1987. In 1986, he became an elected councillor in the London Borough of Greenwich, and continued in both these occupations until being elected to Parliament in 1997.

== Political career ==
Efford was first elected to Greenwich Council in 1986 for the Eltham Well Hall Ward. He was re-elected in 1990 and 1994, becoming the Labour Group Chief Whip in 1990. He did not seek re-election in 1998.

After first contesting the seat of Eltham at the 1992 general election, he successfully won the seat five years later in 1997. He went on to win the seat at the ensuing general elections in 2001, 2005 and 2010, with his majority declining after each until the 2015 general election and increased further in 2017. He retained his seat in the 2024 general election despite boundary changes unfavourable to the Labour Party.

He made his maiden speech in the House of Commons on 25 June 1997.

In Parliament, he has served on a number of Select committees, including being a member of the Transport Select Committee from 2001 to 2008. In 2003, he was one of the Labour MPs who rebelled against the government and voted against UK involvement in the Iraq War. In 2005, Efford was responsible for the reformation of the previously defunct Tribune Group, though unlike its previous incarnation, membership was restricted to backbench Labour MPs. In 2008, he became the parliamentary private secretary to Housing Minister Margaret Beckett, later becoming the PPS to John Healey in the same role from 2009 to 2010.

He was one of the first MPs to declare his support for Ed Miliband, the successful candidate, in the 2010 Labour leadership election. Miliband subsequently appointed him to the Opposition Front Bench in 2011 as a Shadow Home Office Minister under new Shadow Home Secretary Yvette Cooper. In the reshuffle of October 2011, he became the Shadow Minister for Sport.

Clive Efford was one of 36 Labour MPs to nominate Jeremy Corbyn as a candidate in the Labour leadership election of 2015 and he retained his position in Corbyn's shadow cabinet. He resigned from Corbyn's shadow cabinet following a large number of resignations from the Labour front bench on 28 June 2016. He supported Owen Smith in the failed attempt to replace Jeremy Corbyn in the 2016 Labour leadership election.

Efford was shortlisted for the Grassroot Diplomat Initiative Award in 2015 for his work on National Health Service Bill, and he remains in the directory of the Grassroot Diplomat Who's Who publication.

Efford relaunched the Tribune Group of MPs in April 2017, aiming to reconnect with traditional Labour voters while also appealing to the centre ground.

Efford endorsed Keir Starmer in the 2020 Labour leadership election.

In August 2025 Efford was a founder member of Mainstream (political organisation) described as a soft left pressure group within the Labour Party.

Parliament of the United Kingdom
Preceded by Peter Bottomley	Member of Parliament for Eltham; 1997–present	Incumbent
