= Mabel Crout =

British politician

Dame Mabel Crout DBE (6 January 1890 – 8 February 1984) was a British politician, who served on the London County Council.

Born in Plumstead, Crout joined the Labour Party in 1906. She was appointed as assistant secretary to the Woolwich Labour Party in 1912, the first woman to hold a paid post in the local party, and in 1920 she became the first woman to become a magistrate in Woolwich.

In 1919, she was elected to Woolwich Metropolitan Borough Council, also becoming the party's assistant election agent for the borough. She served as Mayor of Woolwich in 1936/37. At the 1949 London County Council election, she was elected for Woolwich East, serving until 1955, when she stood down. She continued on Woolwich Borough Council until 1964, and then was elected as an alderman to its replacement, the London Borough of Greenwich. In 1965, she was made a Dame Commander of the Order of the British Empire. In 1959, she had been made a freeman of Woolwich.

Crout finally retired in 1971, moving to Tunbridge Wells, where she died in 1984 at the age of 94.

Civic offices
Preceded by Henry Berry	Mayor of Woolwich; 1936–1937	Succeeded by Percy Rance
