= David Taylor (North West Leicestershire MP) =

British politician (1946–2009)

- 2005 parliamentary portrait

Member of Parliament for North West Leicestershire
- In office 1 May 1997 – 26 December 2009
- Preceded by: David Ashby
- Succeeded by: Andrew Bridgen

Personal details
- Born: David Leslie Taylor; 22 August 1946 Ashby de la Zouch, Leicestershire, England
- Died: 26 December 2009 (aged 63) Burton upon Trent, Staffordshire, England
- Party: Labour and Co-operative
- Spouse: Pamela Caunt (m. 1969)
- Children: 5
- Education: Leicester Polytechnic; Lanchester Polytechnic; Open University

David Leslie Taylor (22 August 1946 – 26 December 2009) was a British Labour Co-operative politician who served as Member of Parliament (MP) for North West Leicestershire from 1997 until his death in 2009.

== Biography ==
David Taylor was born in Ashby de la Zouch. He went to Heather County Primary School, Ashby Boys' Grammar School and Leicester Polytechnic. He would later obtain further degrees from Lanchester Polytechnic and the Open University.

=== Career ===
At Leicester Polytechnic, he became a Chartered Public Finance Accountant in 1970. At the Open University, he gained a BA in Maths and Computing in 1974. During this time, he wrote the first CASCAID computer program that evolved into the modern-day Kudos and Adult Directions programs. Before being elected as a Member of Parliament, Taylor was an accountant and the computer applications manager for Leicestershire County Council from 1977 to 1997.

He founded Safeguard the Quality of the Rural Environment (SQUARE) and had been a parish councillor, churchwarden of St John the Baptist church in Heather, President of Heather Sparkenhoe Cricket Club, magistrate and school governor.

=== Religion ===
Taylor was a committed Christian and described himself as an ecumenical Anglican.

=== Personal life ===
Taylor married Pamela Caunt on 13 September 1969 in Loughborough. The couple had four daughters (and one son, deceased), one granddaughter and one grandson.

=== Death ===
On Boxing Day 2009, whilst walking with his family at Calke Abbey, Derbyshire, Taylor suffered a massive heart attack. He was taken by ambulance to Queens Hospital in Burton upon Trent, but paramedics were unable to save him. The event occurred during his day off while spending time with his family; he had previously announced that he would not run for re-election due to the high workload.

== Parliamentary career ==
He first contested his seat in 1992, achieving a 5.9% swing compared to the national 3.6% swing to Labour, losing by fewer than 1,000 votes compared with the 8,000 Conservative majority of 1987.

Taylor's views were on the left of the Labour Party. He was widely regarded as one of the parliamentary rebels and had rebelled on 7.2% of votes since June 2001.

Taylor described it as "a real privilege" to win the title of Commons Backbencher of the Year 2007 in the Annual Awards organised by Sky TV and The House Magazine and decided by a ballot of all 646 MPs.

=== Expenses ===
Prior to this, he opened his complete "unredacted" expenses file to the local newspaper, the Leicester Mercury.

Following the new emergency interim rules announced on 19 May 2009 by the Speaker, which say that furniture should no longer be claimed for, Taylor voluntarily elected to apply those new rules retrospectively in his case for the life of the parliament and had since made a refund based on the fully funded purchase price of all such items.

=== Standing down ===
At the May 2008 meeting of his Constituency Labour Party, Taylor announced he would not be standing for re-election at the next general election. Taylor died on 26 December 2009, before the upcoming general election. As a general election was due to be called within four months, no by-election was held. At the 2010 general election, Taylor's former seat was gained by Andrew Bridgen of the Conservative Party.

Parliament of the United Kingdom
Preceded by David Ashby	Member of Parliament for North West Leicestershire; 1997–2009	Succeeded by Andrew Bridgen
