= Colin Turner =

British businessman and politician

Sir Colin William Carstairs Turner CBE DFC (4 January 1922 – 21 March 2014) was a British businessman and Conservative Party politician.

The son of Colin C.W. Turner, he was educated at Highgate School. He had one sister and two half brothers. In 1949 he married Evelyn Mary, daughter of late Claude H. Buckard, Enfield. Together they had three sons and one daughter; 14 grandchildren and 2 great grandchildren. He died in 2014 at the age of 92, at his home in West Runton in Norfolk.

The Colin Turner Group (founded in 1927 by Colin C.W. Turner as the 'Colin Turner London Ltd') International Media Representatives and Marketing Consultants, chairman 1985–1988, president 1988–1997.

== Military service WWII and after ==
He served in World War II with the Royal Air Force, 1940–1945, Air Observer; S Africa and E Africa, 223 Squadron; Desert Air Force, N. Africa, 1942–44; commissioned, 1943; invalided out as flying officer, 1945 after air crash.

He was a member of the Royal Air Forces Association (RAFA): 223 Squadron Association, chairman 1975–93; RAFA Enfield Branch, chairman 1979–93; Sheringham and District Branch, chairman 1994–99, president 2000–09.

== Politics ==
A member of Enfield Borough Council 1956–58.

He contested Enfield (East) Parliament Constituency, 1950 and 1951; Member of Parliament (MP) for Woolwich West from the 1959 general election until his defeat at the 1964 general election. He did not stand again at the 1966 election.

Member of the National Executive of the Conservative Party, 1946–53, 1968–73, 1976–82; Enfield North Conservative Association, chairman 1979–84, president 1984–93; North Norfolk Conservative Association, president 1996–99; Conservative European Constituency Council, London North, chairman 1984–89. Conservative Commonwealth and Overseas Council, deputy chairman 1975, chairman 1976–82; Conservative Foreign and Commonwealth Council, vice-president 1985–2008.

== Media ==
Overseas Press and Media Association, president 1965–67, honorary secretary. 1967, honorary treasurer 1974–82, life president 1982; Overseas Media Guide, editor 1968, 69, 70, 71, 72, 73, 74; Commonwealth Press Union, chairman PR Committee 1970–87;

Old Cholmeleian Society (Highgate School former pupils association), president 1985–86, editor of The Cholmeleian, 1982–95.

== See also ==
- Politics of the United Kingdom

Parliament of the United Kingdom
Preceded by William Steward	Member of Parliament for Woolwich West; 1959–1964	Succeeded by William Hamling
