= North West Leicestershire (constituency) =

UK Parliament constituency (since 1983)

Coordinates: 52.75°N 1.4°W

- County constituency for the House of Commons
- Interactive map of boundaries since 2024
- Location within the East Midlands
- County: Leicestershire
- Electorate: 75,373 (March 2020)
- Major settlements: Coalville, Ashby-de-la-Zouch, Castle Donington

Current constituency
- Created: 1983
- Member of Parliament: Amanda Hack (Labour)
- Seats: One
- Created from: Bosworth and Loughborough

North West Leicestershire is a constituency (Note: A county constituency (for the purposes of election expenses and type of returning officer)) represented in the House of Commons of the UK Parliament since 2024 by Amanda Hack of the Labour Party. It had previously been held by Andrew Bridgen since 2010, as a Conservative from 2010 until 2023, a Reclaim Party member between May and December 2023 and as an independent for the remainder of his term.

== Constituency profile ==
North West Leicestershire is a constituency in Leicestershire in the East Midlands of England, covering most of the local government district of the same name. Its largest town is Coalville, which has a population of around 23,000. Other settlements include the towns of Ashby-de-la-Zouch and Castle Donington and the villages of Whitwick, Hugglescote, Ibstock, Measham, Moira and Kegworth.

Coalville and its nearby villages form part of the Leicestershire and South Derbyshire Coalfield and have a history of coal mining. Ashby-de-la-Zouch is surrounded by coal mining villages but itself has no history of the industry; it is instead a historic small market town known for its ruined castle. Castle Donington lies adjacent to East Midlands Airport, which is a significant local employer. The constituency generally has average levels of wealth; there is some deprivation in Coalville whilst Ashby-de-la-Zouch and Castle Donington are mostly affluent. House prices are similar to the rest of the East Midlands and lower than the UK average.

Residents have a similar age profile to the rest of the country with a marginally higher proportion of over-50s. They have average levels of income, low rates of child poverty and are more likely to be homeowners compared to the rest of the UK. Residents have average levels of education and a high proportion work in the transport and manufacturing sectors. The percentage claiming unemployment benefits is around half the UK-wide rate. White people made up 96% of the population at the 2021 census.

At the local district council, the constituency's towns and larger villages are represented by Labour Party councillors (except Coalville's eastern neighbourhoods which elected Liberal Democrats) whilst the rural areas and small villages voted for Conservatives. At the county council, which held elections more recently, almost all seats in the constituency were won by Reform UK. Voters here strongly supported leaving the European Union in the 2016 referendum; an estimated 61% voted in favour of Brexit compared to the UK-wide figure of 52%.

== History ==
The constituency was contested for the first time in 1983, and Conservative candidate David Ashby became its first MP that year. He stood down in 1997 and Labour's David Taylor won the seat, holding it until he died of a heart attack in December 2009. Taylor had already announced that he would stand down at the 2010 general election. With the next election being due on 6 May 2010, it was considered uneconomic and (based on precedent) unnecessary to arrange a by-election. In the 2010 election, Andrew Bridgen took the seat for the Conservatives, with a swing of 12% from Labour to the Conservatives and with a smaller Labour–Liberal Democrats swing. Bridgen's majority was 7,511 or 14.5% of the total votes cast.

== Boundaries ==
Map of boundaries 1997-2024

=== Historic ===
North West Leicestershire constituency was created in 1983 from parts of the seats of Bosworth to the south and Loughborough to the east.

1983–1997: The District of North West Leicestershire, and the Borough of Charnwood wards of Shepshed East and Shepshed West.

1997–2024: The District of North West Leicestershire.

=== Current ===
Following the 2023 review of Westminster constituencies, which came into effect for the 2024 general election, the size of the constituency was reduced to bring the electorate within the permitted range by transferring the two small wards of Appleby, and Oakthorpe and Donisthorpe to the newly named constituency of Hinckley and Bosworth.

== Members of Parliament ==
Bosworth and Loughborough prior to 1983

Election	Member	Party
1983	David Ashby	Conservative
1997	David Taylor	Labour
2010	Andrew Bridgen	Conservative
Apr 2023	Andrew Bridgen	Independent
May 2023	Andrew Bridgen	Reclaim
Dec 2023	Andrew Bridgen	Independent
2024	Amanda Hack	Labour

== Elections ==
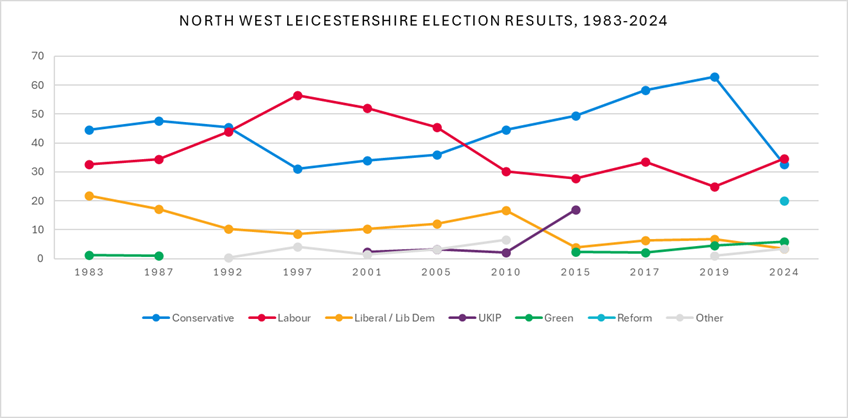
North West Leicestershire election results 1983-2024

=== Elections in the 2020s ===
General election 2024: North West Leicestershire
Party	Candidate	Votes	%	±%
Labour	Amanda Hack	16,871	34.7	+9.3
Conservative	Craig Smith	15,859	32.7	−29.4
Reform	Noel Matthews	9,678	19.9	New
Green	Carl Benfield	2,831	5.8	+1.1
Liberal Democrats	Alice Delemare	1,629	3.4	−3.4
Independent	Andrew Bridgen	1,568	3.2	New
Independent	Siobhan Dillon	136	0.3	New
Majority		1,012	2.0	N/A
Turnout		48,572	63.0	▼4.6
Registered electors		77,757		
Labour gain from Conservative		Swing	▲19.4	

=== Elections in the 2010s ===
General election 2019: North West Leicestershire
Party	Candidate	Votes	%	±%
Conservative	Andrew Bridgen	33,811	62.8	+4.6
Labour	Terri Eynon	13,411	24.9	−8.5
Liberal Democrats	Grahame Hudson	3,614	6.7	+0.3
Green	Carl Benfield	2,478	4.6	+2.5
Independent	Edward Nudd	367	0.7	New
Libertarian	Dan Liddicott	140	0.3	New
Majority		20,400	37.9	+13.1
Turnout		53,821	68.2	−2.8
Conservative hold		Swing	+6.6	

General election 2017: North West Leicestershire
Party	Candidate	Votes	%	±%
Conservative	Andrew Bridgen	31,153	58.2	+8.7
Labour	Sean Sheahan	17,867	33.4	+6.0
Liberal Democrats	Michael Wyatt	3,420	6.4	+2.5
Green	Mia Woolley	1,101	2.1	−0.2
Majority		13,286	24.8	+2.7
Turnout		53,541	71.0	−0.4
Conservative hold		Swing	+1.4	

General election 2015: North West Leicestershire
Party	Candidate	Votes	%	±%
Conservative	Andrew Bridgen	25,505	49.5	+4.9
Labour	Jamie McMahon	14,132	27.4	−2.7
UKIP	Andy McWilliam	8,704	16.9	+14.7
Liberal Democrats	Mark Argent	2,033	3.9	−12.7
Green	Benjamin Gravestock	1,174	2.3	New
Majority		11,373	22.1	+7.6
Turnout		51,548	71.4	−1.5
Conservative hold		Swing	+3.8	

General election 2010: North West Leicestershire
Party	Candidate	Votes	%	±%
Conservative	Andrew Bridgen	23,147	44.6	+8.6
Labour	Ross Willmott	15,636	30.1	−15.4
Liberal Democrats	Paul Reynolds	8,639	16.6	+4.5
BNP	Ian Meller	3,396	6.5	+3.4
UKIP	Martin Green	1,134	2.2	−1.1
Majority		7,511	14.5	N/A
Turnout		51,952	72.9	+6.1
Conservative gain from Labour		Swing	+12.0	

=== Elections in the 2000s ===
General election 2005: North West Leicestershire
Party	Candidate	Votes	%	±%
Labour Co-op	David Taylor	21,449	45.5	−6.6
Conservative	Nicola Le Page	16,972	36.0	+2.1
Liberal Democrats	Roderick Keys	5,682	12.1	+1.8
UKIP	John Blunt	1,563	3.3	+1.0
BNP	Clive Potter	1,474	3.1	New
Majority		4,477	9.5	−8.7
Turnout		47,140	66.8	+1.0
Labour Co-op hold		Swing	−4.4	

General election 2001: North West Leicestershire
Party	Candidate	Votes	%	±%
Labour Co-op	David Taylor	23,431	52.1	−4.3
Conservative	Nick Weston	15,274	33.9	+2.9
Liberal Democrats	Charlie Fraser-Fleming	4,651	10.3	+1.7
UKIP	William Nattrass	1,021	2.3	New
Independent	Robert Nettleton	632	1.4	New
Majority		8,157	18.2	−7.2
Turnout		45,009	65.8	−14.2
Labour Co-op hold		Swing	-3.6	

=== Elections in the 1990s ===
General election 1997: North West Leicestershire
Party	Candidate	Votes	%	±%
Labour Co-op	David Taylor	29,332	56.4	+12.5
Conservative	Robert Goodwill	16,113	31.0	−14.5
Liberal Democrats	Stan Heptinstall	4,492	8.6	−1.6
Referendum	Maurice Abney-Hastings	2,008	4.0	New
Majority		13,219	25.4	N/A
Turnout		51,945	80.0	−6.1
Labour Co-op gain from Conservative		Swing	+13.5	

General election 1992: Leicestershire North West
Party	Candidate	Votes	%	±%
Conservative	David Ashby	28,379	45.5	−2.1
Labour	David Taylor	27,400	43.9	+9.6
Liberal Democrats	Jeremy Beckett	6,353	10.2	−6.9
Natural Law	David Fawcett	229	0.4	New
Majority		979	1.6	−11.7
Turnout		62,361	86.1	+3.3
Conservative hold		Swing	−5.9	

=== Elections in the 1980s ===
General election 1987: Leicestershire North West
Party	Candidate	Votes	%	±%
Conservative	David Ashby	27,872	47.6	+3.0
Labour	Susan Waddington	20,044	34.3	+1.7
Liberal	David Emmerson	10,034	17.1	−4.6
Green	Helen Michetschlager	570	1.0	−0.1
Majority		7,828	13.3	+1.4
Turnout		58,520	82.85	+1.4
Conservative hold		Swing		

General election 1983: Leicestershire North West
Party	Candidate	Votes	%	±%
Conservative	David Ashby	24,760	44.6	
Labour	Mel Read	18,098	32.6	
Liberal	Geoffrey Cort	12,043	21.7	
Ecology	Dinah Freer	637	1.15	
Majority		6,662	12.0	
Turnout		55,538	81.07	
Conservative win (new seat)				

== See also ==
- List of parliamentary constituencies in Leicestershire and Rutland
