= Peter Bottomley =

British politician (born 1944)

Sir Peter Bottomley
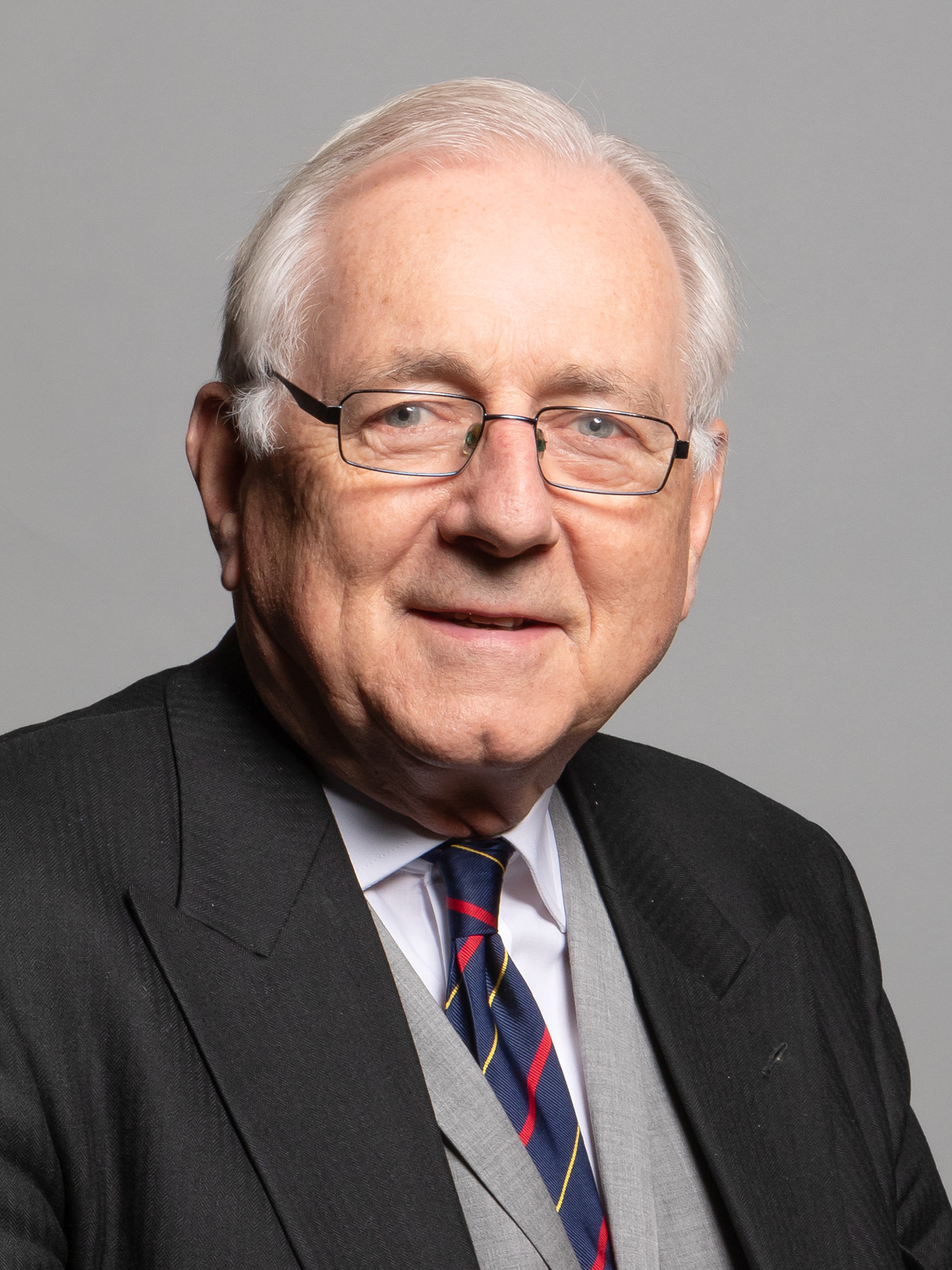
- Official portrait, 2020

Father of the House of Commons
- In office 13 December 2019 – 30 May 2024
- Speaker: Sir Lindsay Hoyle
- Preceded by: Kenneth Clarke
- Succeeded by: Sir Edward Leigh

Parliamentary Under-Secretary of State for Northern Ireland
- In office 4 July 1989 – 28 July 1990
- Prime Minister: Margaret Thatcher
- Preceded by: Peter Viggers
- Succeeded by: The Lord Skelmersdale

Parliamentary Under-Secretary of State for Transport
- In office 23 January 1986 – 24 July 1989
- Prime Minister: Margaret Thatcher
- Preceded by: Michael Spicer
- Succeeded by: Patrick McLoughlin

Parliamentary Under-Secretary of State for Employment
- In office 11 September 1984 – 23 January 1986
- Prime Minister: Margaret Thatcher
- Preceded by: John Gummer
- Succeeded by: David Trippier

Member of Parliament for Worthing West
- In office 1 May 1997 – 30 May 2024
- Preceded by: Constituency created
- Succeeded by: Beccy Cooper

Member of Parliament for Eltham (1983–1997) Woolwich West (1975–1983)
- In office 26 June 1975 – 8 April 1997
- Preceded by: William Hamling
- Succeeded by: Clive Efford

Personal details
- Born: 30 July 1944 (age 82) Newport, Shropshire, England
- Party: Conservative
- Spouse: Virginia Garnett (m. 1967)
- Children: 3
- Parents: Sir James Bottomley (father); Barbara née Vardon (mother)
- Education: Trinity College, Cambridge
- Website: www.sirpeterbottomley.com
- Bottomley's voice from the BBC programme Front Row, 25 April 2013

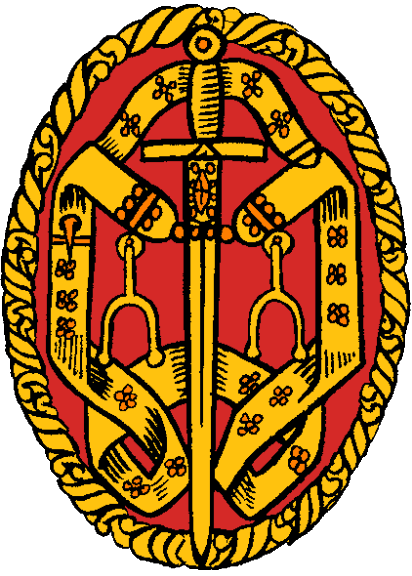
Insignia of a Knight Bachelor

Sir Peter James Bottomley (born 30 July 1944) is a British Conservative Party politician who served as a Member of Parliament (MP) from 1975 until 2024, last representing Worthing West.

First elected at a by-election for the former constituency of Woolwich West, he served as its MP until its abolition at the 1983 general election, and then for Eltham its successor constituency, until 1997. He was then selected to contest Worthing West at the 1997 general election, being returned seven times before losing to Labour's Beccy Cooper at the 2024 general election.

Following the 2019 general election, Bottomley became the longest-serving MP being styled Father of the House for the duration of that parliament. He then became the first Father to be unseated rather than retire or die in post.

== Early life and career ==
Born at Newport, Shropshire, the son of Sir James Bottomley, classical scholar and a wartime Army officer who later joined the Foreign and Commonwealth Office, and Barbara, née Vardon, a social worker, he was baptised at St Swithun's Parish Church, Cheswardine, Shropshire, where his parents married. After seven school changes before the age of 11, he attended junior high school in Washington, D.C., and was then educated at Westminster School before going up to read economics at Trinity College, Cambridge, following his father (Sir James), grandfather (Sir William Bottomley), father-in-law and father-in-law's father in graduating from the college. His supervisor was James Mirrlees, who was later awarded the Nobel Prize for Economics.

Before university, Bottomley worked around Australia, including three weeks teaching at Geelong Grammar School deputising for the explorer and teacher John Béchervaise, and unloading trucks in Melbourne docks. In between, he spent four days walking in Mount Field National Park in a group with Tenzing Norgay. After university, he became a lorry driver and joined the Transport and General Workers Union, before moving on to industrial sales and industrial relations. In the early 1970s, he co-founded the Neighbourhood Council in South Lambeth, resulting in the creation of football pitches and other facilities at Larkhall Park. His last job before entering Parliament was putting lights outside theatres and cinemas in London's West End. Bottomley joined the Conservative Party in 1972, at the age of 28.

== Member of Parliament ==
=== Backbencher ===
Bottomley contested the Vauxhall constituency at the 1973 GLC election and Woolwich West parliamentary seat at the February and October general elections of 1974, failing to defeat the sitting Labour MP William Hamling. Hamling died on 20 March 1975, and in the space of 18 months, Bottomley faced the electors of Woolwich West for a third time at the by-election on 26 June 1975. At this by-election he was elected as MP for Woolwich West with 48.8% of the vote and a majority of 2,382.

From 1978 Bottomley served as the President of the Conservative Trade Unionists for two years, Bottomley becoming a Trustee of Christian Aid in 1978 until 1984. In 1978, as a member of the Parliamentary Human Rights Group, he campaigned to prevent the anticipated assassination of Archbishop Óscar Romero and represented the British Council of Churches at the Saint’s funeral in El Salvador in 1980 when 14 people died around him. In 1979, days before the fall of the Labour Government, he made a visit to Washington, D.C., to indicate that Margaret Thatcher, were she to become Prime Minister, would not lift sanctions on Southern Rhodesia nor recognise the government of Bishop Abel Muzorewa. He was for some years a member of the Conservative Monday Club as well as a member of the Bow Group and Tory Reform Group.

At the 1979 general election, Bottomley was returned as MP for Woolwich West with a decreased vote share of 47.3% and an increased majority of 2,609.

Chairman of the Church of England's Children's Society, a Trustee of Mind and of Nacro and a policy committee member of One Parent Families, Bottomley served with Dr John Sentamu on the successor committee to the Archbishop of Canterbury's commission that produced the report Faith in the City, and chaired the Churches' Review Group on the Churches' Main Committee. He was a member of the Ecclesiastical Committee and served as the Parliamentary Warden of St Margaret's Church, Westminster. He led the United Kingdom delegation to the Parliamentary Assembly of the Organization for Security and Co-operation in Europe (OSCE). He is an Honorary Vice-President of WATCH (Women and the Church), supporting full equal acceptance of females.

In 1982, Bottomley was appointed Parliamentary Private Secretary (PPS) to the Minister of State in the Foreign and Commonwealth Office, Cranley Onslow. At the 1983 general election, Bottomley's constituency of Woolwich West was subject to boundary changes and renamed Eltham; he won the new seat with 47.9% of the vote and a majority of 7,592. Following the election, Peter Bottomley became PPS to the Secretary of State in the Department of Health and Social Security, Norman Fowler.

=== Government minister ===
Bottomley joined Margaret Thatcher's government being appointed as the Parliamentary Under Secretary of State at the Department for Employment (for Industrial relations, Health and Safety, European issues) in 1984, moving sideways to the Department of Transport in 1986 to become the Minister of Roads and Traffic; he opened many news roads as Minister, including the Bulwick A43 Bypass in April 1986. In 1989 he moved sideways again to the Northern Ireland Office (for Environment and Agriculture). He was dropped by Thatcher in 1990, when he briefly became PPS to the Secretary of State for Northern Ireland, Peter Brooke.

At the 1987 general election, Bottomley was re-elected as MP for Eltham with a decreased vote share of 47.5% and a decreased majority of 6,460.

=== Return to the backbenches ===
In 1990 Bottomley returned to the backbenches, being described as a maverick, "supporting a range of seemingly perverse causes".

At the 1992 general election, Bottomley was again re-elected with a decreased vote share of 46% and a decreased majority of 1,666. Bottomley decided not to re-contest Eltham after major boundary changes. He sought nomination elsewhere. At the 1997 general election, Bottomley contested the newly formed constituency of Worthing West, where he was elected with 46.1% of the vote and a majority of 7,713.

Bottomley was re-elected as MP for Worthing West at the 2001 general election with an increased vote share of 47.5% and an increased majority of 9,037. He was again re-elected at the 2005 general election with an increased vote share of 47.6% and an increased majority of 9,379.

In 2009, Bottomley was elected Vice-Chairman of the All-Party Parliamentary Flag Group, and by 2011, he served on more parliamentary groups than any other MP. He was Vice-Chairman of the All-Party United Nations Group as well as of the All-Party Parliamentary Group (APPG) for Transport Safety.

At the 2010 general election, Bottomley was again re-elected with an increased vote share of 51.7% and an increased majority of 11,729. He was again re-elected at the 2015 general election with a decreased vote share of 51.5% and an increased majority of 16,855.

At the 2016 referendum, Bottomley supported the United Kingdom remaining in the European Union.

Bottomley was again re-elected at the snap 2017 general election, with an increased vote share of 55.4% and a decreased majority of 12,090.

An advocate for reducing the voting age to 16, Bottomley was a co-founder and Vice-Chairman of the now defunct Votes at 16 APPG in support of the Votes at 16 campaign.

Bottomley co-chaired the APPG on Haemophilia and Contaminated Blood, campaigning to get justice for those affected by the tainted blood scandal. During a parliamentary debate on 24 November 2016, he urged Prime Minister Theresa May to look at the issue.

Bottomley was again re-elected to parliament at the 2019 general election, with an increased vote share of 55.8% and an increased majority of 14,823.

Introduced to the Commons in 1975, Bottomley succeeded Kenneth Clarke as Father of the House for the 2019–2024 parliament: Clarke retired from the Commons, having served since 1970 before being created a Life Peer in 2020, and the other previously long-serving MP, Dennis Skinner, was not returned to parliament by his constituents at the 2019 general election.

Bottomley lost his seat at the 2024 General Election, ending his 49 year tenure in the House of Commons.

== Personal life ==
In 1967, Bottomley married Virginia Garnett who later became a Cabinet Minister (Health Secretary), then created a Life Peeress in 2005 as Baroness Bottomley of Nettlestone.

His brother, Henry, was a Labour Lambeth councillor; his brother-in-law was Conservative Mayor of Cambridge. His niece is Kitty Ussher, the economist, formerly a Labour MP and Minister. His nephew is HHJ Silas James Reid, known for sentencing climate protestors. His great-grandfather Sir Richard Robinson led the Municipal Reformers to victory in the 1907 London County Council election.

In 1989, Bottomley successfully sued The Mail on Sunday, the Daily Express and News of the World for allegations connected with his support of the union membership of a social worker in his constituency accused of misbehaviour in a children's home. In 1995, he was awarded £40,000 against the Sunday Express for an article which accused him of betraying the paratrooper Private Lee Clegg, who was in jail for the murder of a joyrider in Northern Ireland, by appearing at a meeting with Martin McGuinness.

Bottomley served as Master of the Worshipful Company of Drapers for 2002/03.

In November 2003, he was banned from driving for six months following several speeding offences. The local newspaper organised an electric bike for him.

Sir Peter was knighted in the 2011 New Year Honours for public service.

== Bibliography ==
- Leigh Rayment's Historical List of MPs
- Who's Who 2008, A&C Black

Parliament of the United Kingdom
Preceded by William Hamling	Member of Parliament for Woolwich West; 1975–1983	Constituency abolished
New constituency	Member of Parliament for Eltham; 1983–1997	Succeeded by Clive Efford
New constituency	Member of Parliament for Worthing West; 1997–2024	Succeeded by Beccy Cooper
Honorary titles
Preceded by Kenneth Clarke	Father of the House of Commons; 2019–2024	Succeeded by Sir Edward Leigh
