= William Hamling =

British politician of the Labour Party

William Hamling MP

Parliamentary Private Secretary to the Prime Minister
- In office 1974–1975
- Prime Minister: Harold Wilson
- Preceded by: Timothy Kitson
- Succeeded by: Kenneth Marks

Member of Parliament for Woolwich West
- In office 1964–1975
- Preceded by: Colin William Carstairs Turner
- Succeeded by: Peter Bottomley

Personal details
- Born: William Hamling; 10 August 1912
- Died: 20 March 1975 (aged 62)
- Party: Labour
- Education: University of Liverpool

Military service
- Allegiance: United Kingdom
- Branch/service: British Army
- Years of service: 1939–1945
- Rank: Signals Officer
- Unit: Royal Marines
- Battles/wars: World War II

William Hamling (10 August 1912 – 20 March 1975) was a British Labour Party politician.

Hamling was educated at Liverpool University and was a signals officer in the Royal Marines during World War II.

Hamling contested Southport in 1945, Liverpool Wavertree in 1950 and 1951, Woolwich West in 1955 and 1959, and Torquay at the 1955 by-election, before he was finally elected as member of parliament (MP) for the Woolwich West constituency at the 1964 general election, and held the seat until his death in 1975, aged 62. The resulting Woolwich West by-election was won by the Conservative candidate Peter Bottomley.

Probably the author of A Short History of the Liverpool Trades Council, Liverpool Trades Council and Labour Party, 1948.

A stained-glass window depicting William Blake, dedicated to the memory of Hamling, may be found in St. Mary's Church, Battersea.

Government offices
Preceded by Timothy Kitson	Parliamentary Private Secretary to the Prime Minister; 1974–1975	Succeeded by Kenneth Marks
Parliament of the United Kingdom
Preceded by Colin William Carstairs Turner	Member of Parliament for Woolwich West; 1964–1975	Succeeded by Peter Bottomley
