= James Young (trade unionist) =

Scottish trade unionist and politician

James Young (1 October 1887 – 16 July 1975) was a Scottish trade unionist and politician.

Young grew up in Edinburgh and attended George Heriot's School. He completed an apprenticeship as an engineer and draughtsman with Brown Brothers, working there until 1918, when he relocated to Glasgow. He joined the Association of Engineering and Shipbuilding Draughtsmen (AESD), and served as its full-time assistant general secretary from 1920, also serving on the executive of the Labour Research Department. James Young had 2 sons James Maurice Young (circa 1921-2012) and David Storrie Young (who died in infancy) In 1929, he moved roles, becoming a divisional organiser.

From 1932 until 1945, Young represented the AESD on the executive of the Scottish Trades Union Congress, and he served as its president in 1935/6 and 1944/5. During World War II, he served on the Regional Production Board for Scotland, while in 1944 he was appointed to the Advisory Council of Education for Scotland and elected to the executive of the Confederation of Shipbuilding and Engineering Unions.

In 1945, Young was elected as general secretary of the AESD, and in 1947 he was additionally elected as president of the International Federation of Commercial, Clerical and Technical Employees. He stood down as general secretary of the union in 1952 to focus on his international post, relocating to London.

In London, Young became active in the Labour Party, and he stood successfully for the Woolwich East seat on London County Council in 1955. He held his seat until the council's abolition in 1965, winning the Greenwich seat on its successor, the Greater London Council. During this period, he chaired the education committee, in which role he acted as joint leader of the Inner London Education Authority. He retired in 1967.

Trade union offices
Preceded by Thomas Brown	President of the Scottish Trades Union Congress; 1935–1936	Succeeded by Bell Jobson
Preceded by James Crawford	President of the Scottish Trades Union Congress; 1944–1945	Succeeded by Jim Campbell
Preceded by Peter Doig	General Secretary of the Association of Engineering and Shipbuilding Draughtsmen; 1945–1952	Succeeded by George Doughty
Preceded by Oreste Capocci	President of the International Federation of Commercial, Clerical and Technical Employees; 1947–1955	Succeeded by Friedrich Hillegeist
