= Peter Doig (trade unionist) =

Scottish trade union leader

Peter Doig (5 January 1882 – 13 October 1952) was a Scottish trade union leader.

Born in Glasgow, Doig served his apprenticeship as a draughtsman at John Brown and Company in Clydebank. He emigrated to United States where he found work as a ship designer, but returned to the UK, and worked at Harland & Wolff in Belfast. he then emigrated to Shanghai, and became a chief draughtsman there.

Doig began suffering from poor health, leading to a permanent disability. He returned to the UK during World War I, and worked for William Beardmore and Company in Dalmuir. In 1916, he joined the recently formed Association of Engineering and Shipbuilding Draughtsmen (AESD). He acted on behalf of colleagues in a dispute about overtime pay, which was won. This raised his profile in the union, and he was elected to its council in 1917, serving on its statistical sub-committee.

In December 1917, the AESD decided to, for the first time, appoint a full-time general secretary. Doig stood for the post, defeating T. C. Dickie, W. Herd, W. MacFarlane and David Manktelow, and taking up the position in January 1918. The union grew greatly under his leadership; by the time he retired on health grounds in 1945, it was a force in the engineering and shipbuilding industries.

In his spare time, Doig studied astronomy and wrote books on the subject.

Trade union offices
| Preceded by L. Blair | General Secretary of the Association of Engineering and Shipbuilding Draughtsmen; 1918–1945 | Succeeded by James Young |
