= Reginald H. Pott =

British politician

Reginald Henry Pott (1870 – 26 January 1957) was a British politician and stockbroker.

Born in Kensington, Pott married Rosina Mary Corbould in 1896. The couple became involved in the women's suffrage movement, with Pott joining the Men's Political Union, and becoming treasurer of the Men's League for Women's Suffrage. In 1910, he wrote "The Purple, Green and White March", for the Women's Social and Political Union's demonstration.

Pott joined the Labour Party, and at the 1931 London County Council election, he was elected to represent Woolwich East. After the party won a majority, in 1934, he became the chair of the council's highways committee, and in 1943/44 he served as vice chair of the council. He stood down in 1949, and died early in 1957.
