= Francis Beech =

British politician

Major Francis William Beech CBE (5 June 1885 – 21 February 1969) was a British military officer and politician, who served as the Conservative Member of Parliament for Woolwich West from 1943 to 1945.

Beech was educated at Long Ashton, outside Bristol, and then attended Lewis School, Pengam, in south Wales. He qualified as a solicitor in 1911.

Following the outbreak of the First World War, Beech took a commission in the British Army in 1915, and served until 1926 as an officer in the Royal Army Pay Corps, retiring from active service as a major and staff paymaster.

In 1937 he was elected as one of two councillors for Woolwich West to the London County Council, as a Municipal Reform Party candidate, and remained in office for the next nine years. In November 1943 he was also elected to the House of Commons for the same constituency, representing the Conservative Party; he succeeded Sir Kingsley Wood, the former chancellor of the exchequer, who had died in office. Due to the war-time electoral truce, the by-election was not contested by the Labour or Liberal parties, and Beech won a clear majority over an Independent Labour Party candidate and another independent. Beech contested the seat at the 1945 general election, but was defeated by the Labour candidate Henry Berry.

In 1946, he was also defeated for re-election to the London County Council, with both Woolwich West seats being won by Labour. However, Beech returned to the Council in the 1949 election (this time as a Conservative, the "Municipal Reform" label having been dropped), and served until 1955. From 1952 to 1953 he was Deputy Chairman of the council.

After leaving the council, he served as Mayor of Woolwich from 1955 to 1956; he had previously been made a Freeman of the borough as well as of the City of London. He also served as a Justice of the Peace for London.

Beech was married twice; first to Florence Jenkins (married 1914; died 1963), with whom he had one daughter; and secondly, after Florence's death, to Phyllis Cooper (married 1963).
