= Tom Colyer =

British socialist activist

William Thomas Colyer (1883–1956) was a British socialist activist.

Colyer worked as a civil servant in the years running up to World War I. He opposed the war, joining the Independent Labour Party, and refused to assist in compiling the National Register, which was to be used for conscription. In 1915, he and his wife Amy moved to Massachusetts, joining the Socialist Party of America. Tom became its state vice-president, but as a supporter of the October Revolution, he was a founder of the Communist Party USA split.

In 1922, Tom and Amy were detained on Deer Island and threatened with deportation back to the United Kingdom for their communist activism. While at the camp, they formed a prisoners' soviet. They took their case to the United States Court of Appeals for the First Circuit and lost; they considered further appealing to the United States Supreme Court, but ultimately decided against this course of action, and were deported on 11 April 1922.

Back in the UK, Tom published Americanism: A World Menace, which criticised the country for its anti-communism, Fordism, and religious influence in politics. He joined both the Communist Party of Great Britain (CPGB) and the Labour Party. In 1926, he became the secretary of the Greater London Left-Wing Movement, and then the founding secretary of its national counterpart, the National Left-Wing Movement. However, at the end of the year, he resigned from the movement, objecting to the co-option of Sunday Worker representatives onto its governing body. The CPGB argued that Colyer had been ineffective and had failed to develop the national movement; Colyer resigned from the CPGB, devoting his time to the Labour Party.

Colyer became the chair of the Kent Federation of Labour Parties, and stood unsuccessfully as the party's candidate in Chislehurst at the 1931 and 1935 United Kingdom general elections. However, in 1942, he resigned to instead join the Independent Labour Party (ILP). He stood for the ILP in the 1943 Woolwich West by-election, taking second place with 27.2% of the vote, and later served on the party's National Administrative Council, first as a representative of the London region, then as one of four national members.

== Independent working class education ==
Coyler became an advocate of independent working class education. He wrote reports for the Labour Research Department and worked on revising and writing books for the National Council of Labour Colleges (N.C.L.C:

- The Worker's Passport : a Study of the Legal Restrictions on Migrant Workers – Prepared for the Labour Defence Council London: Labour Research Department, 1928
- An Outline of Economics: Originally written by William McLaine and published in 1921, this was substantially rewritten by Colyer in 1932 with further revisions in 1949.
- An Outline History of Unemployment, London: N. C. L. C., 1936.

Non-profit organization positions
Preceded by New position	Secretary of the National Left-Wing Movement; 1936	Succeeded by Ralph Bond
Party political offices
Preceded by Walter Padley	London Division representative on the Independent Labour Party National Administrative Council; 1946–1947	Succeeded by Wilfred Wigham
