= William Steward (British politician) =

British politician (1901–1987)

Sir William Arthur Steward (20 April 1901 – May 1987) was a British Conservative party politician, who served as Member of Parliament for Woolwich West from 1950 to 1959.

Steward was educated at Norwich Model School and privately and became a restaurateur and farmer. He served as senior catering officer with the Royal Air Force during World War II, obtaining the rank of squadron leader. He was a liveryman of the Worshipful Company of Distillers and a member of the Council of the Caterers' Association.

The Veeraswamy restaurant in Regent Street, which had originated as the Indian Pavilion restaurant at the 1924-5 British Empire Exhibition in Wembley Park, was taken over by Steward in 1930. He was married to a singer and artist of the time Greta Gaye. Throughout the 1930s trade was very difficult but the couple used great resourcefulness and came through the challenging times. In the 1940s and 1950s the restaurant became a great success. The first ever curry in a can was introduced under Veeraswarmy Food Products brand in the early 1950s. The restaurant was sold by Sir William in 1967. The food products business under the Veeraswarmy name continued in to be owned by the couple until his death.

Steward stood in Southwark Central at the 1945 general election without success, and was elected at the 1950 general election for Woolwich West. Continuing his interest in catering, he was chairman of the House of Commons Catering Committee from 1951. He was elected chairman of the London Conservative Union in 1953. He was knighted in 1955.

Parliament of the United Kingdom
Preceded by Henry Berry	Member of Parliament for Woolwich West; 1950–1959	Succeeded by Colin William Carstairs Turner
