= 1943 Woolwich West by-election =

UK Parliamentary by-election

The 1943 Woolwich West by-election was held on 10 November 1943. The by-election was held due to the death of the incumbent Conservative MP, Kingsley Wood.

The Conservative Party stood Francis Beech, a member of London County Council. The Independent Labour Party put forward Tom Colyer as a candidate. He was a former Labour Party Parliamentary candidate, who was working as a researcher and author. There was also an independent candidate. Beech won the election with a majority of the votes cast.

Woolwich West by-election, 1943
Party	Candidate	Votes	%	±%
Conservative	Francis Beech	8,204	65.2	+6.5
Ind. Labour Party	Tom Colyer	3,419	27.2	New
Independent	J. Ellis	958	7.6	New
Majority		4,785	38.0	+20.7
Turnout		12,581		
Conservative hold		Swing		
