= Woolwich East (electoral division) =

Electoral division in Greater London, 1973–1986

- Former electoral division for the Greater London Council
- District: Greenwich
- Electorate: 50,755 (1973); 51,172 (1977); 54,572 (1981)
- Area: 1,504 hectares (15.04 km^{2})

Former electoral division
- Created: 1973
- Abolished: 1986
- Member: 1
- Created from: Greenwich

Woolwich East was an electoral division for the purposes of elections to the Greater London Council. The constituency elected one councillor for a four-year term in 1973, 1977 and 1981, with the final term extended for an extra year ahead of the abolition of the Greater London Council.

== History ==
It was planned to use the same boundaries as the Westminster Parliament constituencies for election of councillors to the Greater London Council (GLC), as had been the practice for elections to the predecessor London County Council, but those that existed in 1965 crossed the Greater London boundary. Until new constituencies could be settled, the 32 London boroughs were used as electoral areas. The London Borough of Greenwich formed the Greenwich electoral division. This was used for the Greater London Council elections in 1964, 1967 and 1970.

The new constituencies were settled following the Second Periodic Review of Westminster constituencies and the new electoral division matched the boundaries of the Woolwich East parliamentary constituency.

It covered an area of 1,504 hectares (15.04 km^{2}).

== Elections ==
The Woolwich East constituency was used for the Greater London Council elections in 1973, 1977 and 1981. One councillor was elected at each election using first-past-the-post voting.

=== 1973 election ===
The fourth election to the GLC (and first using revised boundaries) was held on 12 April 1973. The electorate was 50,755 and one Labour Party councillor was elected. The turnout was 34.8%. The councillor was elected for a three-year term. This was extended for an extra year in 1976 when the electoral cycle was switched to four-yearly.

1973 Greater London Council election: Woolwich East
Party	Candidate	Votes	%	±%
Labour	Mair Eluned Garside	11,880	67.21	
Conservative	A. R. Dix	3,164	17.90	
Liberal	R. H. Smith	1,860	10.52	
Action	J. P. Sibley	442	2.50	
Communist	A. A. Curtis	332	1.88	
Turnout				
Labour win (new seat)				

=== 1977 election ===
The fifth election to the GLC (and second using revised boundaries) was held on 5 May 1977. The electorate was 51,172 and one Labour Party councillor was elected. The turnout was 39.1%. The councillor was elected for a four-year term.

1977 Greater London Council election: Woolwich East
Party	Candidate	Votes	%	±%
Labour	Mair Eluned Garside	10,412	52.04	
Conservative	M. C. Punyer	7,074	35.35	
National Front	H. Steven	1,019	5.09	
Liberal	G. H. Knight	1,004	5.02	
Communist	T. A. Bell	266	1.33	
National Party	T. A. Heath	236	1.18	
Turnout				
Labour hold		Swing		

=== 1981 election ===
The sixth and final election to the GLC (and third using revised boundaries) was held on 7 May 1981. The electorate was 54,572 and one Labour Party councillor was elected. The turnout was 41.1%. The councillor was elected for a four-year term, extended by an extra year by the Local Government (Interim Provisions) Act 1984, ahead of the abolition of the council.

1981 Greater London Council election: Woolwich East
Party	Candidate	Votes	%	±%
Labour	Mair Eluned Garside	14,596	65.13	
Conservative	David A. S. Tredinnick	4,920	21.95	
Liberal	David J. Hall	2,094	9.34	
Ecology	Nicholas P. F. Drey	260	1.16	
National Front	Frank S. Hitches	190	0.85	
NNF	Henry E. Dunster	186	0.83	
Workers Revolutionary	Alan Clark	169	0.75	
Turnout				
Labour hold		Swing		
