= Eltham (constituency) =

UK Parliament constituency (1983–2024)

Coordinates: 51.456°N 0.062°E

- Former borough constituency for the House of Commons
- Boundary of Eltham in Greater London
- County: Greater London
- Electorate: 64,084 (Dec 2019)
- Major settlements: Eltham and Kidbrooke

1983–2024
- Seats: One
- Created from: Woolwich West
- Replaced by: Eltham & Chislehurst

Eltham (/ˈɛltəm/ EL-təm) was a constituency (Note: A borough constituency (for the purposes of election expenses and type of returning officer).) in Greater London created in 1983 and represented by Clive Efford of the Labour Party in the House of Commons of the UK Parliament from 1997 until its abolition for the 2024 general election. (Note: As with all constituencies, Eltham elects one Member of Parliament (MP) by the first past the post system of election at least every five years.)

The seat broadly covered the southern half of the Royal Borough of Greenwich.

Under the 2023 Periodic Review of Westminster constituencies, the seat was subject to boundary changes which incorporated the Borough of Bromley communities of Chislehurst and Mottingham. As a consequence, it was replaced by Eltham and Chislehurst, first contested at the 2024 general election.

== Boundaries ==
Map of boundaries 2010-2024

1983–1997: The London Borough of Greenwich wards of Avery Hill, Coldharbour, Deansfield, Eltham Park, Herbert, Middle Park, New Eltham, Nightingale, Palace, Sherard, Sutcliffe, Tarn, and Well Hall.

1997–2010: As above less Nightingale, plus Plumstead Common, Shrewsbury, and Slade.

2010–2024: The London Borough of Greenwich wards of Coldharbour and New Eltham, Eltham North, Eltham South, Eltham West, Kidbrooke with Hornfair, Middle Park and Sutcliffe, and Shooters Hill.

The constituency was in the Royal Borough of Greenwich in south-east London. Before 1983, a constituency with similar boundaries was called Woolwich West.

The seat was bordered by the constituencies of:

- Bromley and Chislehurst
- Erith and Thamesmead
- Greenwich and Woolwich
- Lewisham East
- Old Bexley and Sidcup

== Constituency profile ==
The constituency is centred on Eltham which has a typical High Street shopping area, surrounded by 20th century suburbs such as Mottingham and New Eltham. There are two railway lines in the seat and many residents commute to Central London. Residents' health and wealth are around average for the UK.

Most central and southern wards have tended in local elections since 1997 to elect Conservative councillors whereas the other wards are inclined to Labour such as West Eltham. The former areas have more owner-occupied houses and are more middle-class. Labour has fared well in the same period in the northern areas of the constituency towards Greenwich, and in areas such as Shooters Hill and Well Hall with the exception of the conservation area parts of Blackheath adding to one ward.

== History ==
Summary of results

The 2015 result gave the seat the 28th-smallest majority of Labour's 232 seats by percentage of majority.

The seat was held by high-profile Tory Peter Bottomley from its inception in 1983. Bottomley had been the MP for abolished Woolwich West before 1983. Labour's Clive Efford gained the seat in 1997, the first Eltham election in which Bottomley did not stand. Bottomley was standing instead for Worthing West, where he served as MP until 2024. After a further absolute majority in 2001, Efford's majority decreased in 2005; he resisted some national swing against the party in 2010 to hold the seat.

Opposition since 1997

Conservative and UKIP candidates won more than 5% of the vote in 2015 therefore kept their deposits. Conservative Drury fell 6.2% short of winning the seat in 2015; in 2017, however, Efford more than doubled his margin to 6,296, Labour's largest majority in the seat since 1997.

First use of open primaries in London

In 2006, the Eltham Conservative Association became the first in London to select a prospective parliamentary candidate by means of an open primary election, where any voter on the electoral roll was entitled to attend and vote. David Gold (PPC Brighton Pavilion 2001) defeated Jackie Doyle-Price (PPC Sheffield Hillsborough 2005) and Eric Ollerenshaw (former London Assembly member), by winning more than 50% of the ballot in the first round at a meeting chaired by Michael Portillo on 31 July 2006 at the Bob Hope Theatre. Approximately 140 people attended the open primary. Ironically while Gold was defeated in Eltham at the 2010 General Election, both Doyle-Price and Ollerenshaw won seats elsewhere.

== Members of Parliament ==
Election	Member	Party
1983	Peter Bottomley	Conservative
1997	Clive Efford	Labour

== Election results ==
=== Elections in the 2010s ===
General election 2019: Eltham
Party	Candidate	Votes	%	±%
Labour	Clive Efford	20,550	47.0	−7.4
Conservative	Louie French	17,353	39.7	−1.1
Liberal Democrats	Charley Hasted	2,941	6.7	+3.5
Brexit Party	Steve Kelleher	1,523	3.5	New
Green	Matthew Stratford	1,322	3.0	New
Majority		3,197	7.3	−6.3
Turnout		43,689	68.2	−3.4
Registered electors		64,084		
Labour hold		Swing	-3.2	

General election 2017: Eltham
Party	Candidate	Votes	%	±%
Labour	Clive Efford	25,128	54.4	+11.8
Conservative	Matt Hartley	18,832	40.8	+4.4
Liberal Democrats	David Hall-Matthews	1,457	3.2	+0.2
BNP	John Clarke	738	1.6	New
Majority		6,296	13.6	+7.4
Turnout		46,155	71.6	+4.2
Registered electors		64,474		
Labour hold		Swing	+3.7	

General election 2015: Eltham
Party	Candidate	Votes	%	±%
Labour	Clive Efford	18,393	42.6	+1.1
Conservative	Spencer Drury	15,700	36.4	−1.1
UKIP	Peter Whittle	6,481	15.0	+12.6
Liberal Democrats	Alex Cunliffe	1,308	3.0	−9.6
Green	James Parker	1,275	3.0	+2.0
Majority		2,693	6.2	+2.2
Turnout		43,157	67.4	+0.4
Registered electors		63,998		
Labour hold		Swing	+1.1	

General election 2010: Eltham
Party	Candidate	Votes	%	±%
Labour	Clive Efford	17,416	41.5	−0.7
Conservative	David Gold	15,753	37.5	+2.9
Liberal Democrats	Steven Toole	5,299	12.6	−4.7
BNP	Roberta Woods	1,745	4.2	+1.6
UKIP	Ray Adams	1,011	2.4	−0.4
Green	Arthur Hayles	419	1.0	New
English Democrat	Mike Tibby	217	0.5	New
Independent	Andrew Graham	104	0.2	−0.2
Majority		1,663	4.0	−5.3
Turnout		41,964	67.0	+8.6
Registered electors		77,724		
Labour hold		Swing	-1.8	

=== Elections in the 2000s ===
General election 2005: Eltham
Party	Candidate	Votes	%	±%
Labour	Clive Efford	15,381	43.6	−9.2
Conservative	Spencer Drury	12,105	34.3	+2.2
Liberal Democrats	Ian Gerrard	5,669	16.1	+3.9
UKIP	Jeremy Elms	1,024	2.9	+0.8
BNP	Barry Roberts	979	2.8	New
Independent	Andrew Graham	147	0.4	−0.3
Majority		3,276	9.3	−11.4
Turnout		35,305	61.7	+3.0
Registered electors		56,797		
Labour hold		Swing	-5.7	

General election 2001: Eltham
Party	Candidate	Votes	%	±%
Labour	Clive Efford	17,855	52.8	−1.8
Conservative	Sharon Massey	10,859	32.1	+0.9
Liberal Democrats	Martin Morris	4,121	12.2	+3.7
UKIP	Terrence Jones	706	2.1	New
Independent	Andrew Graham	251	0.7	New
Majority		6,996	20.7	−5.3
Turnout		33,792	58.7	−17.0
Registered electors		57,554		
Labour hold		Swing	-1.8	

=== Elections in the 1990s ===
General election 1997: Eltham
Party	Candidate	Votes	%	±%
Labour	Clive Efford	23,710	54.6	+12.7
Conservative	Clive D Blackwood	13,528	31.2	−14.8
Liberal Democrats	Amanda J Taylor	3,701	8.5	−3.2
Referendum	Matthew D Clark	1,414	3.3	New
Liberal	Henry Middleton	584	1.3	New
BNP	William A Hitches	491	1.1	New
Majority		10,182	23.4	N/A
Turnout		43,428	75.7	−3.0
Registered electors		57,358		
Labour gain from Conservative		Swing	-13.6	

General election 1992: Eltham
Party	Candidate	Votes	%	±%
Conservative	Peter Bottomley	18,813	46.0	−1.5
Labour	Clive Efford	17,147	41.9	+9.9
Liberal Democrats	Christopher P. McGinty	4,804	11.7	−8.8
Independent	Andrew Graham	165	0.4	New
Majority		1,666	4.1	−11.4
Turnout		40,929	78.7	+1.8
Registered electors		51,989		
Conservative hold		Swing	-5.6	

=== Elections in the 1980s ===
General election 1987: Eltham
Party	Candidate	Votes	%	±%
Conservative	Peter Bottomley	19,752	47.5	−0.4
Labour	Rees Vaughan	13,292	32.0	+2.7
Liberal	Edward Randall	8,542	20.5	−1.7
Majority		6,460	15.5	−3.1
Turnout		41,586	76.9	+2.8
Registered electors		54,063		
Conservative hold		Swing	-1.6	

General election 1983: Eltham
Party	Candidate	Votes	%	±%
Conservative	Peter Bottomley	19,530	47.9	+0.1
Labour	Colin Moore	11,938	29.3	−11.7
Liberal	Edward Randall	9,030	22.2	+12.5
BNP	PT Banks	276	0.7	New
Majority		7,592	18.6	
Turnout		40,774	74.1	
Registered electors		55,062		
Conservative win (new seat)				

1979 notional result
Party	Vote	%
Conservative	20,905	47.8
Labour	17,959	41.0
Liberal	4,261	9.7
Others	644	1.5
Turnout	43,769	
Electorate		

== See also ==
- List of parliamentary constituencies in London
- Politics of Greenwich
- Royal Borough of Greenwich
- Greenwich London Borough Council
