= Woolwich West (UK Parliament constituency) =

Parliamentary constituency in the United Kingdom, 1918–1983

- Former borough constituency for the House of Commons
- County: Greater London

1918–1983
- Seats: One
- Created from: Woolwich
- Replaced by: Eltham

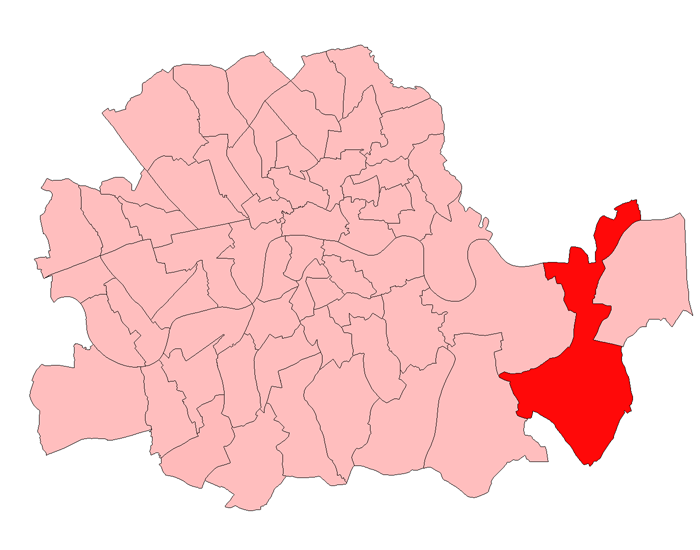
Woolwich West in the County of London 1918–1950

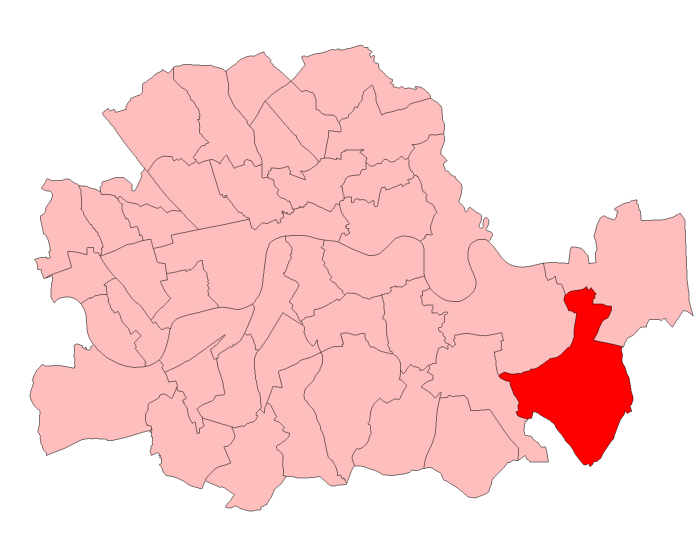
Woolwich West in the County of London 1950–1955

Final approximate outline of this seat. Click for surrounding seats. (Colouring: Feb 1974 results)

Woolwich West was a borough constituency represented in the House of Commons of the Parliament of the United Kingdom from 1918 until 1983. It centred on Eltham, now in the Royal Borough of Greenwich in south-east London.

The constituency was formed for the 1918 general election, when the constituency of Woolwich was divided into Woolwich West and Woolwich East, and abolished in 1983. Although the boundaries changed, Woolwich West in effect became the new Eltham constituency.

== Boundaries ==
1918–1950: The Metropolitan Borough of Woolwich wards of Dockyard, Eltham, Herbert, River, St. George's, and St Mary's.

1950–1955: The Metropolitan Borough of Woolwich wards of Avery Hill, Herbert, St George's, Sherard, and Well Hall.

1955–1974: The Metropolitan Borough of Woolwich wards of Avery Hill, Coldharbour, Eltham Green, Falconwood, Herbert, Horn Park, Middle Park, New Eltham, St George's, Sherard, Shooters Hill, and Well Hall.

1974–1983: The London Borough of Greenwich wards of academy, Coldharbour, Eltham, Horn Park, Middle Park, New Eltham, St George's, Sherard, Shooters Hill, and Well Hall.

== Members of Parliament ==
Election	Member	Party
1918	Sir Kingsley Wood	Conservative
1943 by-election	Francis Beech	Conservative
1945	Henry Berry	Labour
1950	William Steward	Conservative
1959	Colin Turner	Conservative
1964	Bill Hamling	Labour
1975 by-election	Peter Bottomley	Conservative
1983	constituency abolished	

== Elections ==
=== Elections in the 1970s ===
General election 1979: Woolwich West
Party	Candidate	Votes	%	±%
Conservative	Peter Bottomley	21,222	47.3	+8.7
Labour	Diana Page	18,613	41.5	−5.6
Liberal	(Peter) John Churchill	4,363	9.7	−4.6
National Front	Malcolm Skeggs	630	1.4	N/A
Majority		2,609	5.8	N/A
Turnout		44,828	79.6	+5.7
Conservative gain from Labour		Swing	+0.5	

1975 Woolwich West by-election
Party	Candidate	Votes	%	±%
Conservative	Peter Bottomley	17,280	48.8	+10.2
Labour	Joseph Stanyer	14,898	42.1	−5.0
Liberal	Sheilagh Hobday	1,884	5.3	−9.0
National Front	Ruth Robinson	856	2.4	New
Fellowship	Ronald Mallone	218	0.6	New
English National	Frank Hansford-Miller	140	0.4	New
Conservative, Anti-Common Market	Reginald Simmerson	104	0.3	New
Independent	Peter Bishop	41	0.1	New
Majority		2,382	6.7	N/A
Turnout		35,525	46.4	−27.5
Conservative gain from Labour		Swing	+7.61	

General election October 1974: Woolwich West
Party	Candidate	Votes	%	±%
Labour	William Hamling	19,614	47.1	+3.0
Conservative	Peter Bottomley	16,073	38.6	−0.2
Liberal	JP Johnson	5,962	14.3	−2.9
Majority		3,541	8.5	+3.2
Turnout		41,649	73.9	−8.0
Labour hold		Swing	+1.6	

General election February 1974: Woolwich West
Party	Candidate	Votes	%	±%
Labour	William Hamling	20,126	44.1	−6.7
Conservative	Peter Bottomley	17,690	38.8	−10.5
Liberal	JP Johnson	7,833	17.2	New
Majority		2,436	5.3	+3.8
Turnout		45,649	81.9	+10.0
Labour hold		Swing	+1.9	

General election 1970: Woolwich West
Party	Candidate	Votes	%	±%
Labour	William Hamling	21,036	50.8	−2.9
Conservative	Maurice Patrick Gaffney	20,418	49.3	+5.0
Majority		618	1.5	−7.9
Turnout		41,454	71.9	−9.5
Labour hold		Swing	−3.9	

=== Elections in the 1960s ===
General election 1966: Woolwich West
Party	Candidate	Votes	%	±%
Labour	William Hamling	23,344	53.7	+2.9
Conservative	Maurice Patrick Gaffney	19,256	44.3	−2.4
Fellowship	Ronald Mallone	906	2.1	−0.4
Majority		4,088	9.4	+5.4
Turnout		43,506	81.4	+0.1
Labour hold		Swing	+2.6	

General election 1964: Woolwich West
Party	Candidate	Votes	%	±%
Labour	William Hamling	22,420	50.8	+6.1
Conservative	Colin Turner	20,639	46.7	−6.0
Fellowship	Ronald Mallone	1,112	2.5	−0.1
Majority		1,781	4.0	N/A
Turnout		44,171	81.3	−3.5
Labour gain from Conservative		Swing	+6.1	

=== Elections in the 1950s ===
General election 1959: Woolwich West
Party	Candidate	Votes	%	±%
Conservative	Colin Turner	24,373	52.7	+0.7
Labour	William Hamling	20,678	44.7	−3.3
Fellowship	Ronald Mallone	1,189	2.6	New
Majority		3,695	8.0	+4.0
Turnout		46,240	84.8	+1.5
Conservative hold		Swing	+2.0	

General election 1955: Woolwich West
Party	Candidate	Votes	%	±%
Conservative	William Steward	23,981	52.0	+2.7
Labour	William Hamling	22,101	48.0	+1.6
Majority		1,880	4.0	+1.1
Turnout		46,082	83.3	+1.2
Conservative hold		Swing	+0.5	

General election 1951: Woolwich West
Party	Candidate	Votes	%	±%
Conservative	William Steward	23,385	49.3	+2.7
Labour	John Silkin	22,041	46.4	+0.1
Liberal	David Phillips	2,040	4.3	−2.9
Majority		1,344	2.9	+2.6
Turnout		47,466	82.1	−5.0
Conservative hold		Swing	+1.3	

General election 1950: Woolwich West
Party	Candidate	Votes	%	±%
Conservative	William Steward	21,257	46.6	+8.2
Labour	Henry Berry	21,118	46.3	−15.0
Liberal	WR Roberts	3,279	7.2	New
Majority		139	0.3	N/A
Turnout		45,654	87.1	+14.8
Conservative gain from Labour		Swing	+11.6	

=== Elections in the 1940s ===
General election 1945: Woolwich West
Party	Candidate	Votes	%	±%
Labour	Henry Berry	23,655	61.6	+20.3
Conservative	Francis Beech	14,771	38.4	−20.3
Majority		8,884	23.2	N/A
Turnout		38,426	72.3	−3.5
Labour gain from Conservative		Swing	+20.3	

1943 Woolwich West by-election
Party	Candidate	Votes	%	±%
Conservative	Francis Beech	8,204	65.2	+6.5
Ind. Labour Party	Tom Colyer	3,419	27.2	New
Independent	J. Ellis	958	7.6	New
Majority		4,785	38.0	+20.7
Turnout		12,581		
Conservative hold		Swing		

=== Elections in the 1930s ===
General election 1935: Woolwich West
Party	Candidate	Votes	%	±%
Conservative	Kingsley Wood	24,649	58.7	−5.9
Labour	Arthur George Wansbrough	17,373	41.3	+5.9
Majority		7,276	17.3	−11.8
Turnout		42,022	75.8	−1.6
Conservative hold		Swing	−5.9	

General election 1931: Woolwich West
Party	Candidate	Votes	%	±%
Conservative	Kingsley Wood	26,441	64.6	+24.6
Labour Co-op	Joseph Reeves	14,520	35.4	−8.8
Majority		11,921	29.1	+20.3
Turnout		40,961	77.4	+0.6
Conservative hold		Swing		

=== Elections in the 1920s ===
General election 1929: Woolwich West
Party	Candidate	Votes	%	±%
Unionist	Kingsley Wood	17,296	45.0	−12.3
Labour	William Barefoot	16,964	44.2	+1.5
Liberal	Arthur Stanley Phillips	4,140	10.8	New
Majority		332	0.8	−13.8
Turnout		38,400	76.8	−2.9
Registered electors		50,014		
Unionist hold		Swing	−6.9	

General election 1924: Woolwich West
Party	Candidate	Votes	%	±%
Unionist	Kingsley Wood	16,504	57.3	+5.1
Labour	William Barefoot	12,304	42.7	−5.1
Majority		4,200	14.6	+10.2
Turnout		28,808	79.7	+11.9
Registered electors		36,153		
Unionist hold		Swing	+5.1	

General election 1923: Woolwich West
Party	Candidate	Votes	%	±%
Unionist	Kingsley Wood	12,380	52.2	−8.0
Labour	William Barefoot	11,357	47.8	+8.0
Majority		1,023	4.4	−16.0
Turnout		23,737	67.8	−2.3
Registered electors		35,032		
Unionist hold		Swing	−8.0	

General election 1922: Woolwich West
Party	Candidate	Votes	%	±%
Unionist	Kingsley Wood	14,453	60.2	+0.1
Labour	J.T. Sheppard	9,550	39.8	+5.3
Majority		4,903	20.4	−5.2
Turnout		24,003	70.1	+10.1
Registered electors		34,242		
Unionist hold		Swing	−2.6	

=== Election in the 1910s ===
General election 1918: Woolwich West
Party		Candidate	Votes	%	±%
C	Unionist	Kingsley Wood	12,348	60.1	
	Labour	Alexander Gordon Cameron	7,088	34.5	
	Ind. Unionist	W.A. Adam	1,109	5.4	
Majority			5,260	25.6	
Turnout			20,545	60.0	
Registered electors			34,248		
	Unionist win (new seat)				
C indicates candidate endorsed by the coalition government.

Parliament of the United Kingdom
Preceded by Spen Valley	Constituency represented by the chancellor of the Exchequer; 1940–1943	Succeeded by Combined Scottish Universities
