= Henry Berry (politician) =

British politician

Henry Berry CBE (7 January 1883 – 14 February 1956) was a British Labour Party politician.

Born in Woolwich, Berry was educated at Woolwich Polytechnic, then at Goldsmiths College. He became a mechanical and structural engineer, and also became active in the Labour Party. He was elected to the Metropolitan Water Board in 1923, chairing it from 1940 until 1946. He also served on Woolwich Borough Council, and was Mayor of Woolwich in 1935/36, and on the London County Council from 1928 to 1955, including as vice chairman from 1940 until 1944.

Berry also promoted allotments, and was treasurer of the National Allotments Society from 1923, and president of the International Allotments Federation from 1947 until 1949.

In the Labour landslide at the 1945 general election, Berry was elected as Member of Parliament for Woolwich West, in south-east London. However, at the 1950 general election, he lost his seat to the Conservative candidate William Steward.

In 1951, Berry was made a Commander of the Order of the British Empire.

Parliament of the United Kingdom
Preceded by Francis William Beech	Member of Parliament for Woolwich West; 1945–1950	Succeeded by William Steward
Civic offices
Preceded by Alfred Henry Gilder	Mayor of Woolwich; 1935–1936	Succeeded by Mabel Crout
Preceded by William Prescott	Chairman of the Metropolitan Water Board; 1940–1946	Succeeded by Harold Henry Gibbons
