= Ben Jones =

Ben Jones may refer to:

== In sports ==
=== Australia ===
- Ben Jones (Australian rugby league, born 1980), Australian rugby league player for the Canberra Raiders
- Ben Jones (Australian rugby league, born 1990), Australian rugby league player for the North Queensland Cowboys

=== Canada ===
- Ben Jones (ice hockey) (born 1999)

=== United Kingdom ===
- Ben Jones (footballer, born 1880) (c. 1880–?), English soccer player
- Benny Jones (footballer, born 1907), see 1931–32 Rochdale A.F.C. season
- Ben Jones (footballer, born 1992), Welsh football player
- Benjamin Jones (cyclist) (1882–1963), British 1908 Olympic gold medalist and Empire Games champion
- Ben Jones (rugby union, born 1983), English rugby union player, currently playing for Worcester Warriors
- Ben Jones (English rugby league) (born 1988), English rugby league player for York City Knights
- Ben Jones (rugby union, born 1998), Welsh rugby union player
- Ben Jones-Bishop (born 1988), English rugby league player for Leeds Rhinos
- Reuben Jones (1932–1990), British athlete
- Ben Jones (jockey) (born 1999), Welsh jockey

=== United States ===
- Ben A. Jones (1882–1961), American thoroughbred horse trainer
- Ben F. Jones (born 1941), American visual artist, educator and activist
- Ben Jones (halfback) (1899–1929), American football halfback
- Ben Jones (offensive lineman) (born 1989), American football offensive lineman
- Ben Jones (racing driver) (1903–1938), American racecar driver

== In the arts ==
- Ben Jones (American actor and politician) (1941–2026), American actor and politician
- Ben F. Jones (born 1941), American visual artist
- Ben Jones (British actor) (born 1972), British actor
- Ben Jones (American cartoonist) (born 1977), member of the collective Paper Rad
- Ben Jones (DJ) (born 1977), British radio DJ
- Ben Jones (musician) (born 1982), English singer, songwriter, musician and producer
- Ben York Jones (born 1984), American actor and screenwriter

== Other ==
- Ben Jones (co-operator) (1847–1942), British co-operative and political activist
- Ben Jones (Grenadian politician) (1924–2005), Grenadian politician
- Ben Jones (Welsh solicitor) (1914–1989), Welsh solicitor and Liberal Party politician
- Benjamin Jones (economist) (born 1972), professor at Kellogg School of Management
- Benjamin F. Jones (born 1966), American historian and academic administrator
- Detective Sergeant Ben Jones, leading character in the British TV series Midsomer Murders

== See also ==
- Benjamin Jones (disambiguation)
