= 1903 Woolwich by-election =

1903 UK parliamentary by-election

- 11 March 1903

Woolwich constituency
- Registered: 16,136
- Turnout: 87.7%
	First party	Second party
	Lab
Candidate	Will Crooks	Geoffrey Drage
Party	Labour Repr. Cmte.	Conservative
Popular vote	8,687	5,458
Percentage	61.4%	38.6%
Swing	New	N/A (Note: The previous election saw the MP elected unopposed, so no vote was held and no comparisons can be made.)
MP before election
Charles Beresford
Conservative
Elected MP
Will Crooks
Labour Repr. Cmte.

A by-election for the United Kingdom parliamentary constituency of Woolwich was held on 11 March 1903. It was trigged by the resignation of incumbent MP, Charles Beresford. The by-election resulted in Will Crooks, the Labour Representation Committee candidate, beating his Conservative opponent.

== Background ==
The constituency had a by-election in 1902 to replace the resignation of Edwin Hughes due to ill health. In this by-election, Charles Beresford was elected unopposed as the Conservative candidate. He subsequently resigned as MP in 1903 after accepting a position as commander of the Channel Fleet.

== Candidates and campaign ==
The Conservative candidate was selected at a meeting attended by Lord Charles Beresford on the day of his resignation. Several candidates were discussed, but the local conservative association accepted the offer of Geoffrey Drage to stand. He was a writer and commentator who had served as member of parliament for Derby from 1895 to 1900, when he lost that seat.

The Labour Representation Committee came to an agreement with the Liberals for them to stand down in the by-election, making the race between solely their candidate, Will Crooks, and the Conservative. Local liberal organisations and papers supported Crooks's campaign.

Crooks was a moderate, and the mayor of Poplar. During the by-election, he focused on basic economic issues like unemployment, housing and wages.

== Result ==
1903 Woolwich by-election
Party	Candidate	Votes	%	±%
Labour Repr. Cmte.	Will Crooks	8,687	61.4	New
Conservative	Geoffrey Drage	5,458	38.6	N/A
Majority		3,229	22.8	N/A
Turnout		14,145	87.7	N/A
Registered electors		16,136		
Labour Repr. Cmte. gain from Conservative		Swing	N/A	

== Previous result ==
1902 Woolwich by-election
Party	Candidate	Votes	%	±%
Conservative	Charles Beresford	Unopposed		
Registered electors		15,376		
Conservative hold				

== Legacy and aftermath ==
Crooks became the fourth Labour MP in the party's history. His by-election victory exceeded expectations at the time, with the then Speaker of the House describing it as the most spectacular by-election victory of modern times.

Crooks held on to the seat in the subsequent 1906 general election, and remained an MP in Woolwich (later Woolwich East) until 1921, with a brief stint outside Parliament in 1910.
