= Benjamin Jones =

Benjamin Jones may refer to:

- Benjamin Jones (congressman) (1787–1861), U.S. Representative from Ohio
- Benjamin Jones (cyclist) (1882–1963), British track cyclist
- Benjamin Jones (author), 19th century author, see 1824 in Wales
- Benjamin Jones (rugby union), full back for Coca-Cola Red Sparks
- Benjamin F. Jones (born 1966), American historian and academic administrator
- Benjamin Jones (economist) (born 1972), professor at Kellogg School of Management
- Benjamin Franklin Jones (New Jersey politician) (1869–1935), Speaker of the New Jersey General Assembly
- Benjamin Franklin Jones (industrialist) (1824–1903), pioneer of the iron and steel industry in Pittsburgh
- Benjamin Franklin Jones Cottage in Pennsylvania
- Benjamin R. Jones (1906–1980), Chief Justice of the Pennsylvania Supreme Court
- Benny Jones (Thomas Benjamin Jones, 1920–1972), English footballer
- Benny Jones (baseball), American baseball player
- Ben Jones (co-operator) (1847–1942), British co-operator
- Benjamin Jones (scientist) (born 1991), British marine scientist.
- Detective Sergeant Benjamin "Ben" Jones, a fictional character played by Jason Hughes in the UK TV series Midsomer Murders

== See also ==
- Ben Jones (disambiguation)
