= Adam v Ward =

- Court: House of Lords
- Decided: 22 March 1917
- Citation: [1917] AC 309

Court membership
- Judges sitting: Lord Finlay LC; Earl Loreburn; Lord Dunedin; Lord Atkinson; Lord Shaw of Dunfermline

Keywords
- Qualified privilege

Adam v Ward [1917] AC 309 was a 1919 House of Lords case concerning the legal theories of qualified privilege and that of the constitutional defence. Qualified privilege is "a defence to the publication of defamatory statements which may be false but which warrant protection from an action in defamation because the occasion on which they are made demands that they be made freely with the prospect of litigation removed." The constitutional defence varies from country to country in that it is based on the constitutional law of said country.

The main point of the case concerned the distribution of information; specifically, whether defamatory truths can be published or are unable to be published (as is the case with defamatory lies), and whether such situations are privileged. I.e. if said action were performed out of malice or not, if it were, the case would be that the situation was not privileged and the person undertaking said action did not have the privilege to do so. Lord Atkinson ruled:

... a privileged occasion is ... an occasion where the person who makes a communication has an interest or a duty, legal, social, or moral, to make it to the person to whom it is made, and the person to whom it is so made has a corresponding interest or duty to receive it. This reciprocity is essential.

== Facts ==
The plaintiff, Major William Augustus Adam, was an officer in the 5th Royal Irish Lancers. In 1906, as a result of unfavourable confidential reports by superior officers, the Army Council requested his resignation from the Army, failing which he would be removed by the King. Major Adam appealed the decision, without success, and was placed on half-pay along with four other officers until 1910, when he was returned as Member of Parliament for Woolwich and left the Army.

On 27 June 1910 Adam made a speech in the House of Commons in which he referred to the case of a fellow officer who had been placed on half-pay at the same time and under similar circumstances. In the speech, he accused Major-General H. J. Scobell of having issued deliberately misleading confidential reports. The Army Council issued a letter to Scobell clearing him of the charges made by Adam, which were 'without foundation'. The letter was also released to the press.

Adam issued proceedings for libel against Sir Edward Ward, secretary of the Army Council, who had signed the letter. The defendant admitted that the letter was defamatory, but pleaded privilege. A special jury sitting with Darling J. found that the publication of the letter was not privileged, and found £2,000 in damages against the defendant. The decision was reversed by the Court of Appeal, which found that privilege applied.

== House of Lords ==
The House of Lords agreed with the Court of Appeal and dismissed the appeal.

== Later uses of the ruling ==
In Reynolds v Times Newspapers Limited and Others, 1999, Lord Atkinson's quote was cited to define what a privileged occasion is.
