= 1902 Woolwich by-election =

UK Parliamentary by-election

The 1902 Woolwich by-election was a Parliamentary by-election held on 25 April 1902. The constituency returned one Member of Parliament (MP) to the House of Commons of the United Kingdom, elected by the first past the post voting system.

The seat had become vacant following the resignation of the incumbent Conservative MP, Edwin Hughes due to ill health. Hughes vacated his Parliamentary seat by being appointed Steward of the Chiltern Hundreds on 18 April 1902. Hughes had been Member of Parliament for the constituency since the 1885 general election.

== Candidates ==
The Conservative candidate was Lord Charles Beresford. He had served as Member of Parliament for County Waterford from 1874 to 1880, for Marylebone East from 1885 to 1889, and for City of York from 1898 to 1900. He had been second in command of the Mediterranean Fleet from January 1900 to February 1902.

Contemporary press reports suggested Frank Hugh O'Donnell would stand as a Liberal candidate. O'Donnell had been Home Rule Member of Parliament for Dungarvan from 1877 to 1885. However, in the end no Liberal candidate stood.

== Result ==
The date for nominations was set for Friday 25 April and polling day for Wednesday 30 April. As only one candidate was nominated, there was no poll.

1902 Woolwich by-election
Party	Candidate	Votes	%	±%
Conservative	Charles Beresford	Unopposed		
Registered electors		15,376		
Conservative hold				
