= Will Crooks =

British trade unionist and politician (1852–1921)

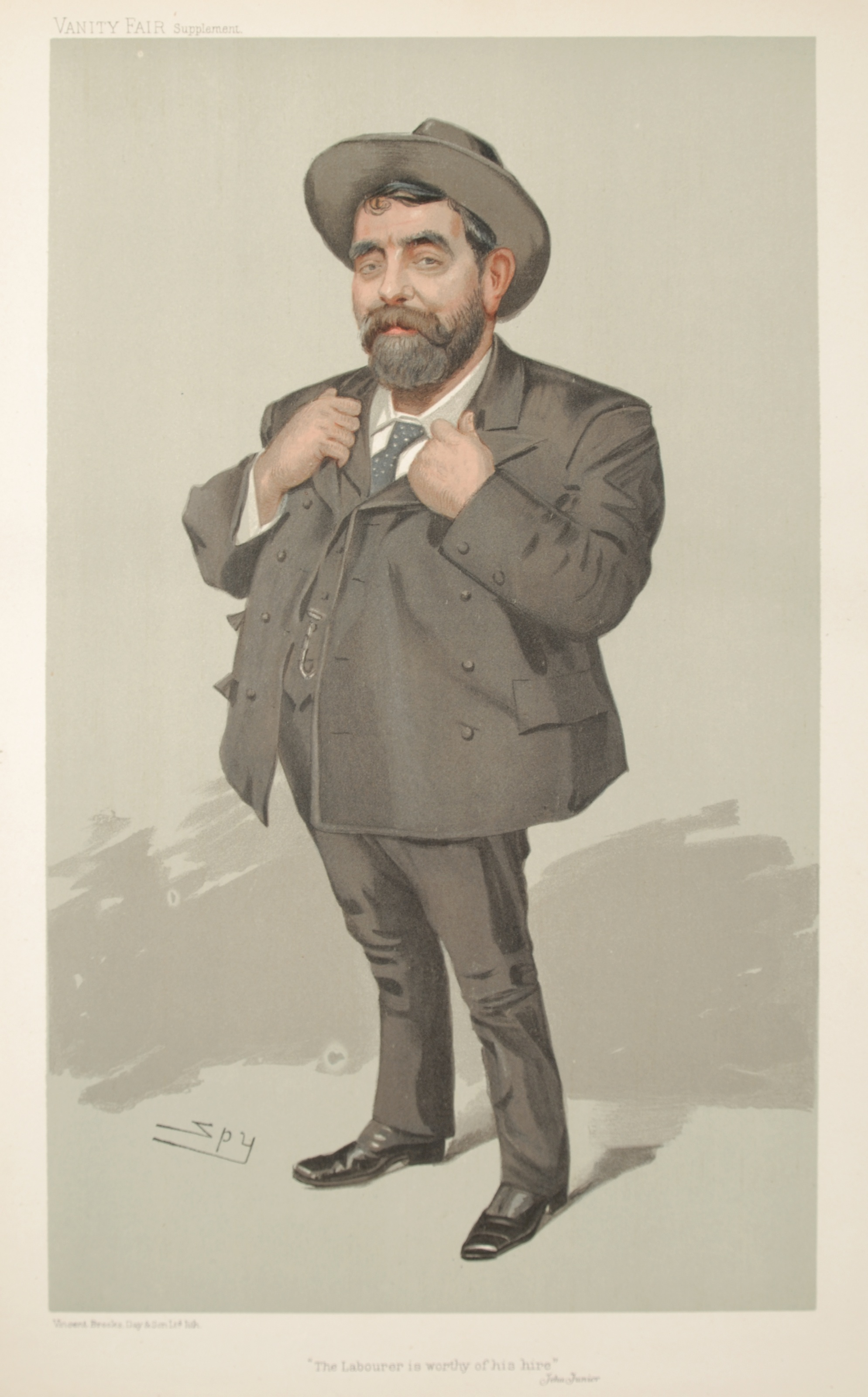
Vanity Fair caricature by Spy (Leslie Ward), 6 April 1905.

William Crooks (6 April 1852 – 5 June 1921) was a noted trade unionist and politician from Poplar, London, and a member of the Fabian Society. He is particularly remembered for his campaigning work against poverty and inequality.

== Early life ==
Born in Shirbutt Street, Poplar, Crooks was the third son of a ship's stoker, George Crooks, who lost his arm in an accident when Crooks was three years old. His mother, Caroline Elizabeth (née Coates), then supported the family by working as a seamstress, but money was scarce and five of the children were temporarily forced to enter Poplar workhouse in 1861. This experience had a profound influence on Crooks's views on poverty.

Educated at a local poor law school, Crooks worked initially as a grocer's errand boy, then a blacksmith's labourer and then as an apprentice cooper. A keen reader, Crooks learned about reformers such as Richard Cobden and John Bright, and was asked by his fellow workers to speak out about their working conditions. Consequently, he was sacked for being a political agitator. He remained a member of the Coopers Union from 1867 until his death in 1921.

== Working men union ==
After a short spell working in Liverpool, Crooks returned to London and found work in the docks. He developed his speaking skills outside the gates to the East India Docks. He also began to give political lectures, and his speaking abilities proved helpful in raising funds for 10,000 striking dockers in the 1889 London Dock Strike. Earlier that year, Crooks, a candidate for the Progressive Party, became one of the first labour members on the London County Council, and subsequently became the first working-class member, and later chairman, of the Poplar Board of Guardians. With support and help from friend and fellow member George Lansbury, Crooks set about reforming the local workhouse, creating a model for other poor law authorities.

A prominent local politician, he helped bring about many local improvements. In 1891 he "warmly endorsed" representation by the London Trades Council to restrict immigration. On 3 August 1895, Crooks formally opened Island Gardens, a park at the south end of the Isle of Dogs, opposite Greenwich Hospital. He also campaigned for the first Blackwall Tunnel, and as Chairman of the LCC Bridges Committee in 1898, he helped provide the Greenwich and Woolwich foot tunnels (completed in 1902 and 1912 respectively).

== Labour politician ==
Crooks (fifth from left) in 1906, with other leading figures in the party

In 1900 Crooks became the first Labour mayor of Poplar, and two years later was elected to Parliament as MP for Woolwich wresting the seat away from the Conservative Party in a massive electoral victory exceeding expectations. This success was the result of a pact between the Labour Representation Committee and the Liberal Party; his selection as prospective parliamentary candidate had been criticised by the Independent Labour Party. At the time, he was only the fourth Labour MP (preceded by James Keir Hardie, Richard Bell and David Shackleton; Arthur Henderson followed later in 1903).

As an MP, he retained his working-class roots and contacts, campaigned hard for workers' pensions, supported reforms to limit the powers of the House of Lords, and supported Balfour's Unemployment Bill in 1905, as well as supporting his wife in seeking the right for women to obtain the vote. Re-elected in 1906, he supported the reforming Liberal governments of Campbell-Bannerman (1906–1908) and Asquith (1908–1910). Crooks lost his seat in Parliament at the January 1910 general election, but was re-elected at the December 1910 general election

In 1911 he fell out with the Trades Union Congress over support for the Labour Disputes Bill. In 1912 he supported the Feeble-Minded Persons (Control) Bill; Crooks has been quoted by the New Statesman as describing disabled people as "like human vermin" who "crawl about doing absolutely nothing, except polluting and corrupting everything they touch". The full quote is:

"I have taken part, in discussions in this House on the unemployable; I have taken Members in authority on both sides and shown them 300 or 400 men not one of whom would be privately employed by any person for anything at all, not even for their keep. These were formerly mentally defective children who had been allowed to drift about the world, and to become absolutely useless. There is only one fitting description; they are almost like human vermin. They crawl about, doing absolutely nothing, except polluting and corrupting everything they touch. We talk about the liberty of the subject. What nonsense! What waste of words! We ask that you should take these people and have proper control over them, because they have no control over themselves. They are verminous, dirty, with no idea of washing or cleansing themselves. Yet they are human beings, and you could, under proper control, so far improve them that they could be put to some employment, not enough to keep them—I never expect that—but sufficient to maintain themselves partly, and to give them a human existence which they have not got now. Above everything else, you would stop the supply of these children—a very important thing."

As a member of the Metropolitan Asylums Board he helped to raise the age the Board was required to look after those with a Developmental Disability from 16 to 21, and increased the teaching and training of those in its care.

On 18 September 1914, following the outbreak of World War I, Crooks led the House of Commons in singing the national anthem, and unlike pacifist colleagues in the Labour Party he supported the war efforts of the government. In 1916 he was one of the Labour MPs to form part of the executive of Viscount Milner's 'patriotic Labour' British Workers League (BWL). Under pressure from the Labour Party he resigned from the BWL at the end of 1917. In 1918 he was returned unopposed for the new Woolwich East constituency.

He remained an MP until ill-health forced his retirement in February 1921. He died in the London Hospital, Whitechapel four months later, and was buried in Tower Hamlets Cemetery.

== Legacy ==
In 1930, one of the Woolwich Ferry paddle-steamers was named in his memory (taken out of service in 1963). A council housing estate in his native Poplar still bears his name, as does a road in Eltham, just south of Woolwich.

== Gallery ==
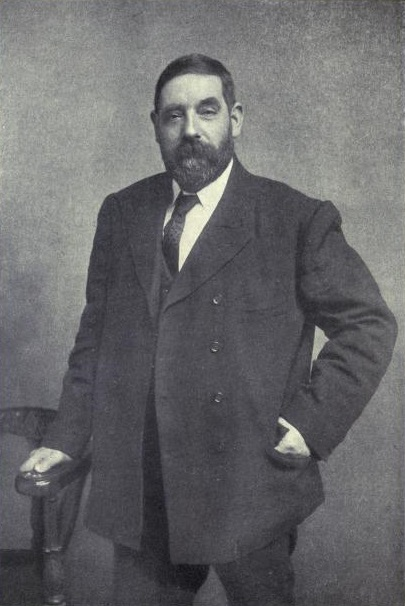
Picture of Will Crooks,
by G. Dendry

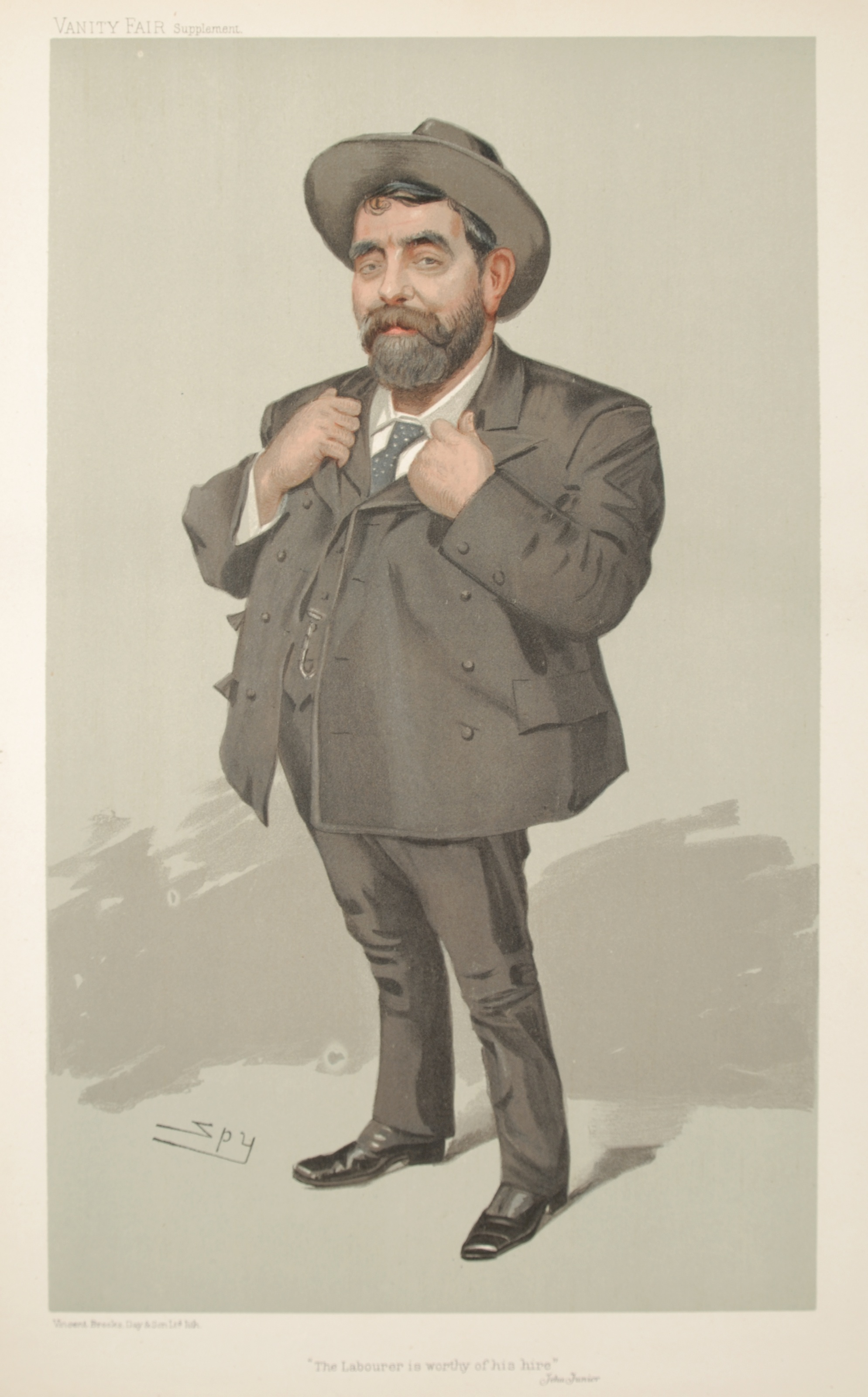
"The Labourer is worthy of his hire."
Crooks as caricatured by "Spy," (Leslie Ward) in Vanity Fair, April 1905.

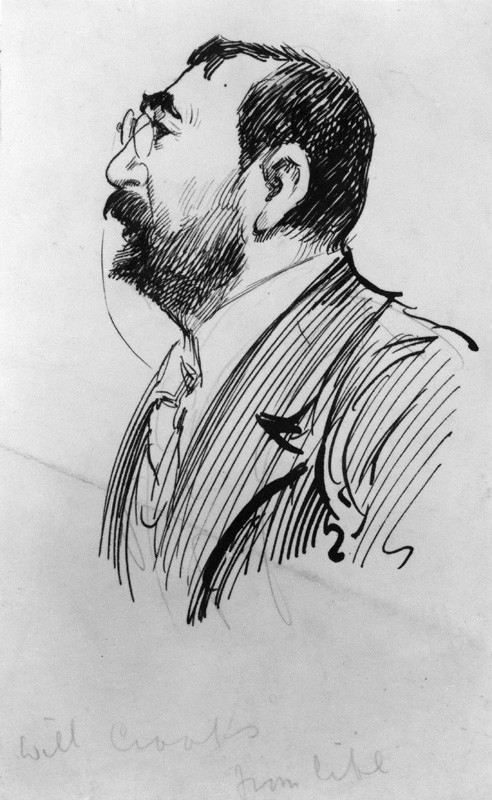
Will Crooks, by Harry Furniss, pen and ink, 1880s–1900s

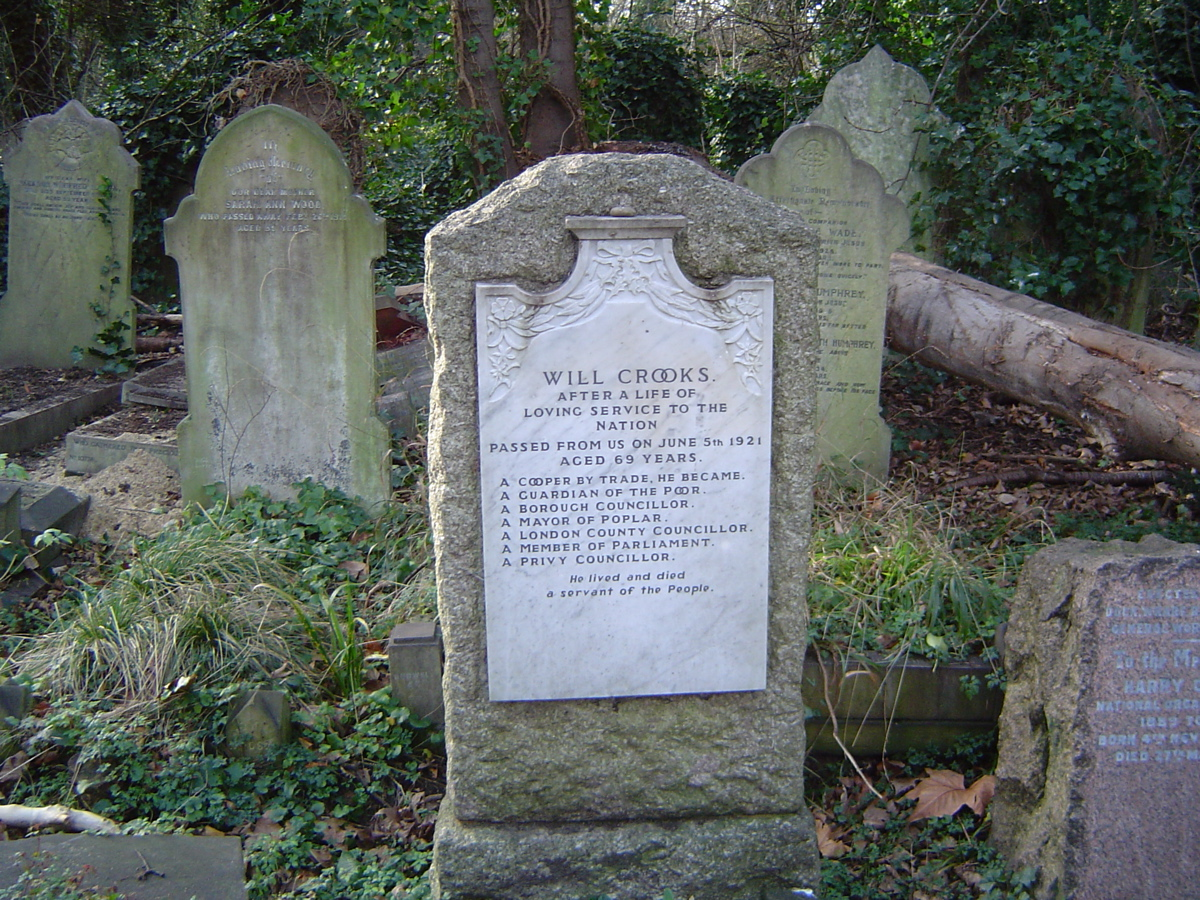
Memorial stone at Tower Hamlets Cemetery

Parliament of the United Kingdom
Preceded by Lord Charles William de la Poer Beresford	Member of Parliament for Woolwich; 1903–January 1910	Succeeded by William Augustus Adam
Preceded by William Augustus Adam	Member of Parliament for Woolwich; December 1910–1918	Constituency abolished
New constituency	Member of Parliament for Woolwich East; 1918–1921	Succeeded by Robert Gee
