= John Cartwright (British politician) =

British politician (1933–2024)

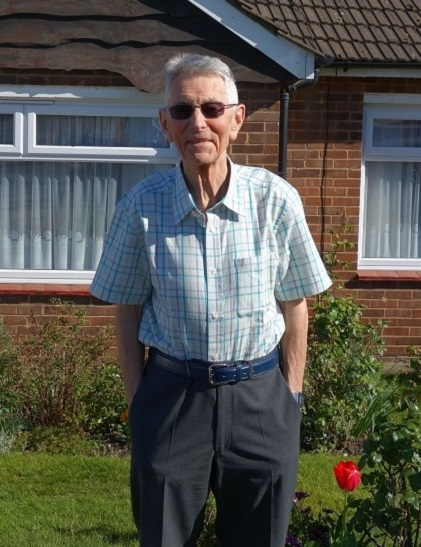
- Cartwright in 2012

President of the Social Democratic Party
- In office 29 August 1987 – 16 July 1988
- Leader: Robert Maclennan
- Preceded by: Shirley Williams
- Succeeded by: Ian Wrigglesworth (as Liberal Democrats President)

Chief Whip, Social Democratic Party
- In office 9 June 1983 – 16 July 1988
- Leader: David Owen
- Preceded by: John Roper
- Succeeded by: Jim Wallace (as Liberal Democrats Chief Whip)

Member of Parliament for Woolwich Woolwich East (1974–1983)
- In office 10 October 1974 – 16 March 1992
- Preceded by: Christopher Mayhew
- Succeeded by: John Austin

Personal details
- Born: 29 November 1933 Lincoln, England
- Died: 18 November 2024 (aged 90)
- Party: Labour (1955–81); SDP (1981–88) 'Continuing' SDP (1988–90); Independent (since 1990)

John Cameron Cartwright (29 November 1933 – 18 November 2024) was a British politician. He was a Labour and then an SDP Member of Parliament (MP) representing Woolwich East then Woolwich from the October 1974 general election to the 1992 election.

== Early life and education ==
Cartwright was born in Lincoln, England on 29 November 1933. He was educated at Monks Road Council School, Lincoln and Woking County Grammar School, he was the star of the grammar school's Dramatic Society, for which he played numerous Shakespearean and Goldsmithian ladies. One such production was seen by the Norwegian ambassador, who was so impressed that he invited the whole production to perform in Oslo and Bergen.

== Political career ==
Initially an executive officer in the Home Civil Service, Cartwright's political career began when he became a constituency agent for the Labour Party in 1955. Serving twelve years in that role, he was later employed as political secretary of the Royal Arsenal Co-operative Society (R.A.C.S.) and as a councillor in Greenwich, where he became the Labour Group leader and, subsequently, leader of the council from 1971 to 1974. He unsuccessfully contested Conservative-represented constituencies at the 1970 and February 1974 general elections: first losing at Bexley to Tory leader Edward Heath, subsequently prime minister, then losing at Bexleyheath to Cyril Townsend. At the October 1974 election Cartwright was elected as the Labour member for Woolwich East, replacing Christopher Mayhew, who had left Labour to join the Liberal Party the year before.

Following six years as a backbench member of parliament and latterly Parliamentary Private Secretary to Shirley Williams, Cartwright himself left the Labour Party in 1981 to become a founding member of the SDP. He served as the SDP's chief whip from 1983 onwards and as its president from 1987. He also served as the SDP–Liberal Alliance's chief defence spokesman from 1983 to 1987. A close political ally of David Owen, he stayed loyal to Owen's 'continuing' SDP after the Liberal Party and a majority of the SDP merged in January 1988 to become the Liberal Democrats.

After the collapse of the continuing SDP in 1990, Cartwright stood for re-election as an Independent Social Democrat, albeit one endorsed by the Liberal Democrats, but lost by 2,200 votes.

== Later life and death ==
After leaving active politics he went on to serve as deputy chairman of the Police Complaints Authority before retiring to Kent.

After suffering from a series of falls, Cartwright died on 18 November 2024, at the age of 90.

== Sources ==
- Leigh Rayment's Historical List of MPs

Parliament of the United Kingdom
Preceded by Christopher Mayhew	Member of Parliament for Woolwich East; 1974–1983	constituency abolished
New constituency	Member of Parliament for Woolwich; 1983–1992	Succeeded by John Austin-Walker
Party political offices
Preceded by Arthur Skeffington	Socialist societies representative on the Labour Party National Executive Committee; 1971–1975	Succeeded by Tom Jones
Preceded by Tom Jones	Socialist societies representative on the Labour Party National Executive Committee; 1976–1978	Succeeded by Les Huckfield
Preceded by Shirley Williams	President of the Social Democratic Party; 1987–1988	Succeeded by Ian Wrigglesworth; President of the Liberal Democrats; Himself; President of the continuing Social Democratic Party
