= John Austin (politician) =

British politician

Member of Parliament for Erith and Thamesmead Woolwich (1992–1997)
- In office 9 April 1992 – 12 April 2010
- Preceded by: John Cartwright
- Succeeded by: Teresa Pearce

Personal details
- Born: 21 August 1944 (age 82) Blaby, Leicestershire, England
- Party: Labour

John Eric Austin (born 21 August 1944), formerly Austin-Walker, is a British Labour Party politician who served as the Member of Parliament (MP) for Woolwich from 1992 to 1997 and for Erith and Thamesmead from 1997 to 2010.

== Early life ==
He attended the Glyn Grammar School for Boys (now called Glyn School) on The Kingsway in Epsom. Austin gained a Certificate in Community and Youth Work from Goldsmiths College in 1972 and a Master of Arts in Policy Studies from the University of Bristol in 1990. He worked as a medical laboratory technician from 1961 to 1963, a Labour Party organiser from 1963 to 1970, a social worker in Bexley from 1972 to 1974 before becoming Director of Bexley Council for Racial Equality until 1992.

Austin became a councillor for the London Borough of Greenwich in 1970, and was leader of the council from 1982 to 1987, when he became mayor for two years. He stepped down as a councillor in 1994.

== Parliamentary career ==
Austin stood for the seat of Woolwich at the 1992 general election, and won it from independent John Cartwright with a majority of 2,225. The constituency boundaries for the area were re-drawn for 1997 general election, and Austin won the new seat of Erith and Thamesmead with a majority of 17,424.

Austin served as a member of the Health Select Committee from 1994 until 2005. He served on the Parliamentary Joint Committee on Human Rights.

In May 2005 Austin threatened to stand as a stalking horse candidate against Tony Blair. He intended to trigger a leadership election at the party conference in September 2005 if Blair himself did not do so by resigning as leader. He indicated his hope that, in the event of a contest, Gordon Brown would enter and win. However he was unable to accumulate the number of required nominations from fellow MPs to force a contest.

Austin, a member of the left-wing Socialist Campaign Group, announced his retirement in July 2008. He told a meeting of the General Council of the Erith & Thamesmead Constituency Labour Party that he would not run again at the next general election.

Austin was implicated in the 2009 MPs' expenses scandal, he claimed a total of £133,000 in second home allowances since 2001, despite the fact the two London flats he lived in over the period were just over 10 miles away from his main residence in Kent. However Austin has said his claims had been reasonable and within the rules.

He is a patron of various organisations including Humanists UK (formerly known as the British Humanist Association), Peace in Kurdistan Campaign and Palestine Solidarity Campaign.

== Personal life ==
Austin lists his interests as running, cookery, and gardening. He married Linda in 1965. They have two sons Damien and Toby and a daughter Zoe, and divorced in 1988. Zoe gave him three grandchildren, Felix, Matilda and Kitty. Toby has given him three grandsons and a granddaughter, Jake, Cameron, Ziggy and Daisy. Damien has two sons, Shay and Osin.

On 15 September 2010, Austin, along with 54 other public figures, signed an open letter published in The Guardian, stating their opposition to Pope Benedict XVI's state visit to the UK.

Parliament of the United Kingdom
Preceded by John Cartwright	Member of Parliament for Woolwich; 1992–1997	Constituency abolished
New constituency	Member of Parliament for Erith and Thamesmead; 1997–2010	Succeeded by Teresa Pearce
