= William Augustus Adam =

British politician (1865–1940)

- Born: 27 May 1865
- Died: 18 October 1940 (aged 75)
- Education: Harrow School; Trinity College Dublin; Royal Military Academy, Sandhurst
- Occupations: British Army Officer and politician

William Augustus Adam (27 May 1865 – 18 October 1940) was a British Army officer and Conservative Party politician.

He was born with the surname "Adams" but later changed his name.

== Biography ==
Adam was educated at Harrow School, Trinity College Dublin, and Royal Military Academy, Sandhurst. Adam was a member of the 5th Royal Irish Lancers of the British Army, and fought in the Second Boer War and First World War, and reached the rank of major. He fought on the Japanese side in the Russo-Japanese War.

In 1906, the Army Council decided that Major Adam should be made to retire, owing to his unsuitability as a cavalry leader. Those events would later give rise to the litigation in Adam v Ward.

He was elected as Member of Parliament (MP) for Woolwich in the January 1910 general election, but was defeated in the second election that year.

Parliament of the United Kingdom
Preceded by Will Crooks	Member of Parliament for Woolwich; January 1910 – December 1910	Succeeded by Will Crooks
