= Lord Charles Beresford =

Royal Navy admiral (1846–1919)

Admiral The Right Honourable The Lord Beresford GCB GCVO FRSGS
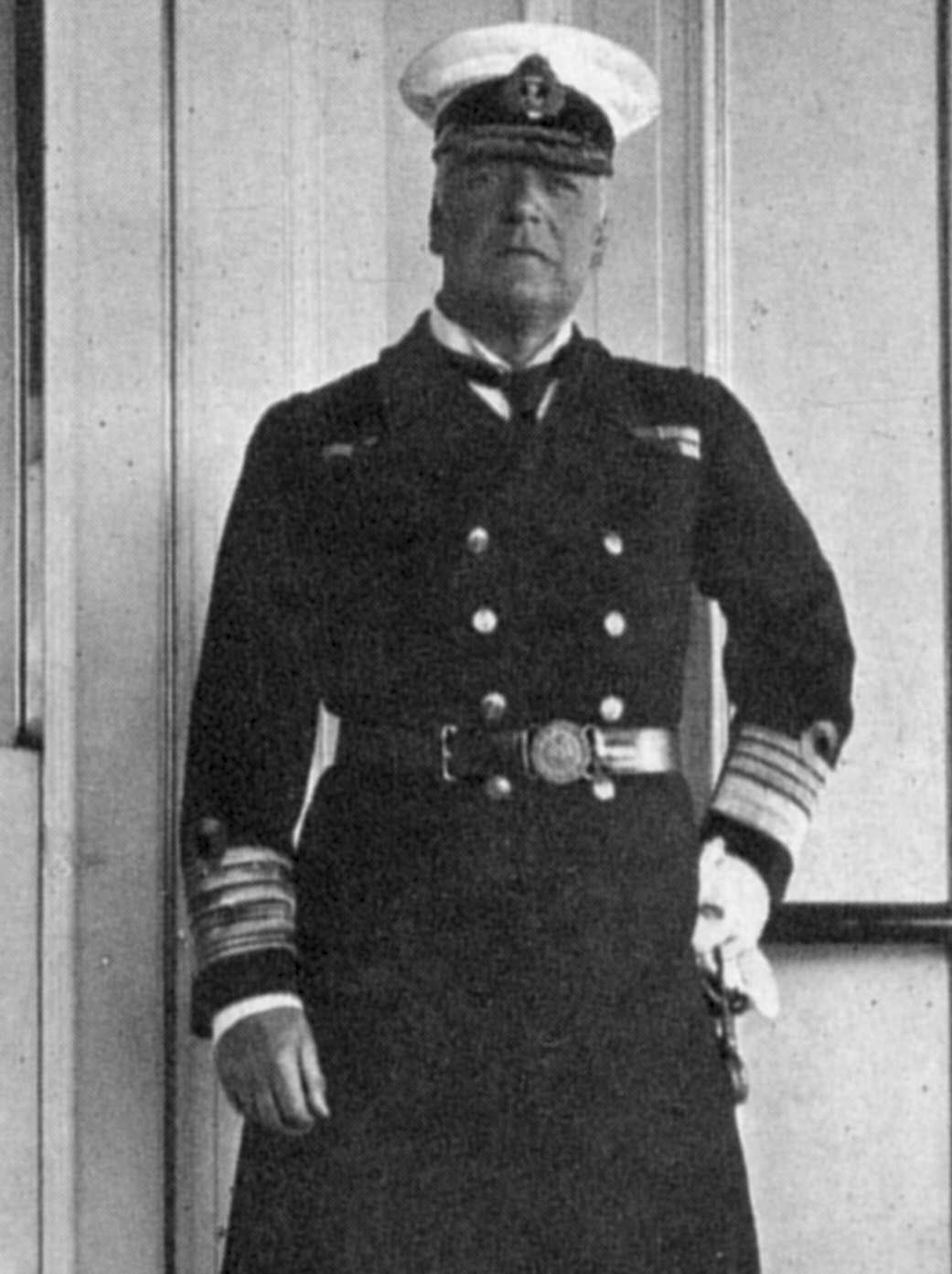
- Beresford, as pictured in Queen Alexandra's Christmas Gift Book, distributed for charity

Personal details
- Born: 10 February 1846 Curraghmore, County Waterford, Ireland
- Died: 6 September 1919 (aged 73) Berriedale, Caithness, Scotland
- Party: Conservative
- Spouse: Ellen Jeromina Gardner
- Awards: Knight Grand Cross of the Order of the Bath; Knight Grand Cross of the Royal Victorian Order

Military service
- Allegiance: United Kingdom
- Branch/service: Royal Navy
- Years of service: 1859–1911
- Rank: Admiral
- Battles/wars: Urabi Revolt; Gordon Relief Expedition

Admiral Charles William de la Poer Beresford, 1st Baron Beresford, GCB, GCVO, FRSGS (10 February 1846 – 6 September 1919), styled Lord Charles Beresford between 1859 and 1916, was a British admiral and Member of Parliament.

Beresford was the second son of John Beresford, 4th Marquess of Waterford, thus despite his courtesy title as the younger son of a Marquess, he was still eligible to enter the House of Commons. He combined the two careers of the navy and a member of parliament, making a reputation as a hero in battle and champion of the navy in the House of Commons. He was a well-known and popular figure who courted publicity, widely known to the British public as "Charlie B". He was considered by many to be a personification of John Bull, indeed was normally accompanied by his trademark, a bulldog.

His later career was marked by a longstanding dispute with Admiral of the Fleet Sir John Fisher, over reforms championed by Fisher introducing new technology and sweeping away traditional practices. Fisher, slightly senior to Beresford and more successful, became a barrier to Beresford's rise to the highest office in the navy. Beresford rose to occupy the most senior sea commands, the Mediterranean and Channel fleets, but failed in his ambition to become First Sea Lord.

== Family life and character ==
Beresford was born in Philipstown (Daingean), King's County (now known as County Offaly), and grew up in Curraghmore, Ireland, the second of five brothers. His older brother John joined the Life Guards, succeeding to the family estate and titles in 1866 on the death of their father. William joined the 9th Queen's Royal Lancers, was awarded the VC in the Anglo-Zulu War and became military secretary to several viceroys of India. Marcus joined the 7th Queen's Own Hussars, became an equerry to King George V and in charge of the King's racehorses. The youngest brother, Delaval, became a rancher in Canada.

The Beresfords traced their ancestry to an English officer serving in Ireland during the reign of James I. They subsequently married into the de la Poer family (Lady Catharine Power) who were of Norman origin and owned Curraghmore, hence their surname de la Poer Beresford. Their estate covered 100,000 acres (400 km^{2}) at Curraghmore near Waterford in south east Ireland, had stables for 100 horses and employed 600 people. The family enjoyed hunting, to the extent that his uncle was killed in a riding accident, his brother was crippled in another, and he himself managed ten broken bones at various times.

Beresford had a reputation for kindness to his men, saying "Any smart action performed by an officer or man should be appreciated publicly by signal ... Everyone is grateful for appreciation". At 46 and as captain, he took part in inter-ship rowing competitions.

He married Ellen Jeromina (Mina) Gardner, daughter of Richard Gardner and Lucy Mandesloh, on 25 June 1878 at London, England. They had two daughters, Kathleen Mary de la Poer Beresford (1879–1939) and Eileen Theresa Lucy de la Poer Beresford (1889–1939).

== Naval and political career ==
Beresford had been captivated by the sight of the Channel Fleet at age twelve, and joined the Royal Navy in 1859 aged 13, following preparatory education at Stubbington House School. He started his training as a cadet at the naval training academy HMS Britannia, successfully completing his passing-out examination in March 1861. He was immediately appointed a midshipman on the flagship of the Mediterranean fleet, the steam three-decker HMS Marlborough. Beresford described Marlborough as "the smartest and happiest ship that ever floated". Beresford left Marlborough in early 1863, and was appointed to HMS Defence in the summer of 1863. Defence was one of four new ironclads serving in the Channel Squadron; Beresford was unhappy in Defence, which he described as "a slovenly, unhandy tin kettle, which could not sail without steam...and which took minutes instead of seconds to cross topgallant yards". Beresford got into debt, his father consulted Admiral Eden, who arranged for Beresford's transfer in mid-1864 to the steam-corvette HMS Clio, where Beresford would be the senior midshipman, which it was hoped would develop his sense of responsibility.

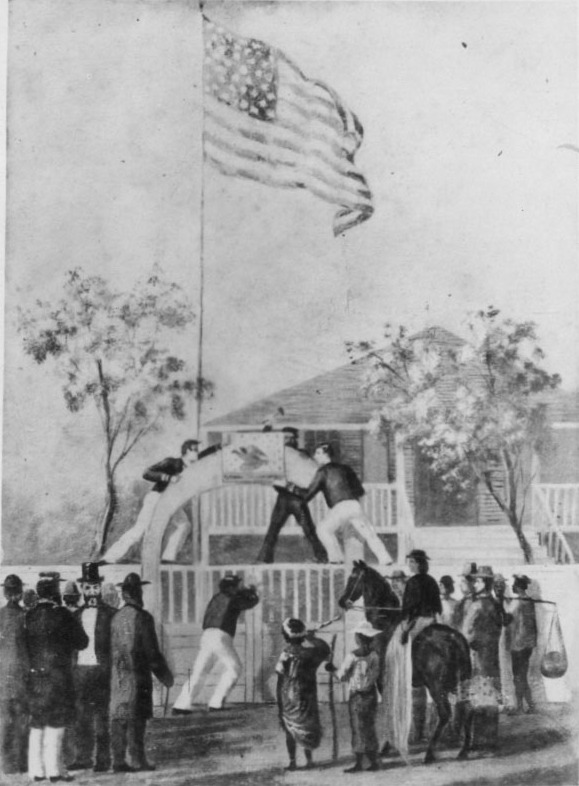
Beresford and Lord Gordon restoring the coat of arms over the United States Legation at Honolulu, 1865

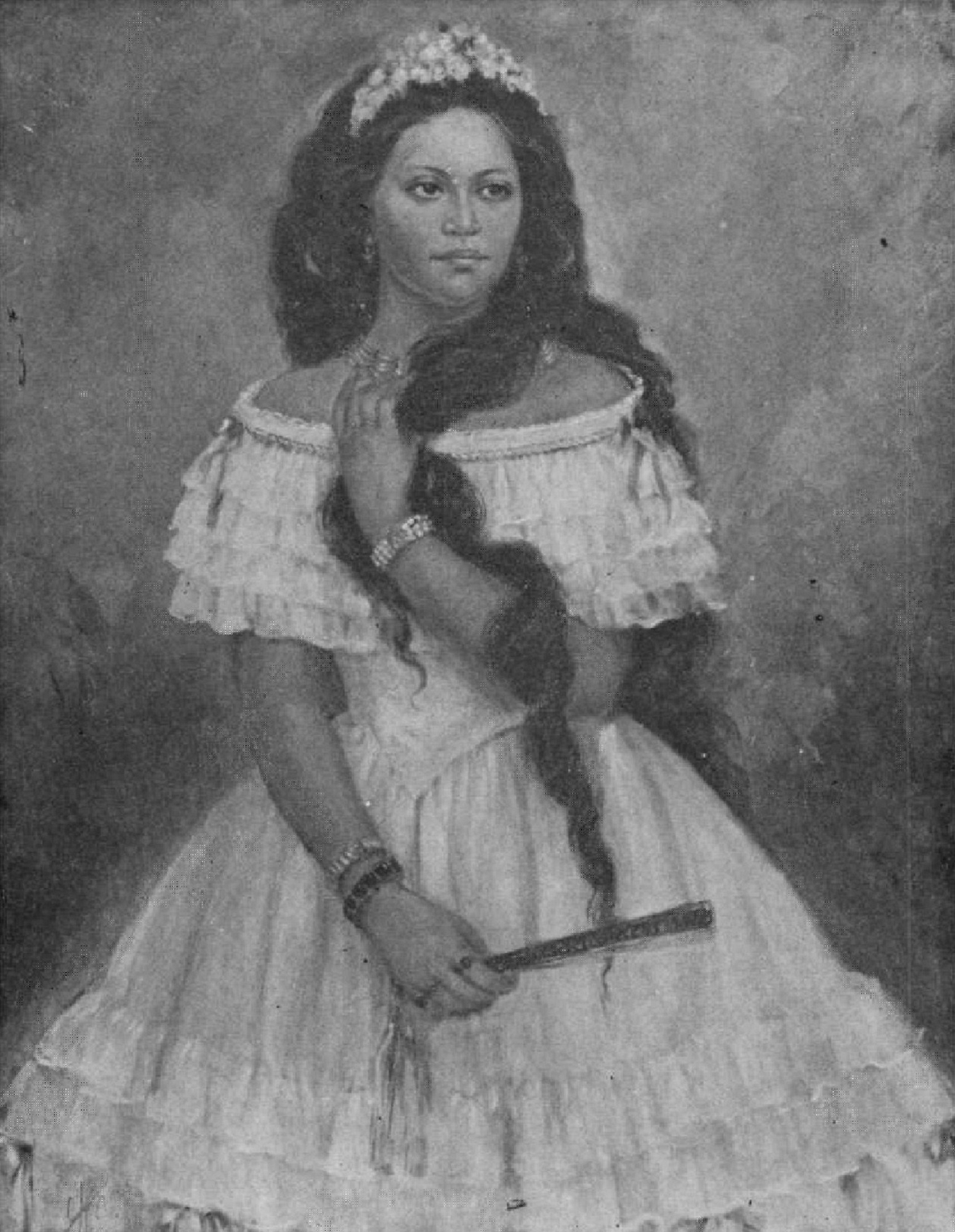
Nancy Sumner, c. 1859

On 9 April 1865 Clio visited the Kingdom of Hawaii (then known as the Sandwich Islands) to escort Dowager Queen Emma to Panama for her visit to London. On the evening of 21 April Beresford and two other midshipmen pulled a prank and stole a wooden American eagle sign from the gate of the legation of United States Minister to Hawaii James McBride. Following the sign's discovery by their superior officer Captain Nicolas Edward Brook Turnour and a formal diplomatic demand to return the sign by the American legation, they were ordered to apologize to the Americans, return and reinstall the sign the next day. The event was negatively reported in American newspapers including Harper's Weekly. Beresford later claimed he did it because of a bet from a fair lady in Honolulu. It was in Honolulu where Beresford first met Nancy Wahinekapu Sumner, one of Queen Emma's court ladies. Beresford and Sumner became friends, and continued their friendship through correspondence. Later in 1865, Beresford was transferred to the steam-corvette HMS Tribune, which was commanded by Lord Gilford and was one of the smartest ships in the navy at the time. Beresford was promoted to acting sub-lieutenant in January 1866. A month later Beresford was transferred to the steam-frigate HMS Sutlej, the flagship of the Pacific Squadron. Beresford passed his seamanship examination to qualify for lieutenant on board Sutlej, which he left later in 1866. Beresford did a gunnery course on Excellent (shore establishment), a hulk in Portsmouth Harbour. Beresford broke a bone in his foot whilst dismounting a gun on Excellent, an injury that caused him pain for the rest of his life. Beresford joined HMS Research still as a sub-lieutenant in 1867, and then in the summer of 1868 was one of the sub-lieutenants on the royal yacht Victoria and Albert. Beresford joined the steam-frigate HMS Galatea, commanded by Queen Victoria's son the Duke of Edinburgh, and toured the world, witnessed executions in Japan and got tattooed. On a visit to the Kingdom of Hawaii in 1869, Beresford met Nancy Sumner again. He proposed to her, but she refused likely due to their social and racial differences.

He entered Parliament as a Conservative in 1874, representing County Waterford and retained his seat until 1880. Some difficulties arose with the Lords of the Admiralty, who objected to a junior officer debating the navy publicly in the House of Commons. Beresford's parliamentary career was saved by the intervention of the Prime Minister, Benjamin Disraeli, who feared the loss of the seat to an opposition party, should Beresford be forced to resign. Whilst an MP he continued to serve in the navy, becoming a commander in 1875.

In 1874, Beresford was one of thirty-two aides chosen to accompany the Prince of Wales on a tour of India. Victoria objected, on the grounds of his bad reputation, but he remained at the Prince's insistence. The tour was a lively mixture of social engagements and animal hunts. The Prince insisted on dressing for dinner, even in the jungle, but allowed the concession of cutting off the tails of their evening coats, creating the dinner jacket. He was aide-de-camp to the Prince of Wales, later Edward VII, from 1875 until 1876.

In 1891 Beresford's affair with Daisy Greville, Countess of Warwick (i.e., Frances Brooke) resulted in a serious dispute with the Prince of Wales. A letter written by the Countess to Beresford came into the possession of Beresford's wife. She lodged the letter with solicitor George Lewis and threatened to use this to destroy the reputation of the Countess. The Prince of Wales, who had a special affection for the Countess, tried to have the letter destroyed but Lewis would not allow this. The Prince of Wales then took steps to exclude Lady Charles from his social circle. An angry Charles Beresford eventually extracted a written apology from the Prince. The Prince subsequently wrote to Lord Waterford (Beresford's brother) saying that he "can never forget, and shall never forgive, the conduct of your brother and his wife towards me".

Two of the Countess of Warwick's children were allegedly fathered by Beresford. Marjorie Blanche Greville (1884–1964), born three years after her marriage to the Earl of Warwick, was Daisy's second child. The Countess, in a 1923 conversation with Basil Dean, stated that Marjorie was fathered by Beresford. The third, Charles Algernon Brooke (1885–1887), who died aged 16 months, may also have been fathered by Beresford.

=== Involvement in Egypt and Sudan ===
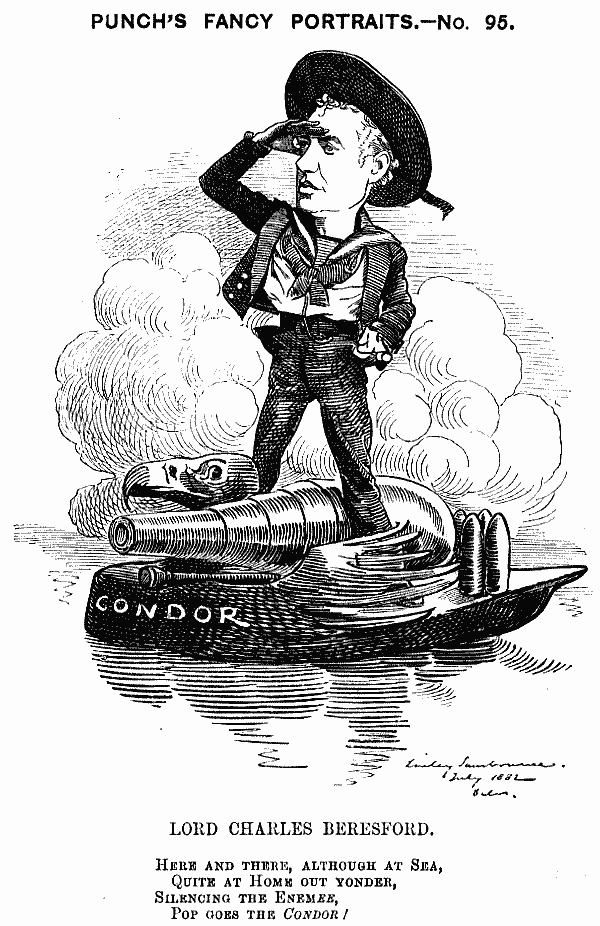
Caricature from Punch, 1882

From 1878 until 1881 Beresford was second in command of the royal yacht HMY Osborne. He was captain of the gunboat HMS Condor in 1882 when it took part in the Bombardment of Alexandria during the Egyptian war of 1882 and won admiration amongst the British public for taking his ship inshore to bombard the Egyptian batteries at close range.

In 1884 and 1885 Beresford joined the staff of the Gordon Relief Expedition under Garnet Wolseley, along with the Naval Brigade and a Gardner machinegun, to which Beresford was much attracted. During the Battle of Abu Klea, Dervishes overran his Gardner gun when it jammed at the last moment. Beresford just escaped death by diving under the trail of the gun. Henry Newbolt's Abu Klea poem "Vitaï Lampada" is often quoted, "The Gatling's jammed and the Colonel's dead...", although it was a Gardner machine gun which jammed.

=== Re-election to Parliament, promotion to rear admiral ===
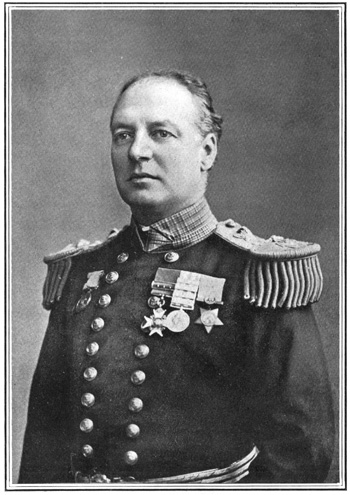
Beresford in dress uniform, late 1880s.

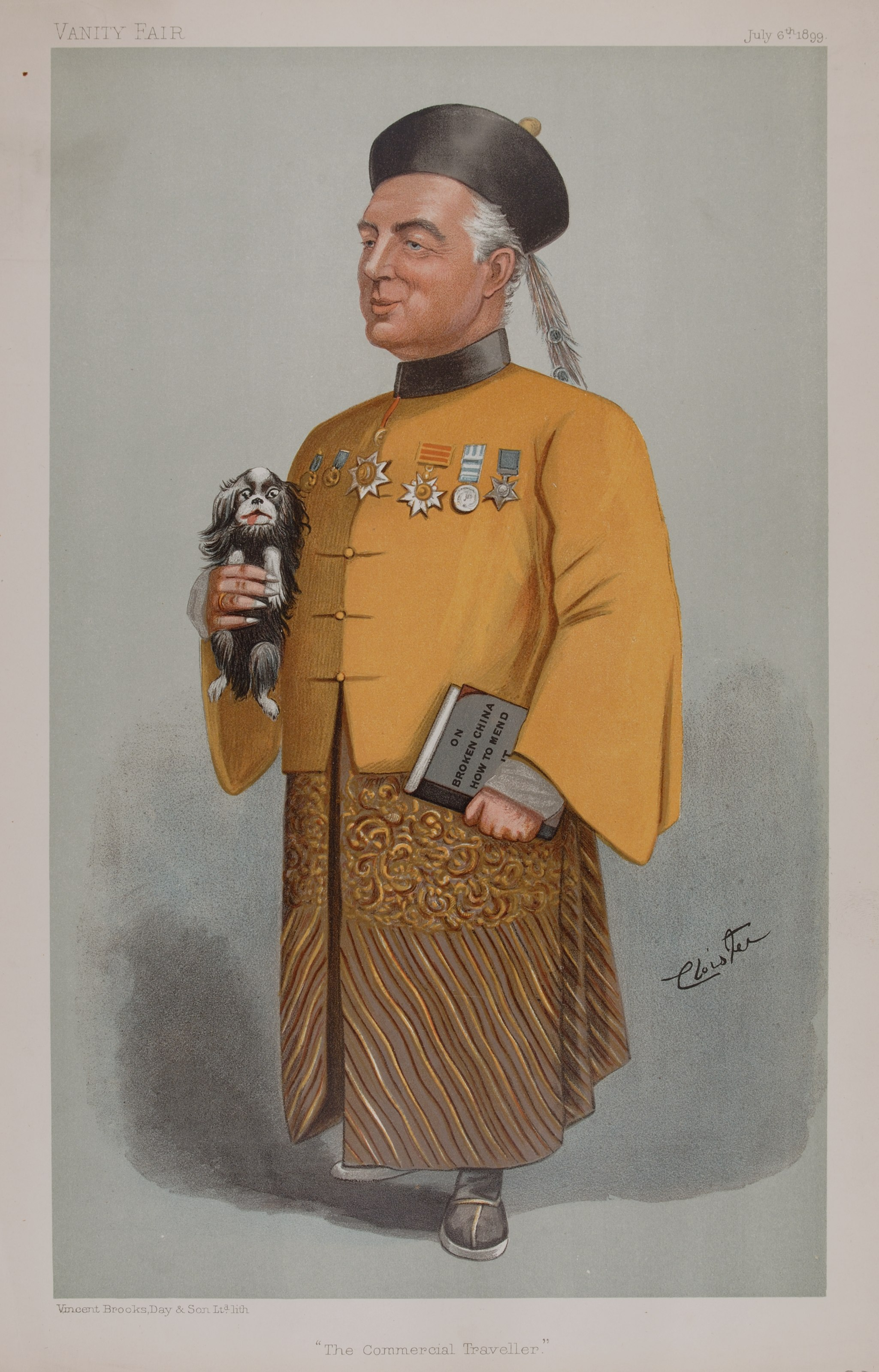
Beresford caricatured by Cloister for Vanity Fair, 1899

In 1885 he was again elected to Parliament, this time as MP for Marylebone East, and re-elected at the 1886 general election. Beresford constantly pushed for greater expenditure on the navy, resigning his seat in protest on this issue in 1889. Meanwhile, in 1886 he had also become Junior Naval Lord. The Naval Defence Act 1889, which increased naval spending, was passed partly as a result of public pressure resulting from this action.

Beresford was a believer in promoting physical recreation beyond the armed forces, being one of the founding committee of the National Physical Recreation Society which began in 1886 under the presidency of Herbert Gladstone. In 1888 he put down a motion in Parliament proposing that the County Councils (formed in 1889) provide a gymnasium for every 100,000 inhabitants. William Penny Brookes invited him to be president of the Wenlock Olympian Society Annual Games in Shropshire for the years 1888 and 1889 but he was unable to be present at the sports, because of other commitments. In the latter year news of his affair with the Countess of Warwick broke after she threatened Lady Charles Beresford; despite this Brookes, an advocate of physical education, and Beresford had a warm correspondence from 1888 until Brookes' death in 1895, and Beresford was elected an honorary member of the Wenlock Olympian Society in 1891.

In July 1889, Beresford resigned from the House of Commons for the first of four times by being appointed Crown Steward and Bailiff of the Chiltern Hundreds. (As of 2023 only four other MPs had resigned by becoming stewards of both the Chiltern Hundreds and the Manor of Northstead.) From 1889 until 1893 he was the captain of HMS Undaunted, which was part of the Mediterranean Fleet.

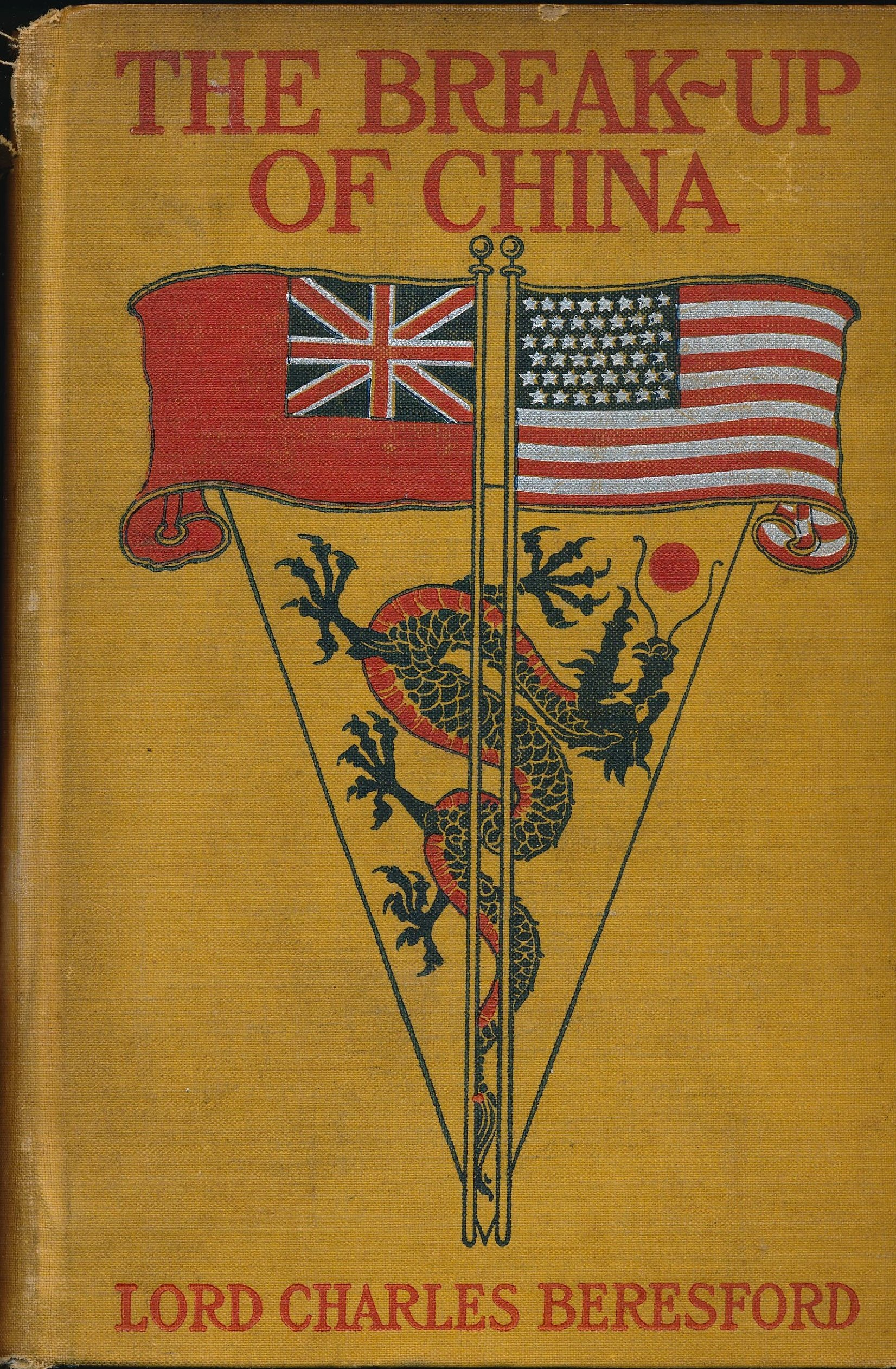
First edition of The Break-Up of China (1899) by Beresford

In 1898 Beresford was promoted to rear-admiral and again entered Parliament, this time representing York, though he spent much of his time in China representing the Associated Chambers of Commerce. He spent 100 days in China, and on his return to London, spent 31 days writing The Break-Up of China (1899). He resigned from the House of Commons for a second time in January 1900, becoming Crown Steward and Bailiff of the Chiltern Hundreds again, to become second in command of the Mediterranean Fleet, and left London to take up this position the following month. A dislike steadily developed between Beresford and Admiral Sir John Fisher, who was then commanding that fleet. Shortly after his arrival, Beresford took a company of men ashore and used them as stand-ins for ships to practice manoeuvring and assembling a fleet. Fisher noticed the display and publicly sent a signal demanding to know why Beresford had landed his men without permission. Lord Charles resented his superior as a social climber from unknown origins, while Fisher was jealous of Beresford's inherited wealth and social position. In early February 1902 he left his position in the Mediterranean Fleet and returned to England.

=== As admiral ===
Beresford was again elected to Parliament in April 1902, this time for Woolwich, and in October that year visited New York City. He was promoted to vice-admiral on 3 October 1902, and in February 1903 resigned from the Commons for a third time (this time becoming Crown Steward and Bailiff of the Manor of Northstead) when he was offered command of the Channel Fleet. He took up this position in April 1903 when he hoisted his flag on board HMS Majestic. Later that year he was knighted in both the Order of the Bath and the Royal Victorian Order, followed by promotion to GCVO in 1906 and GCB in 1911. Beresford was in command of the Mediterranean Fleet from 1905 until 1907. David Beatty, then a captain serving under Beresford, commented that Beresford's command of the fleet was characterised by 'rigid training and discouragement of initiative'. Beresford aspired to reach the navy's most senior post, First Sea Lord, but the position was held by Fisher, who was widely respected. Mandatory retirement at 65 would have led to Fisher departing in 1906, but Fisher's promotion to admiral of the fleet also brought with it an extension of retirement age to 70. Beresford himself would reach retirement at 65 in 1911, unless he too could achieve the same promotion. As this seemed unlikely, the only possibility was if Fisher resigned, or was obliged to. Beresford set about organising a campaign criticising his handling of the navy and its reforms.

Beresford transferred to command of the Channel fleet from 1907 to 1909. He was complimented by a then-junior officer as having 'no superior as a seaman', but his time in charge was described as 'principally a processional career around the ports of Britain ... I do not recall that any serious problems of war were either attempted or solved [but] Lord Charles received deputations, addressed crowded meetings in his honour, and became freeman of innumerable cities'.

Beresford is credited with recommending the use of Grimsby trawlers for minesweeping operations following visits he made to various East Coast ports in 1907. Grimsby, with its impressive docklands and trawler fleet was seen as ideal, with Beresford arguing that the fishing fleet would be inactive during times of war as fishing grounds became war zones. It was also thought that trawlermen would be more skilled than naval ratings with regards to the handling of the sizeable warps and winches that would be required for minesweeping as they were already accustomed to using them with the working of the trawl. In the First World War the boats provided the craft, the trawler fleet the crew, and the port a base for the Royal Naval Patrol Service.

It was noted that his personality seemed to have changed for the worse, and historians have suggested that he might have suffered a minor stroke at some time before 1907. In 1907 and 1908, there were two incidents involving Admiral Percy Scott, commander of the 1st Cruiser Squadron of the Channel Fleet. In November 1907, Beresford ordered all ships of the Channel Fleet then at sea to return to harbour to be repainted for a review by the Kaiser. The armoured cruiser HMS Roxburgh was engaged in gunnery practice at Portland, and its captain requested permission to finish the exercise before returning to harbour. Scott refused, signalling "Paintwork appears to be more in demand than gunnery, so you had better come in in time to make yourself look pretty by the 8th". Nothing happened for four days, until a staff officer visiting Scott's flagship heard of the signal and reported it to Beresford, who summoned and severely reprimanded Scott without giving Scott an opportunity to explain his remarks and actions, and refused to listen when Scott tried to offer an explanation. Beresford then asked the Admiralty to relieve Scott of his command, writing that Scott's signal was "totally opposed to loyalty and discipline...contemptuous in tone, insubordinate in character and wanting in dignity." The Admiralty did not comply, although they expressed their disapproval of Scott's signal. In 1908, Scott disobeyed an order from Beresford which would have resulted in a collision.

After his term with the Channel Fleet finished in 1909, Beresford returned to Parliament at the January 1910 general election, representing Portsmouth. During his spell as commander of the Channel Fleet Beresford had become increasingly critical of Admiralty policy, in particular the organisational reforms instituted by Fisher. In April 1909, he wrote a letter to H. H. Asquith, the Prime Minister, expressing his discontent and threatening to express his concerns in public; Asquith responded by setting up a sub-committee of the Committee of Imperial Defence to report on the matter. This upheld Admiralty policy, but sufficient damage was done to Fisher's reputation that he was obliged to retire slightly early, in 1910, in anticipation of a forthcoming general election.

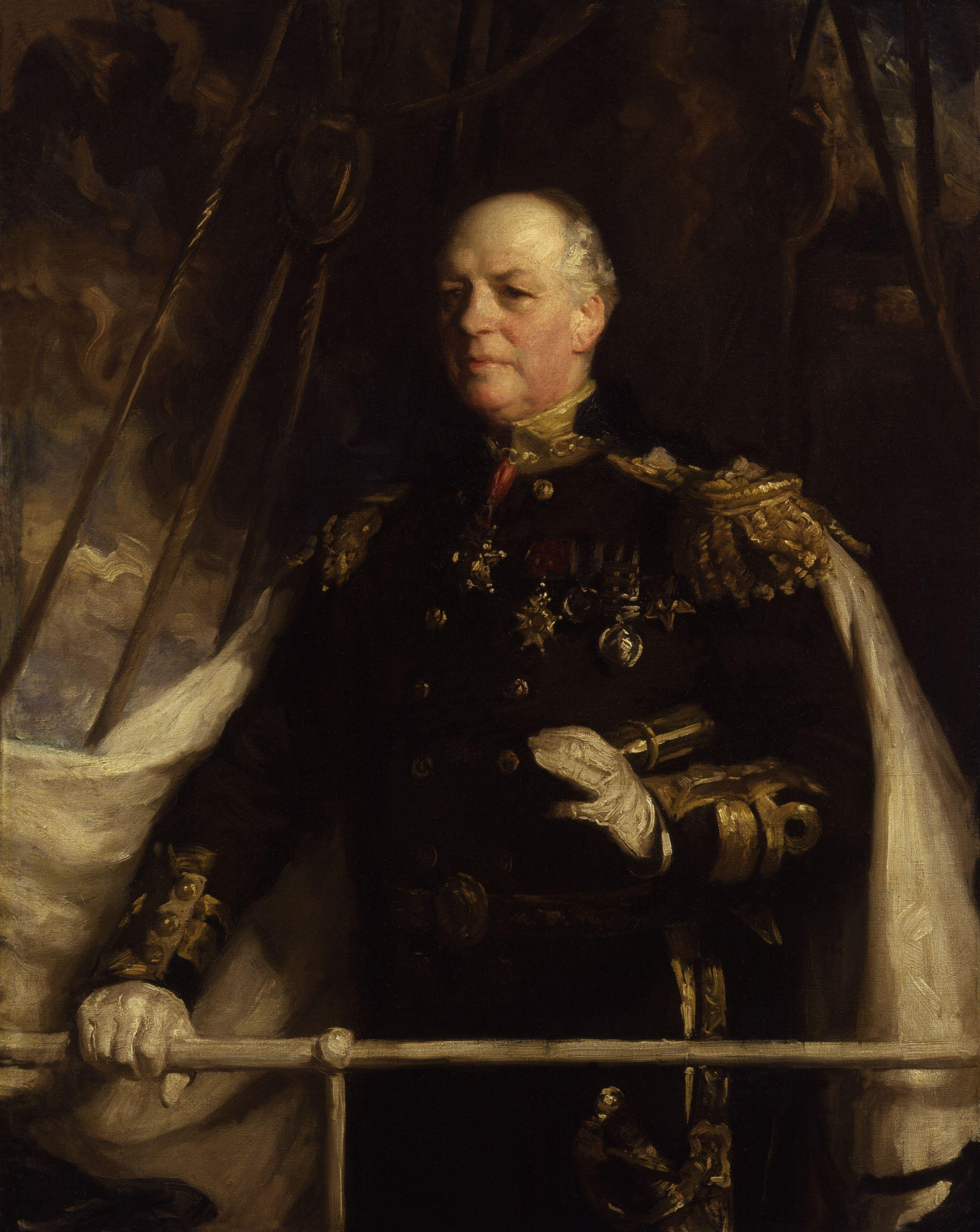
Beresford painted by Charles Wellington Furse

In 1912, it was proposed by George V, who knew Beresford, that he might be promoted admiral of the fleet, but it fell to Beatty, now Naval Secretary to First Lord Winston Churchill to point out that others would be more deserving of such a promotion. He was later, in 1914, appointed an Honorary Colonel in the Royal Marines. Beresford had been somewhat left behind by the technological innovations and changes in the navy during the last years of his service as an admiral. It is likely that he would have performed poorly had he continued as an admiral into the First World War. However, at times during his career he supported proposals to reform the fleet signal book, which, it has been claimed, might have made it more suitable for wartime use, and had championed reforms in fire control, where understanding of how best to use the new big guns on Fisher's dreadnought ships allegedly lagged behind their ability to hit at long ranges.

Fisher was succeeded as First Sea Lord in January 1910 by Sir Arthur Wilson, followed in 1911 by Sir Francis Bridgeman. Bridgeman proved to be unsatisfactory, and Churchill resolved to replace him with the Second Sea Lord, Prince Louis of Battenberg. Beresford questioned the matter of Bridgeman's resignation, officially said to be for reasons of ill health, by challenging Churchill in the House of Commons. Churchill responded, saying of Beresford that "since I became first lord of the admiralty...within a fortnight he made a speech in which he said I had betrayed the navy...and ever since he has been going about the country pouring out charges of espionage, favouritism, blackmail, fraud, and inefficiency... The noble Lord nourishes many bitter animosities on naval matters". The House of Commons supported Churchill, considering that Beresford's attack was a continuation of his dispute with Fisher, who was now acting privately as advisor to Churchill.

On the eve of the First World War, First Lord Churchill and First Sea Lord Prince Louis of Battenberg made the crucial decision to cancel the scheduled dispersal of the British fleet following practice manoeuvres, to preserve the Royal Navy's battle readiness. Nonetheless, with the outbreak of war, rising anti-German sentiment among the British public, newspapers, and elite gentlemen's clubs (where resentment was inflamed by Beresford despite Churchill's remonstrances) drove Churchill to ask Prince Louis to resign as on 27 October 1914, which Louis did amidst an outpouring of appreciation from politicians and his naval comrades.

Beresford remained an MP until 1916, after he retired from the navy in 1911. In January 1916, he resigned from the Commons for the fourth and final time, again becoming Crown Steward and Bailiff of the Manor of Northstead, and was raised to the peerage as Baron Beresford of Metemmeh and of Curraghmore in the County of Waterford. In October 1910, The Boy Scouts Association established a Sea Scout Branch and Beresford accepted the post of Chief Sea Scout. Together with Warington Baden-Powell, he devised the training scheme for the new section.

== Death and funeral ==
Lord Beresford died in 1919 at Langwell, Berriedale, Caithness, at the age of 73, at which point his title became extinct. After a ceremonial funeral at St Paul's Cathedral, he was buried at Putney Vale Cemetery, south London.

== Foreign honours ==
Besides his peerage, Lord Beresford also held a number of foreign honours:

- Grand Cordon of the Order of the Medjidie of the Ottoman Empire.
- Grand Cross of the Order of the Red Eagle of Prussia.
- Grand Cross of the Order of the Redeemer of Greece.
- Grand Cross of the Order of St Olav of Norway.
- Grand Cross of the Legion of Honour of France.

== See also ==
- The Souls

== Bibliography ==
- Bennett, Geoffrey (1969). Charlie B. Dawnay.
- Beresford, Charles (1914). The Memoirs of Admiral Lord Charles Beresford. Boston: Little, Brown, & Company.
- Burt, R. A. (1988). British Battleships 1889–1904. Annapolis, Maryland: Naval Institute Press. ISBN 0-87021-061-0.
- Freeman, Richard (2009). The Great Edwardian Naval Feud: Beresford's Vendetta Against 'Jackie' Fisher. Penn and Sword Military Press. ISBN 978-1-84884-083-6.
- Gordon, Andrew (1996). The Rules of the Game: Jutland and British Naval Command. London: John Murray.
- Hough, Richard (1984). Louis and Victoria: The Family History of the Mountbattens (Second ed.). London: Weidenfeld and Nicolson.
- Massie, Robert (1991). Dreadnought: Britain, Germany, and the Coming of the Great War. New York: Random House. ISBN 0-394-52833-6.
- Morris, Jan (1995). Fisher's Face. Harmondsworth, England: Viking (Penguin Books). ISBN 0-670-84345-8.

Military offices
Preceded by Sir James Erskine	Junior Naval Lord; 1886–1888	Succeeded by Sir Charles Hotham
Preceded by Sir Arthur Wilson	Commander-in-Chief, Channel Fleet; 1903–1904	Succeeded by Himself (as Commander-in-Chief, Atlantic Fleet)
Preceded by Himself (as Commander-in-Chief, Channel Fleet)	Commander-in-Chief, Atlantic Fleet; 1904–1905	Succeeded by Sir William May
Preceded by Sir Compton Domvile	Commander-in-Chief, Mediterranean Fleet; 1905–1907	Succeeded by Sir Charles Drury
Preceded by Sir Arthur Wilson	Commander-in-Chief, Channel Fleet; 1907–1909	Succeeded by Post disbanded
Parliament of the United Kingdom
Preceded by Sir John Esmonde; Henry Villiers-Stuart	Member of Parliament for County Waterford; 1874–1880; With: Sir John Esmonde, 1852–1876; James Delahunty, from 1877	Succeeded by Henry Villiers-Stuart; John Aloysius Blake
New constituency	Member of Parliament for Marylebone East; 1885–1889	Succeeded by Edmund Boulnois
Preceded by Sir Frank Lockwood; John Butcher	Member of Parliament for City of York; 1898–1900; With: John Butcher	Succeeded by John Butcher; Denison Faber
Preceded by Edwin Hughes	Member of Parliament for Woolwich; 1902–1903	Succeeded by William Crooks
Preceded by Thomas Bramsdon and Sir John Baker	Member of Parliament for Portsmouth; 1910–1916; With: Bertram Falle	Succeeded by Sir Hedworth Meux and Bertram Falle
Peerage of the United Kingdom
New creation	Baron Beresford; 1916–1919	Extinct
