= Ben F. Jones =

American visual artist (born 1941)

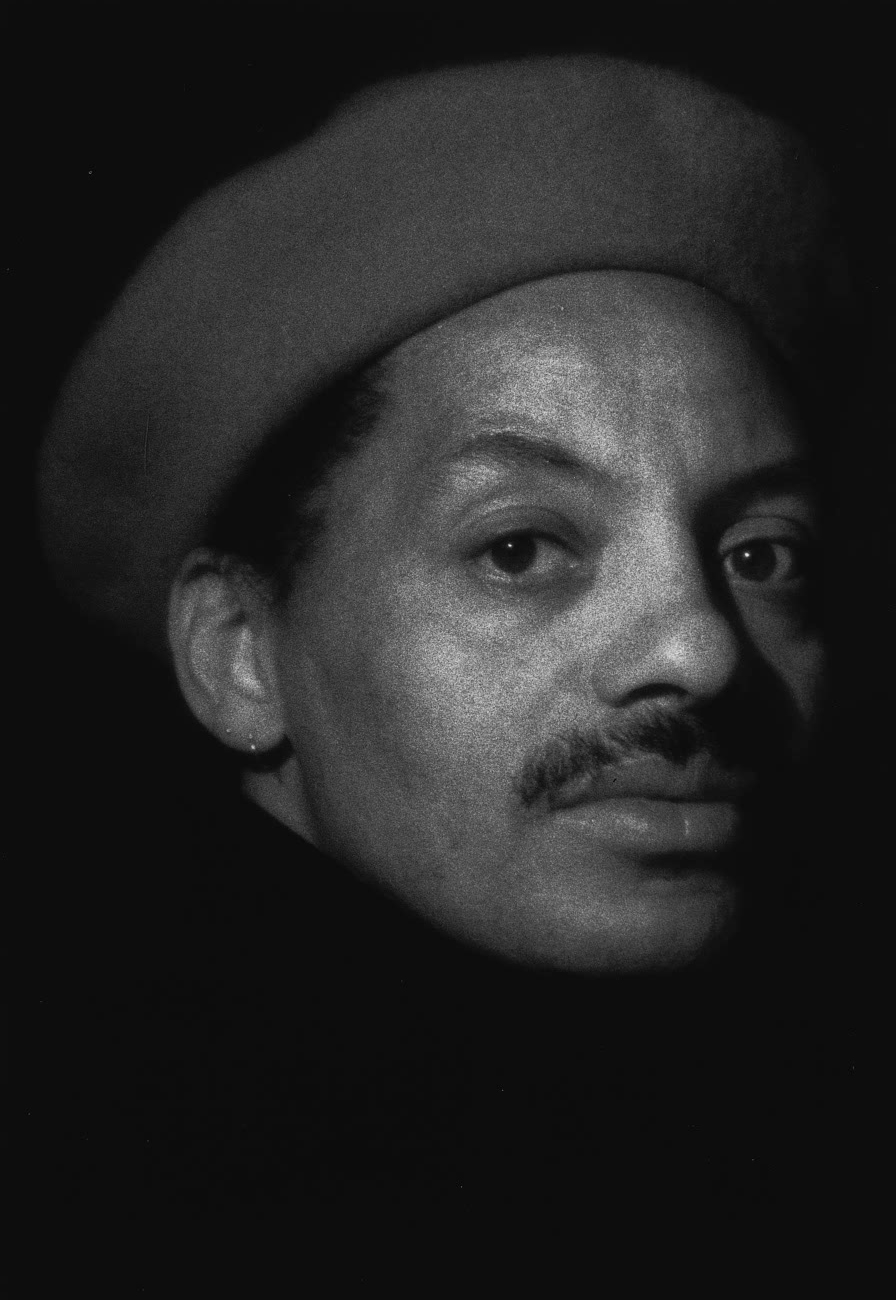
- Portrait of the artist as a young man
- Born: Benjamin Franklin Jones; 1941 (age 84–85); Paterson, New Jersey, U.S.
- Education: William Paterson University (BFA); New York University (MA); Pratt Institute (MFA)
- Occupations: Visual artist, educator, activist
- Website: benfjones.net

Benjamin Franklin Jones (born 1941) is an American visual artist, educator, and activist, whose creative career spans six decades. His multimedia artworks draw on his travel and research in Africa, Europe, South America, the United States and the Caribbean; most notably, he has made more than fifty cultural exchange visits to Cuba since the 1970s. His works explore his African-American heritage, African spiritualism and ritual, as well as jazz and soul music, reflecting his engagement with the Black Arts Movement.

As art historian Eddie Chambers observes, "Ben Jones has established himself as perhaps one of the most respected senior figures of contemporary African-American art, whose practice emerged in the artistically, culturally and politically turbulent period of the late 1960s, and continued, with notable rigour and constantly maturing creativity, through the decades right up to the present time."

== Biography ==
Benjamin Franklin Jones was born in 1941 in Paterson, New Jersey, United States. He has said that, being from a family of 15 children, with relatives constantly visiting: "As a little boy, I found myself drawing them all the time and by the age of 8 or 9, I was regularly doing drawings of the family. One day at school my teacher said 'You can draw!' and I just enjoyed doing what I was doing and carried on."

He received a BFA degree from William Paterson University (formerly Paterson State Teachers College), an MA from New York University and an MFA from Pratt Institute.

Jones has lectured worldwide at educational and cultural institutions, among which are Harvard University, Howard University, Savannah College of Art and Design, Wifredo Lam Center (Havana, Cuba) and the University of Ghana.

In honor of his life-long commitment to youth art education and diversity in the arts, the Ben Jones Scholarship Fund was set up by Montclair Art Museum, "for students with financial need to have transformative experiences through exposure to fine art and opportunities to advance their skills, explore their creative voice, build portfolios and personal connections in the arts, and increase confidence and self-esteem."

He is the subject of the 2018 documentary film The Art of the Journey: The Ben F. Jones Story.

He expresses through his work his activist belief that "everything connects"; interviewed following the opening of a 2021 dual show with William Rhodes, Making Visible the Connections, at the California Institute of Integral Studies' Desai Matta Gallery, Jones said: "Racism, social justice, environmentalism, spirituality. … we have to see the connection between social justice and protecting the environment and working for equality."

Works by Jones are held in the permanent collections of major institutions, including The Studio Museum in Harlem, Brooklyn Museum, Museum of Modern Art in New York, New Jersey State Museum, Montclair Art Museum, and Museo Nacional de Bellas Artes of Havana.

In August 2025, Jones was in conversation with museum leader Jennifer Francis as the closing event of the London exhibition Carnivalesque – Body, Mind and Spirit (curated by Onyekachi Wambu), ahead of the UK premiere at the 198 Gallery in Brixton of the 50-minute documentary film directed by Souleyman Garcia, The Bigger Picture: Visions of Ben Jones.

== Selected exhibitions ==
Jones has held a large number of solo shows in the United States and internationally since the 1970s, including exhibitions at the Studio Museum in Harlem (1973), Howard University (1976), Newark Museum (1984), Rene Portocarrero Gallery, Havana, Cuba (1993), and over the decades in England, France, Brazil, Italy, Spain, Germany, and South Africa.

A major retrospective entitled "Deliverance": The Art Of Ben Jones 1970–2008 was mounted in 2008 at the Jersey City Museum, curated by Ed Spriggs, and accompanied by a documentary video. Art critic Benjamin Genocchio reviewed the show for The New York Times, observing that Jones had "chosen to spend the better part of his career making art according to imperatives that have nothing to do with artistic fashion. That takes dedication. The second revelation is that he has produced many memorable, thought-provoking images that deserve to be a lot better known and appreciated."

In 2022, a new exhibition by Jones entitled The Bigger Picture was on show at the 198 Gallery in Brixton, London, featuring paintings, digital work, video and installation. As reviewer Leslie Manasseh stated: "Here you will see images and narratives of the major challenges facing the world such as racism and racial violence, poverty and inequality, environmental destruction, and the oppression of the poor and dispossessed. Their structure is complex and decoding the works takes time. But that's what Jones intends. He wants to make you think. And then he wants you to act."

His 2024 exhibition The Universe of Ben Jones reflects the focus of his career on interconnections between issues such as capitalism, the environment, and racism, displaying "how Jones's symbology has transcended global and local issues of ecology, technology, politics, and spirituality, making him the conscience of his generation and of today."

== Selected publications ==
- 2008: With Amiri Baraka (ed.), The Art of Ben Jones 1970–2008 "Deliverance", ISBN 978-0979113017.
- 2011: The Art of Ben Jones: Evolution – Revolution, 2011 – accompanying exhibition at Rich Mix Centre for the Arts, London, England.
