= Ben Jones (musician) =

English singer-songwriter (born 1982)

- Origin: Maidstone, England
- Genres: pop, indie pop
- Instruments: Guitar, piano, hammond organ, bass guitar, mandolin, ukulele, harmonica, drums
- Years active: 2001-present
- Label: Toulouse Records
- Website: www.beatrootrevival.com

Ben Jones (born 14 November 1982) is an English singer, songwriter, musician and producer living in Austin, Texas, and was a founder member of The Lovedays. and The Rifle Volunteers. He has released two completely solo albums, as well as albums with The Lovedays and The Rifle Volunteers. His most recent releases are as part of the duo, Beat Root Revival, with Andrea Magee

== Background ==
Ben Jones was born in Minster, on the Isle of Sheppey, Kent, attending Minster College. In 1995 he began playing the guitar, having taught himself, and has obsessively picked up a few more instruments along the way. His first band, "Carters England" made one self-titled, self released album in 2005. He formed The Lovedays in 2009, recording two LPs and an EP, They toured the UK and America in 2010. This was followed by 2 solo albums, "Echobox", and "Kaleidoscope", before forming a new band, Ben Jones and The Rifle Volunteers, releasing 2 albums together. In 2014, undertaking a 3-month solo tour of the US, Ben joined another singer/songwriter, Andrea Magee, to form Beat Root Revival. They released their debut album, Waiting on A Miracle, on Toulouse Records in December 2014, followed by their second album, Beat Root Revival in September 2016.

== Echobox ==
Echobox was Ben's first solo album, played and produced by him alone. It was recorded at Ranscombe Studios, Rochester, Kent. It featured 12 songs, and was reviewed highly favourably by BBC Introducing, citing it as "an undeniable triumph for a multitalented musician". It was re-released on Toulouse Records in 2014.

== Kaleidoscope ==
Ben's second solo album, Kaleidoscope, featured 11 new songs and was self released in 2011, before being re-released by Toulouse Records in 2014.

== Discography ==
Carters England

- Carters England (CD release November 2005, Loveday Recordings)

The Lovedays

- The Lovedays (CD release November 2008, 208 Records)
- The Lovedays – Red Letter Day EP (CD release March 2009, 208 Records)
- The Lovedays – House of Cards (CD release February 2010, 208 Records)

Ben Jones

- Echobox (digital release July 2010, 208 Records)
- Kaleidoscope (digital and CD release January 2011, 208 Records)

Ben Jones and The Rifle Volunteers

- Shangri-La (CD release June 2013)
- Shangri-Live! (Live CD release January 2014)

Beat Root Revival

- Waiting on a Miracle (CD release December 2014, Toulouse Records)
- Beat Root Revival (CD release September 2016)
