= Woolwich (UK Parliament constituency) =

UK Parliament constituency (1983–1997)

- Former borough constituency for the House of Commons

1885–1918
- Seats: One
- Created from: Greenwich
- Replaced by: Woolwich East and Woolwich West

1983–1997
- Seats: One
- Type of constituency: Borough constituency
- Created from: Woolwich East
- Replaced by: Erith & Thamesmead, and Greenwich & Woolwich

Woolwich was a borough constituency represented in the House of Commons of the Parliament of the United Kingdom from 1885 to 1918 and from 1983 to 1997. It centred on Woolwich, now in the Royal Borough of Greenwich in south-east London.

Will Crooks, Member of Parliament for Woolwich 1903–10 and 1910–18, was one of the first Labour MPs in the United Kingdom.

== History ==
In 1918, the seat was split into Woolwich East and Woolwich West. In 1983, most of Woolwich West became Eltham while the recreated Woolwich constituency was largely based on Woolwich East. In 1997, the seat was split up along different lines, with part of it going into neighbouring Erith and Thamesmead, and part of it merging with the Greenwich seat to form the new Greenwich and Woolwich seat.

== Boundaries ==
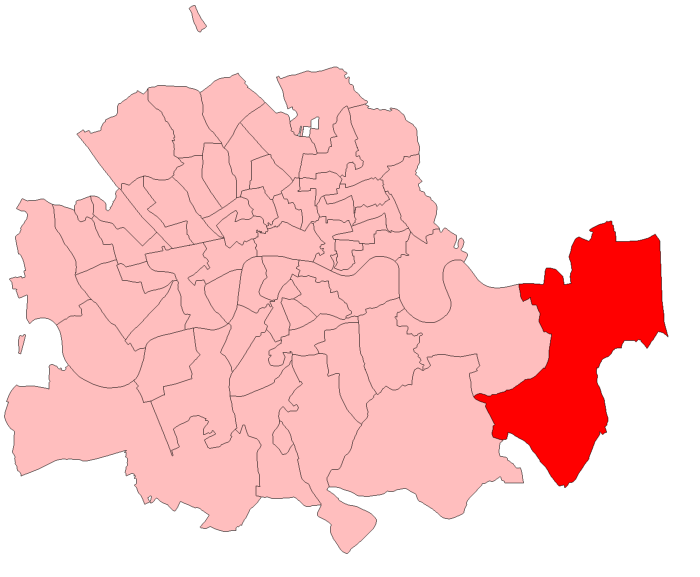
Woolwich in the Metropolitan Board of Works area, showing boundaries used from 1885 to 1918.

1885–1918: The parishes of Woolwich, Eltham and Plumstead.

Woolwich, showing boundaries used from 1983 to 1997.

1983–1997: The London Borough of Greenwich wards of Abbey Wood, Arsenal, Burrage, Eynsham, Glyndon, Lakedale, Plumstead Common, St Mary's, St Nicholas, Shrewsbury, Slade, Thamesmead Moorings, and Woolwich Common.

== Members of Parliament ==
=== MPs 1885–1918 ===
Election	Member	Party
1885	Edwin Hughes	Conservative
1902 by-election	Lord Charles Beresford	Conservative
1903 by-election	Will Crooks	Labour
1910 (January)	William Augustus Adam	Conservative
1910 (December)	Will Crooks	Labour
1918	Constituency divided. See Woolwich East and Woolwich West	

=== MPs 1983–1997 ===
Election	Member	Party	Notes
1983	John Cartwright	SDP	Formerly Labour MP for Woolwich East.
1988	John Cartwright	'Continuing' SDP	Formerly Labour MP for Woolwich East.
1990	John Cartwright	Independent Social Democrat	Formerly Labour MP for Woolwich East.
1992	John Austin-Walker	Labour	
1997	Constituency abolished. See Erith & Thamesmead, and Greenwich & Woolwich		

== Elections ==
=== Elections in the 1990s ===
General election 1992: Woolwich
Party	Candidate	Votes	%	±%
Labour	John Austin	17,551	44.2	+7.2
Ind. Social Democrat	John Cartwright	15,326	38.6	–3.1
Conservative	Kevin Walmsley	6,598	16.6	–4.6
Natural Law	Sarah Hayward	220	0.6	New
Majority		2,225	5.6	+0.9
Turnout		39,695	70.9	+0.2
Registered electors		55,977		
Labour gain from Ind. Social Democrat		Swing	+5.2	

=== Elections in the 1980s ===
General election 1987: Woolwich
Party	Candidate	Votes	%	±%
SDP	John Cartwright	17,137	41.7	+1.2
Labour	John Austin	15,200	37.0	+3.6
Conservative	Anthony Salter	8,723	21.2	−3.9
Majority		1,937	4.7	−2.4
Turnout		41,060	70.7	+2.7
Registered electors		58,071		
SDP hold		Swing		

General election 1983: Woolwich
Party	Candidate	Votes	%	±%
SDP	John Cartwright	15,492	40.5	+32.3
Labour	Audrey Wise	12,767	33.4	–25.5
Conservative	Philomena Brown	9,616	25.1	–5.5
BNP	TC Fitz-Gerald	384	1.0	New
Majority		2,725	7.1	–21.1
Turnout		38,259	68.0	
Registered electors		56,297		
SDP win (new seat)				

1979 notional result
Party	Vote	%
Labour	22,128	58.8
Conservative	11,518	30.6
Liberal	3,077	8.2
Others	896	2.4
Turnout	37,619	
Electorate		

=== Elections in the 1910s ===
General election December 1910: Woolwich
Party	Candidate	Votes	%	±%
Labour	Will Crooks	8,252	50.7	+1.6
Conservative	William Adam	8,016	49.3	−1.6
Majority		236	1.4	N/A
Turnout		16,268		
Labour gain from Conservative		Swing	+1.6	

General election January 1910: Woolwich
Party	Candidate	Votes	%	±%
Conservative	William Adam	8,715	50.9	+7.5
Labour	Will Crooks	8,420	49.1	−7.5
Majority		295	1.8	N/A
Turnout		17,135		
Conservative gain from Labour		Swing	+7.5	

=== Elections in the 1900s ===
General election 1906: Woolwich
Party	Candidate	Votes	%	±%
Labour Repr. Cmte.	Will Crooks	9,026	56.6	N/A
Conservative	William Adam	6,914	43.4	N/A
Majority		2,112	13.2	N/A
Turnout		15,490	89.2	N/A
Registered electors		17,870		
Labour Repr. Cmte. gain from Conservative		Swing	N/A	

1903 Woolwich by-election
Party	Candidate	Votes	%	±%
Labour Repr. Cmte.	Will Crooks	8,687	61.4	New
Conservative	Geoffrey Drage	5,458	38.6	N/A
Majority		3,229	22.8	N/A
Turnout		14,145	87.7	N/A
Registered electors		16,136		
Labour Repr. Cmte. gain from Conservative		Swing	N/A	

1902 Woolwich by-election
Party	Candidate	Votes	%	±%
Conservative	Charles Beresford	Unopposed		
Registered electors		15,376		
Conservative hold				

General election 1900: Woolwich
Party	Candidate	Votes	%	±%
Conservative	Edwin Hughes	Unopposed		
Registered electors		14,592		
Conservative hold				

=== Elections in the 1890s ===
General election 1895: Woolwich
Party	Candidate	Votes	%	±%
Conservative	Edwin Hughes	6,662	63.3	+3.9
Lib-Lab	Ben Jones	3,857	36.7	−3.9
Majority		2,805	26.6	+7.8
Turnout		10,519	78.2	−3.5
Registered electors		13,458		
Conservative hold		Swing	+3.9	

General election 1892: Woolwich
Party	Candidate	Votes	%	±%
Conservative	Edwin Hughes	5,992	59.4	−2.9
Lib-Lab	Ben Jones	4,100	40.6	+2.9
Majority		1,892	18.8	−5.8
Turnout		10,092	81.7	+5.4
Registered electors		12,347		
Conservative hold		Swing	-2.9	

=== Elections in the 1880s ===
General election 1886: Woolwich
Party	Candidate	Votes	%	±%
Conservative	Edwin Hughes	4,647	62.3	+5.2
Liberal	George Evatt	2,811	37.7	−5.2
Majority		1,836	24.6	+10.4
Turnout		7,458	76.3	−8.9
Registered electors		9,769		
Conservative hold		Swing	+5.2	

General election 1885: Woolwich
Party	Candidate	Votes	%	±%
Conservative	Edwin Hughes	4,758	57.1	
Liberal	Henry Montagu Hozier	3,569	42.9	
Majority		1,189	14.2	
Turnout		8,327	85.2	
Registered electors		9,769		
Conservative win (new seat)				

== Sources ==
- Leigh Rayment's Historical List of MPs – Constituencies beginning with "W" (part 5)
