= South Dakota Department of Education =

U.S. state government agency

Agency overview
- Jurisdiction: South Dakota
- Headquarters: Pierre, South Dakota
- Annual budget: $801,000,000 (2019)
- Agency executive: Tiffany Sanderson, Secretary of Education
- Parent agency: State of South Dakota
- Website: http://doe.sd.gov/

The South Dakota Department of Education is the state education agency of South Dakota. It is headquartered in Pierre.

The department manages teacher certification, school district accreditation and academic subject standards for South Dakota’s accredited schools organized in 149 School Districts. The department organizes and executes its state education plan according to the federal law known as the Every Student Succeeds Act of 2015 and manages the state school accountability with the Report Card. It also manages state aid to schools subject to state law.

In 2015, South Dakota passed laws that created a new state aid formula for teachers compensation, special education and overhead support. To fund it, Governor Dennis Daugaard and the legislature raised sales taxes by a half a cent. Since then teacher compensation has slowly risen to a state average of slightly over $49,000 a year in salary.

Since December 7, 2019, the Secretary of Education has been Tiffany Sanderson, formerly a member of Governor Kristi Noem's senior staff.
