= Edwin Hughes (politician) =

British politician (1832–1904)

Hughes in 1895.

Sir Edwin Hughes (27 May 1832 – 15 September 1904) was an English solicitor and Conservative politician who sat in the House of Commons from 1885 to 1902.

== Biography ==
Hughes was born at Droitwich, Worcestershire, the son of William Hughes and his wife Elizabeth Gibbs. He was educated at Birmingham Grammar School and was admitted a solicitor in 1860. He moved to London where he became a solicitor to Local Board of Health. He was vice chairman of the Modern Building Society and chairman of Suburban Property Co. His political interests included being a member of the London School Board, and of the Metropolitan Board of Works. He was founder and vice president of the Metropolitan Local Government (Officers') Association. He was also lieutenant-colonel in the 1st Volunteer Brigade, London Division of the Royal Artillery. In 1881 he was resident in Plumstead.

Hughes was at one time Conservative Election Agent for London and the Borough of Greenwich. In 1885 Hughes was himself elected Member of Parliament for Woolwich. He held the seat until 1902.

Hughes was also the first representative on the London County Council for Woolwich in 1889 and served three terms. He was Mayor of Woolwich in 1901, and was also on the board of governors for Woolwich Polytechnic.

He was made a Knight Bachelor in the 1902 Birthday Honours and knighted by King Edward VII at Buckingham Palace on 18 December 1902.

Hughes died aged 72 and was buried in Plumstead Cemetery.

== Arms ==
Coat of arms of Edwin Hughes
Notes Granted 6 September 1887 by Clarenceux Blount Crest Two horse shoes Azure thereon a stag’s head erased Or. Escutcheon Azure within two chevronels Or between two mullets in chief and a horse rampant in base Argent three bezants and two fleurs-de-lis alternating of the second. Motto Faber Quisque Fortunae Suae

== See also ==
- List of members of London County Council 1889 - 1919

Parliament of the United Kingdom
New constituency	Member of Parliament for Woolwich; 1885 – 1902	Succeeded by Lord Charles Beresford
