= 1900 York by-election =

1900 UK parliamentary by-election

The 1900 York by-election was held on 6 February 1900. The by-election was held due to the resignation of Lord Charles Beresford in order to become second in command of the Mediterranean Fleet. It was won by the Conservative candidate Denison Faber.

1900 York by-election
Party	Candidate	Votes	%	±%
Conservative	Denison Faber	6,248	56.5	+22.1
Liberal	Alexander Murray	4,818	43.5	−22.1
Majority		1,430	13.0	+11.1
Turnout		11,066	88.0	−2.6
Registered electors		12,582		
Conservative hold		Swing	+22.1	
