= Benjamin F. Jones =

American academic administrator (born 1966)

South Dakota Secretary of Education
- In office May 7, 2019 – December 9, 2020
- Governor: Kristi Noem
- Succeeded by: Tiffany Sanderson

South Dakota State Historian
- Incumbent
- Assumed office December 9, 2020
- Governor: Kristi Noem
- Preceded by: Jay Vogt

Personal details
- Born: December 24, 1966 (age 59)
- Education: South Dakota State University; University of Nebraska–Lincoln; University of Kansas

Military service
- Branch/service: United States Air Force
- Rank: Lieutenant colonel

Benjamin F. Jones (born December 24, 1966) is an American historian and academic administrator who is State Historian of South Dakota and Director of the South Dakota State Historical Society. He was previously Secretary of Education of South Dakota from January 2019 to December 2020.

Jones was born in Sioux Falls, South Dakota and graduated from DeSmet High School in South Dakota. He earned a bachelor's degree in history from South Dakota State University, a master's degree from the University of Nebraska–Lincoln, and a PhD from the University of Kansas. He served 23 years in the United States Air Force, where he attained the rank of lieutenant colonel, and taught at the Air Force Academy.

Jones was dean of the College of Arts and Sciences at Dakota State University from 2013 to 2019. In January 2019 he was appointed interim Secretary of Education by Governor Kristi Noem, and in May 2019 he was named permanent secretary. On December 9, 2020, Jones left to become State Historian, replacing Jay Vogt. He was replaced as Secretary of Education by Tiffany Sanderson, formerly a member of Noem's senior staff.

As secretary, Jones led the development of the department's 2019 strategic plan, which prioritizes reducing the achievement gap for students in poverty and improving academic performance among Native Americans. He has also supported legislation to expand civic education in the state.

In 2016, Jones published Eisenhower’s Guerrillas: The Jedburghs, the Maquis, and the Liberation of France, which examines Operation Jedburgh and is based on his 1998 Master's thesis.

Jones lives in Sioux Falls, South Dakota.

== Works ==
- Jones, Benjamin (2016). Eisenhower's Guerrillas: the Jedburghs, the Maquis, and the Liberation of France. New York: Oxford University Press. ISBN 978-0-19-994208-4. OCLC 907657514.
