= Ben Jones (co-operator) =

British co-operator

- Born: Benjamin Jones; 9 September 1847; Salford, Lancashire, England
- Died: 2 March 1942 (aged 94); Bournemouth, Dorset, England
- Education: Owens College; Manchester Mechanics' Institute
- Political party: Liberal-Labour
- Movement: Co-operative
- Spouse: Annie White (m. 1870; died 1894)
- Children: 4

Benjamin Jones (9 September 1847 – 2 March 1942) was a British co-operative and political activist.

Born in Salford, Jones left school at the age of nine to work for a cabinet maker. While working as an errand boy, he studied at Owens College and the Manchester Mechanics' Institute, and managed to gain promotion to become a book-keeper. In 1866 was appointed as assistant book-keeper to the Manchester Co-operative Wholesale Society (CWS). In his spare time, he sat on the committee of the Mechanics Institute, and was a Sunday school teacher in Harpurhey. In 1870 he married Annie White, who was later active in the Co-operative Women's Guild, and died in 1894.

Jones was again promoted in 1871, becoming an assistant buyer for the CWS, and in 1874 he was made the founding general manager of the CWS's first London branch, based on Minories. At the same time, he was made honorary secretary of the Co-operative Union's southern board. Under his leadership, the shop proved successful, and in 1887 moved to larger premises on Leman Street. From a turnover of £130,000 in 1875, business grew to £3.25 million in 1902.

Jones remained interested in education, working with Arthur Dyke Acland to produce Working Men Co-operators, a textbook which remained in print until the 1940s. He was also the first chair of the London branch of the Co-operative Printing Society, founder of the Tenant Co-operators' Association, first secretary of the Co-operative Guild, and president of the Co-operative Congress in 1896, and for one day in 1889.

In 1894, Jones stood down from his southern Co-operative Union post. He remained very active in the movement, and in 1896 embarked on a world tour on behalf of the CWS, along with J. Clay and W. Stoker. A supporter of co-operative production, he was a leading figure in the establishment of a CWS flour mill in Silvertown, cocoa works in Luton and depots around the country.

Jones was also interested in the Parliamentary representation of the co-operative movement. He was the first secretary of the parliamentary committee of the Co-operative Union, and was also active in the Labour Representation League. He stood unsuccessfully as a Liberal-Labour candidate in Woolwich at the 1892 and 1895 general elections, with the backing of the Royal Arsenal Co-operative Society. At the 1900 general election, he instead stood in Deptford, but was again unsuccessful.

Jones retired to Bournemouth in 1902, purchasing the Queen Hotel, a bakery and some cafes. He wrote an autobiography, Life According to Jones, which was published in 1918, and various press articles on co-operative matters.

He died in Bournemouth on 2 March 1942 aged 94 and was survived by his four children.
