= List of MPs elected in the 1945 United Kingdom general election =

1945–1950 Parliament of the United Kingdom
←	1935–1945 Parliament	1950–1951 Parliament	→
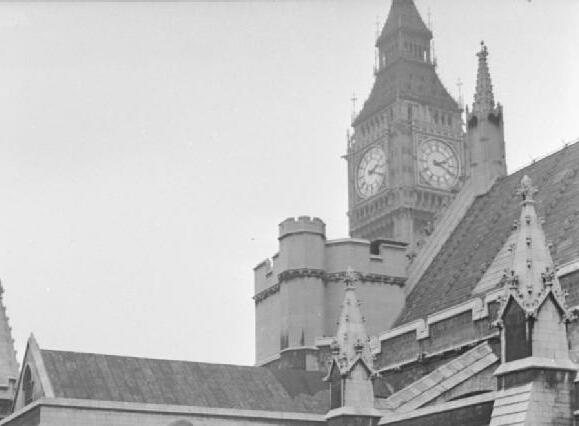
- Palace of Westminster in 1945

Overview
- Legislative body: Parliament of the United Kingdom
- Term: 26 July 1945 – 23 February 1950
- Election: 1945 United Kingdom general election
- Government: First Attlee ministry

House of Commons
- Members: 640
- Speaker: Douglas Clifton Brown
- Leader: Herbert Morrison; James Chuter Ede
- Prime Minister: Clement Attlee
- Leader of the Opposition: Winston Churchill
- Third-party leader: Clement Davies

House of Lords
- Lord Chancellor: Earl Jowitt

Crown-in-Parliament George VI

Sessions
- 1st: 1 August 1945 – 6 November 1946
- 2nd: 12 November 1946 – 20 October 1947
- 3rd: 21 October 1947 – 5 September 1948
- 4th: 14 September 1948 – 25 October 1948
- 5th: 26 October 1948 – 16 December 1949

This is a complete list of members of Parliament elected to the Parliament of the United Kingdom at the 1945 general election, held on 5 July 1945. See also, Constituency election results in the 1945 United Kingdom general election. 324 MPs were elected for the first time which was the record turnover of new members until 2024.

Notable newcomers to the House of Commons included Michael Stewart, George Brown, Hartley Shawcross, Barbara Castle, Bessie Braddock, Richard Crossman, Michael Foot, George Thomas, George Wigg, Woodrow Wyatt, Harold Wilson, James Callaghan, Hugh Gaitskell, Derick Heathcoat-Amory and Selwyn Lloyd.

Michael Foot was the last MP elected in 1945 to leave Parliament, vacating Beaenau Gwent in 1992 after retiring from politics following a 9-year backbench period after resigning Labour leadership.

== Composition ==
This diagram show the composition of the parties in the 1945 general election.

Note: This is not the official seating plan of the House of Commons, which has five rows of benches on each side, with the government party to the right of the speaker and opposition parties to the left, but with room for only around two-thirds of MPs to sit at any one time. The Commons Chamber was hit by bombs and the roof of Westminster Hall was set on fire. The fire service said that it would be impossible to save both, so it was decided to concentrate on saving the Hall. The Commons Chamber was entirely destroyed by the fire which spread to the Members' Lobby and caused the ceiling to collapse. By the following morning, all that was left of the Chamber was a smoking shell. As the Commons Chamber was totally destroyed and the Lords Chamber was damaged, both Houses moved to the Church House annexe and sat there from 13 May. From late June 1941 until October 1950, the Commons met in the Lords Chamber, while the Lords met in the Robing Room (a fact which was kept secret during the war).

Affiliation	Members
Labour Party	393
Conservative Party	197
Liberal Party	12
National Liberal	11
Independent	8
National Government	4
ILP	3
Communist	2
Independent Labour	2
Independent Conservative	2
Nationalist	2
Independent Liberal	2
Common Wealth	1
Independent Progressive	1
Total	640
Effective government majority	145

== A ==
Constituency	MP	Party
Aberavon	William Cove	Labour
Aberdare	George Hall	Labour
Aberdeen North	Hector Hughes	Labour
Aberdeen South	Sir Douglas Thomson, Bt	Scottish Unionist
Aberdeenshire Central	Henry Spence	Scottish Unionist
Aberdeenshire East	Robert Boothby	Scottish Unionist
Aberdeenshire West and Kincardine	Colin Thornton-Kemsley	Scottish Unionist
Abertillery	George Daggar	Labour
Abingdon	Sir Ralph Glyn, Bt	Conservative
Accrington	Walter Scott-Elliot	Labour
Acton	Joseph Sparks	Labour
Aldershot	Oliver Lyttelton	Conservative
Altrincham and Sale	Frederick Erroll	Conservative
Anglesey	Lady Megan Lloyd George	Liberal
Antrim (Two members)	Hon. Sir Hugh O'Neill	Ulster Unionist
Antrim (Two members)	Samuel Gillmor Haughton	Ulster Unionist
Argyllshire	Duncan McCallum	Conservative
Armagh	Sir William Allen	Ulster Unionist
Ashford	Edward Percy Smith	Conservative
Ashton-under-Lyne	Sir William Jowitt	Labour
Aylesbury	Sir Stanley Reed	Conservative
Ayr Burghs	Thomas Moore	Scottish Unionist
Ayrshire North and Bute	Sir Charles MacAndrew	Scottish Unionist
Ayrshire South	Alexander Sloan	Labour
== B ==
Balham and Tooting	Richard Adams	Labour
Banbury	Douglas Dodds-Parker	Conservative
Banff	Sir William Duthie	Conservative
Barking	Somerville Hastings	Labour
Barkston Ash	Leonard Ropner	Conservative
Barnard Castle	Sydney Lavers	Labour
Barnet	Stephen Taylor	Labour
Barnsley	Frank Collindridge	Labour
Barnstaple	Christopher Peto	Conservative
Barrow-in-Furness	Walter Monslow	Labour
Basingstoke	Patrick Donner	Conservative
Bassetlaw	Frederick Bellenger	Labour
Bath	James Pitman	Conservative
Batley and Morley	Hubert Beaumont	Labour
Battersea North	Francis Douglas	Labour
Battersea South	Caroline Ganley	Labour Co-op
Bedford	Thomas Skeffington-Lodge	Labour
Bedfordshire Mid	Alan Lennox-Boyd	Conservative
Bedwellty	Sir Charles Edwards	Labour
Belfast, East	Thomas Loftus Cole	Ulster Unionist
Belfast, North	William Neill	Ulster Unionist
Belfast, South	Conolly Gage	Ulster Unionist
Belfast, West	Jack Beattie	Northern Ireland Labour
Belper	George Brown	Labour
Bermondsey West	Richard Sargood	Labour
Berwick and Haddington	John Robertson	Labour
Berwick-on-Tweed	Robert Thorp	Conservative
Bethnal Green North-East	Daniel Chater	Labour Co-op
Bethnal Green South-West	Percy Holman	Labour Co-op
Bewdley	Roger Conant	Conservative
Bexley	Jennie Adamson	Labour
Birkenhead East	Frank Soskice	Labour
Birkenhead West	Percy Collick	Labour
Birmingham Acock's Green	Henry Usborne	Labour
Birmingham Aston	Woodrow Wyatt	Labour
Birmingham Deritend	Fred Longden	Labour Co-op
Birmingham Duddeston	Edith Wills	Labour Co-op
Birmingham Edgbaston	Sir Peter Bennett	Conservative
Birmingham Erdington	Julius Silverman	Labour
Birmingham Handsworth	Harold Roberts	Conservative
Birmingham King's Norton	Raymond Blackburn	Labour
Birmingham Ladywood	Victor Yates	Labour
Birmingham Moseley	Sir Patrick Hannon	Conservative
Birmingham Sparkbrook	Percy Shurmer	Labour
Birmingham West	Charles Simmons	Labour
Birmingham Yardley	Wesley Perrins	Labour
Bishop Auckland	Hugh Dalton	Labour
Blackburn (Two members)	John Edwards	Labour
Blackburn (Two members)	Barbara Castle	Labour
Blackpool North	Toby Low	Conservative
Blackpool South	Roland Robinson	Conservative
Blaydon	William Whiteley	Labour
Bodmin	Douglas Marshall	Conservative
Bolton (Two members)	Jack Jones	Labour
Bolton (Two members)	John Lewis	Labour
Bootle	John Kinley	Labour
Bosworth	Arthur Allen	Labour
Bothwell	John Timmons	Labour
Bournemouth	Sir Leonard Lyle, Bt.	Conservative
Bow and Bromley	Charles Key	Labour
Bradford Central	Maurice Webb	Labour
Bradford East	Frank McLeavy	Labour
Bradford North	Muriel Nichol	Labour
Bradford South	Meredith Titterington	Labour Co-op
Brecon and Radnor	Tudor Watkins	Labour
Brentford and Chiswick	Francis Noel-Baker	Labour
Bridgwater	Vernon Bartlett	Indep. Progressive
Brigg	Tom Williamson	Labour
Brighton (Two members)	William Teeling	Conservative
Brighton (Two members)	Anthony Marlowe	Conservative
Bristol Central	Stan Awbery	Labour
Bristol East	Hon. Sir Stafford Cripps	Labour
Bristol North	Will Coldrick	Labour Co-op
Bristol South	Will Wilkins	Labour
Bristol West	Hon. Oliver Stanley	Conservative
Brixton	Marcus Lipton	Labour
Bromley	Sir Edward Campbell, Bt	Conservative
Broxtowe	Seymour Cocks	Labour
Buckingham	Aidan Crawley	Labour
Bucklow	William Shepherd	Conservative
Buckrose	George Wadsworth	Liberal
Burnley	Wilfrid Burke	Labour
Burslem	Albert Davies	Labour
Burton	Arthur William Lyne	Labour
Bury	Walter Fletcher	Conservative
Bury St. Edmunds	Geoffrey Clifton-Brown	Conservative
== C ==
Caerphilly	Ness Edwards	Labour
Caithness and Sutherland	Eric Gandar Dower	Conservative
Camberwell North	Cecil Manning	Labour
Camberwell North West	Freda Corbet	Labour
Camborne	Peter Agnew	Conservative
Cambridge	Arthur Symonds	Labour
Cambridge University (Two members)	Kenneth Pickthorn	Conservative
Cambridge University (Two members)	Wilson Harris	Independent
Cambridgeshire	Albert Stubbs	Labour
Cannock	Jennie Lee	Labour
Canterbury	John Baker White	Conservative
Cardiff Central	George Thomas	Labour
Cardiff East	Hilary Marquand	Labour
Cardiff South	James Callaghan	Labour
Cardiganshire	Roderic Bowen	Liberal
Carlisle	Edgar Grierson	Labour
Carmarthen	Rhys Hopkin Morris	Liberal
Carnarvon Boroughs	David Price-White	Conservative
Carnarvonshire	Goronwy Roberts	Labour
Carshalton	Antony Head	Conservative
Chatham	Arthur Bottomley	Labour
Chelmsford	Ernest Millington	Common Wealth
Chelsea	Allan Noble	Conservative
Cheltenham	Daniel Lipson	Independent Conservative
Chertsey	Arthur Marsden	Conservative
Chesterfield	George Benson	Labour
Chester-le-Street	Jack Lawson	Labour
Chichester	Hon. Lancelot Joynson-Hicks	Conservative
Chippenham	David Eccles	Conservative
Chislehurst	George Wallace	Labour
Chorley	Clifford Kenyon	Labour
Cirencester and Tewkesbury	William Morrison	Conservative
City of Chester	Basil Nield	Conservative
City of London (Two members)	Sir Andrew Duncan	National
City of London (Two members)	Sir George Broadbridge, Bt	Conservative
Clapham	John Battley	Labour
Clay Cross	Harold Neal	Labour
Cleveland	Octavius Willey	Labour
Clitheroe	Harry Randall	Labour
Coatbridge	Jean Mann	Labour
Colchester	George Smith	Labour
Colne Valley	Glenvil Hall	Labour
Combined English Universities (Two members)	Eleanor Rathbone	Independent
Combined English Universities (Two members)	Kenneth Lindsay	Independent
Combined Scottish Universities (Three members)	Sir John Anderson	National
Combined Scottish Universities (Three members)	Sir John Boyd Orr	Independent
Combined Scottish Universities (Three members)	Sir John Graham Kerr	Conservative
Cornwall North	Tom Horabin	Liberal
Consett	James Glanville	Labour
Coventry East	Richard Crossman	Labour
Coventry West	Maurice Edelman	Labour
Crewe	Scholefield Allen	Labour
Croydon North	Henry Willink	Conservative
Croydon South	David Rees-Williams	Labour
Cumberland North	Wilfrid Roberts	Liberal
== D ==
Dagenham	John Parker	Labour
Darlington	David Hardman	Labour
Dartford	Norman Dodds	Labour Co-op
Darwen	Stanley Prescott	Conservative
Daventry	Reginald Manningham-Buller	Conservative
Denbigh	Sir Henry Morris-Jones	Liberal National
Deptford	John Wilmot	Labour
Derby (Two members)	Clifford Wilcock	Labour
Derby (Two members)	Philip Noel-Baker	Labour
Derbyshire North East	Henry White	Labour
Derbyshire South	Arthur Champion	Labour
Derbyshire West	Charles Frederick White	Labour
Devizes	Christopher Hollis	Conservative
Dewsbury	William Paling	Labour
Doncaster	Evelyn Walkden	Labour
Don Valley	Tom Williams	Labour
Dorset East	Mervyn Wheatley	Conservative
Dorset North	Frank Byers	Liberal
Dorset South	Victor Montagu	Conservative
Dorset West	Simon Wingfield Digby	Conservative
Dover	John Thomas	Labour
Down (Two members)	James Little	Independent Ulster Unionist
Down (Two members)	W. D. Smiles	Ulster Unionist
Dudley	George Wigg	Labour
Dulwich	Wilfrid Vernon	Labour
Dumbarton Burghs	David Kirkwood	Labour
Dumfriesshire	Niall Macpherson	Liberal National
Dunbartonshire	Adam McKinlay	Labour
Dundee (Two members)	Thomas Cook	Labour
Dundee (Two members)	John Strachey	Labour
Dunfermline Burghs	William McLean Watson	Labour
Durham	Charles Grey	Labour
== E ==
Ealing East	Sir Frank Sanderson, Bt	Conservative
Ealing West	James Hudson	Labour Co-op
Eastbourne	Charles Taylor	Conservative
East Grinstead	Ralph Clarke	Conservative
East Ham North	Percy Daines	Labour Co-op
East Ham South	Alfred Barnes	Labour Co-op
Ebbw Vale	Aneurin Bevan	Labour
Eccles	William Proctor	Labour
Eddisbury	Sir John Barlow, Bt	Liberal National
Edinburgh Central	Andrew Gilzean	Labour
Edinburgh East	Frederick Pethick-Lawrence	Labour
Edinburgh North	George Willis	Labour
Edinburgh South	Sir William Darling	Conservative
Edinburgh West	Ian Clark Hutchison	Conservative
Edmonton	Evan Durbin	Labour
Elland	Frederick Cobb	Labour
Enfield	Ernest Davies	Labour
Epping	Leah Manning	Labour
Epsom	Sir Archibald Southby, Bt	Conservative
Essex South East	Ray Gunter	Labour
Eton and Slough	Benn Levy	Labour
Evesham	Rupert de la Bère	Conservative
Exeter	John Maude	Conservative
Eye	Edgar Granville	Liberal
== F ==
Fareham	Sir Dymoke White, Bt	Conservative
Farnham	Godfrey Nicholson	Conservative
Farnworth	George Tomlinson	Labour
Faversham	Percy Wells	Labour
Fermanagh and Tyrone (Two members)	Patrick Cunningham	Irish Nationalist
Fermanagh and Tyrone (Two members)	Anthony Mulvey	Irish Nationalist
Fife East	James Henderson-Stewart	Liberal National
Fife West	Willie Gallacher	Communist
Finchley	John Crowder	Conservative
Finsbury	John Platts-Mills	Labour
Flintshire	Nigel Birch	Conservative
Forest of Dean	M. Philips Price	Labour
Forfarshire	Hon. Simon Ramsay	Conservative
Frome	Walter Farthing	Labour
Fulham East	Michael Stewart	Labour
Fulham West	Edith Summerskill	Labour
Fylde	Claude Lancaster	Conservative
== G ==
Gainsborough	Harry Crookshank	Conservative
Galloway	John Mackie	Independent Conservative
Gateshead	Konni Zilliacus	Labour
Gillingham	Joseph Binns	Labour
Glasgow Bridgeton	James Maxton	Independent Labour Party
Glasgow Camlachie	Campbell Stephen	Independent Labour Party
Glasgow Cathcart	Francis Beattie	Conservative
Glasgow Central	James Hutchison	Conservative
Glasgow Gorbals	George Buchanan	Labour
Glasgow Govan	Neil Maclean	Labour
Glasgow Hillhead	James Reid	Conservative
Glasgow Kelvingrove	John Williams	Labour
Glasgow Maryhill	William Hannan	Labour
Glasgow Partick	Arthur Young	Conservative
Glasgow Pollok	Thomas Galbraith	Conservative
Glasgow St. Rollox	William Leonard	Labour Co-op
Glasgow Shettleston	John McGovern	Independent Labour Party
Glasgow Springburn	John Forman	Labour Co-op
Glasgow Tradeston	John Rankin	Labour Co-op
Gloucester	Moss Turner-Samuels	Labour
Gower	David Grenfell	Labour
Grantham	Denis Kendall	Independent
Gravesend	Garry Allighan	Labour
Great Yarmouth	Ernest Kinghorn	Labour
Greenock	Hector McNeil	Labour
Greenwich	Joseph Reeves	Labour
Grimsby	Kenneth Younger	Labour
Guildford	Sir John Jarvis, Bt	Conservative
== H ==
Hackney Central	Harry Hynd	Labour
Hackney North	Henry Edwin Goodrich	Labour
Hackney South	Herbert Butler	Labour
Halifax	Dryden Brook	Labour
Hamilton	Tom Fraser	Labour
Hammersmith North	Denis Pritt	Independent Labour
Hammersmith South	William Thomas Adams	Labour Co-op
Hampstead	Charles Challen	Conservative
Hanley	Barnett Stross	Labour
Harborough	Humphrey Attewell	Labour
Harrow East	Frederick Skinnard	Labour
Harrow West	Norman Bower	Conservative
The Hartlepools	D. T. Jones	Labour
Harwich	Sir Stanley Holmes	Liberal National
Hastings	Neill Cooper-Key	Conservative
Hemel Hempstead	Frances Davidson	Conservative
Hemsworth	George Griffiths	Labour
Hendon North	Barbara Ayrton-Gould	Labour
Hendon South	Sir Hugh Lucas-Tooth, Bt	Conservative
Henley	Sir Gifford Fox, Bt	Conservative
Hereford	James Thomas	Conservative
Hertford	Derek Walker-Smith	Conservative
Heston and Isleworth	William Williams	Labour
Hexham	Douglas Clifton Brown	Conservative
Heywood and Radcliffe	John Whittaker	Labour
High Peak	Hugh Molson	Conservative
Hitchin	Philip Asterley Jones	Labour
Holborn	Hon. Max Aitken	Conservative
Holderness	Gurney Braithwaite	Conservative
Holland-with-Boston	Herbert Butcher	Liberal National
Honiton	Cedric Drewe	Conservative
Horncastle	John Maitland	Conservative
Hornchurch	Geoffrey Bing	Labour
Hornsey	David Gammans	Conservative
Horsham	The Earl Winterton	Conservative
Houghton-le-Spring	Billy Blyton	Labour
Howdenshire	Clifford Glossop	Conservative
Huddersfield	Joseph Mallalieu	Labour
Huntingdonshire	David Renton	Liberal National
Hythe	Harry Mackeson	Conservative
== I ==
Ilford, North	Mabel Ridealgh	Labour Co-op
Ilford, South	Jim Ranger	Labour
Ilkeston	George Oliver	Labour
Ince	Tom Brown	Labour
Inverness	Sir Murdo Macdonald	Indep. National Liberal
Ipswich	Richard Stokes	Labour
Isle of Ely	Harry Legge-Bourke	Conservative
Isle of Thanet	Hon. Edward Carson	Conservative
Isle of Wight	Peter Macdonald	Conservative
Islington East	Eric Fletcher	Labour
Islington North	Leslie Haden Guest	Labour
Islington South	William Cluse	Labour
Islington West	Frederick Montague	Labour
== J ==
Jarrow	Ellen Wilkinson	Labour
== K ==
Keighley	Ivor Thomas	Labour
Kennington	Charles Gibson	Labour
Kensington North	George Rogers	Labour
Kensington South	Sir William Davison	Conservative
Kettering	Gilbert Mitchison	Labour
Kidderminster	Louis Tolley	Labour
Kilmarnock	Clarice Shaw	Labour
King's Lynn	Frederick Wise	Labour
Kingston upon Hull Central	Mark Hewitson ×	Labour
Kingston upon Hull East	Harry Pursey	Labour
Kingston upon Hull North West	Kim Mackay	Labour
Kingston upon Hull South West	Sydney Smith	Labour
Kingston-upon-Thames	John Boyd-Carpenter	Conservative
Kingswinford	Arthur Henderson	Labour
Kinross & West Perthshire	William McNair Snadden	Conservative
Kirkcaldy Burghs	Thomas Hubbard	Labour
Knutsford	Walter Bromley-Davenport	Conservative
== L ==
Lambeth North	George Strauss	Labour
Lanark	Tom Steele	Labour
Lanarkshire North	Margaret Herbison	Labour
Lancaster	Fitzroy Maclean	Conservative
Leeds Central	George Porter	Labour
Leeds North	Osbert Peake	Conservative
Leeds North East	Alice Bacon	Labour
Leeds South	Hugh Gaitskell	Labour
Leeds South East	James Milner	Labour
Leeds West	Tom Stamford	Labour
Leek	Harold Davies	Labour
Leicester East	Terence Donovan	Labour
Leicester South	Bert Bowden	Labour
Leicester West	Barnett Janner	Labour
Leigh	Harold Boardman	Labour
Leith	James Hoy	Labour
Leominster	Archer Baldwin	Conservative
Lewes	Tufton Beamish	Conservative
Lewisham East	Herbert Morrison	Labour
Lewisham West	Arthur Skeffington	Labour
Leyton East	Albert Bechervaise	Labour
Leyton West	Reginald Sorensen	Labour
Lichfield	Cecil Poole	Labour
Lincoln	George Deer	Labour
Linlithgowshire	George Mathers	Labour
Liverpool East Toxteth	Patrick Buchan-Hepburn	Conservative
Liverpool Edge Hill	Richard Clitherow	Labour
Liverpool Everton	Bertie Kirby	Labour
Liverpool Exchange	Bessie Braddock	Labour
Liverpool Fairfield	Arthur Moody	Labour
Liverpool Kirkdale	William Keenan	Labour
Liverpool Scotland	David Logan	Labour
Liverpool Walton	James Haworth	Labour
Liverpool Wavertree	Victor Raikes	Conservative
Liverpool West Derby	Sir David Maxwell Fyfe	Conservative
Liverpool West Toxteth	Joseph Gibbins	Labour
Llandaff and Barry	Lynn Ungoed-Thomas	Labour
Llanelly	Jim Griffiths	Labour
London University	Sir Ernest Graham-Little	Independent
Londonderry	Sir Ronald Ross, Bt	Ulster Unionist
Lonsdale	Sir Ian Fraser	Conservative
Loughborough	Mont Follick	Labour
Louth	Cyril Osborne	Conservative
Lowestoft	Edward Evans	Labour
Ludlow	Uvedale Corbett	Conservative
Luton	William Warbey	Labour
== M ==
Macclesfield	Arthur Vere Harvey	Conservative
Maidstone	Alfred Bossom	Conservative
Maldon	Tom Driberg	Labour
Manchester Ardwick	Joseph Henderson	Labour
Manchester Blackley	Jack Diamond	Labour
Manchester Clayton	Harry Thorneycroft	Labour
Manchester Exchange	Harold Lever	Labour
Manchester Gorton	William Oldfield	Labour
Manchester Hulme	Frederick Lee	Labour
Manchester Moss Side	William Griffiths	Labour
Manchester Platting	Hugh Delargy	Labour
Manchester Rusholme	Lester Hutchinson	Labour
Manchester Withington	Edward Fleming	Conservative
Mansfield	Bernard Taylor	Labour
Melton	Anthony Nutting	Conservative
Merioneth	Emrys Roberts	Liberal
Merthyr	S. O. Davies	Labour
Middlesbrough East	Alfred Edwards	Labour
Middlesbrough West	Geoffrey Cooper	Labour
Middleton and Prestwich	Ernest Gates	Conservative
Midlothian North	Lord John Hope	Conservative
Midlothian South and Peebles	David Pryde	Labour
Mitcham	Tom Braddock	Labour
Monmouth	Leslie Pym	Conservative
Montgomery	Clement Davies	Liberal
Montrose Burghs	Hon. John Maclay	Liberal National
Moray & Nairn	Hon. James Stuart	Conservative
Morpeth	Robert Taylor	Labour
Mossley	George Woods	Labour Co-op
Motherwell	Alexander Anderson	Labour
== N ==
Neath	D. J. Williams	Labour
Nelson and Colne	Sydney Silverman	Labour
Newark	Sidney Shephard	Conservative
Newbury	Anthony Hurd	Conservative
Newcastle-under-Lyme	John Mack	Labour
Newcastle-upon-Tyne Central	Lyall Wilkes	Labour
Newcastle-upon-Tyne East	Arthur Blenkinsop	Labour
Newcastle-upon-Tyne North	Sir Cuthbert Headlam, Bt	Conservative
Newcastle-upon-Tyne West	Ernest Popplewell	Labour
New Forest and Christchurch	Oliver Crosthwaite-Eyre	Conservative
Newport	Peter Freeman	Labour
Newton	Sir Robert Young	Labour
Norfolk East	Frank Medlicott	Liberal National
Norfolk North	Edwin Gooch	Labour
Norfolk South	Christopher Mayhew	Labour
Norfolk South-West	Sidney Dye	Labour
Normanton	Tom Smith	Labour
Northampton	Reginald Paget	Labour
Northwich	John Foster	Conservative
Norwich (Two members)	Lady Noel-Buxton	Labour
Norwich (Two members)	John Paton	Labour
Norwood	Ron Chamberlain	Labour
Nottingham Central	Geoffrey de Freitas	Labour
Nottingham East	James Harrison	Labour
Nottingham South	Norman Smith	Labour Co-op
Nottingham West	Tom O'Brien	Labour
Nuneaton	Frank Bowles	Labour
== O ==
Ogmore	Edward Williams	Labour
Oldham (Two members)	Frank Fairhurst	Labour
Oldham (Two members)	Leslie Hale	Labour
Orkney and Shetland	Basil Neven-Spence	Conservative
Ormskirk	Harold Wilson	Labour
Orpington	Sir Waldron Smithers	Conservative
Oswestry	Oliver Poole	Conservative
Oxford	Hon. Quintin Hogg	Conservative
Oxford University (Two members)	Sir Arthur Salter	Independent
Oxford University (Two members)	Alan Herbert	Independent
== P ==
Paddington North	Sir Noel Mason-Macfarlane	Labour
Paddington South	Ernest Augustus Taylor	Conservative
Paisley	Viscount Corvedale	Labour
Peckham	Lewis Silkin	Labour
Pembrokeshire	Hon. Gwilym Lloyd George	Liberal
Penistone	Henry McGhee	Labour
Penrith and Cockermouth	Alan Gandar-Dower	Conservative
Penryn and Falmouth	Evelyn King	Labour
Perth	Alan Gomme-Duncan	Conservative
Peterborough	Stanley Tiffany	Labour Co-op
Petersfield	George Jeffreys	Conservative
Plymouth Devonport	Michael Foot	Labour
Plymouth Drake	Hubert Medland	Labour
Plymouth Sutton	Lucy Middleton	Labour
Pontefract	Percy Barstow	Labour
Pontypool	Arthur Jenkins	Labour
Pontypridd	Arthur Pearson	Labour
Poplar South	William Henry Guy	Labour
Portsmouth Central	Julian Snow	Labour
Portsmouth North	Donald Bruce	Labour
Portsmouth South	Sir Jocelyn Lucas, Bt	Conservative
Preston (Two members)	Samuel Segal	Labour
Preston (Two members)	John William Sunderland	Labour
Pudsey and Otley	Malcolm Stoddart-Scott	Conservative
Putney	Hugh Linstead	Conservative
== Q ==
Queen's University of Belfast	Douglas Savory	Ulster Unionist
== R ==
Reading	Ian Mikardo	Labour
Reigate	Gordon Touche	Conservative
Renfrewshire, East	Guy Lloyd	Conservative
Renfrewshire, West	Thomas Scollan	Labour
Rhondda East	William Mainwaring	Labour
Rhondda West	William John	Labour
Richmond, Surrey	George Harvie-Watt	Conservative
Richmond, Yorkshire	Sir Thomas Dugdale, Bt	Conservative
Ripon	Christopher York	Conservative
Rochdale	Hyacinth Morgan	Labour
Romford	Thomas Macpherson	Labour
Ross and Cromarty	John MacLeod	Indep. National Liberal
Rossendale	George Henry Walker	Labour
Rother Valley	David Griffiths	Labour
Rotherham	William Dobbie	Labour
Rotherhithe	Sir Ben Smith	Labour
Rothwell	Thomas Brooks	Labour
Roxburgh and Selkirk	Lord William Montagu Douglas Scott	Conservative
Royton	Harold Sutcliffe	Conservative
Rugby	William Brown	Independent
Rushcliffe	Florence Paton	Labour
Rutherglen	Gilbert McAllister	Labour
Rutland and Stamford	Lord Willoughby de Eresby	Conservative
Rye	William Cuthbert	Conservative
== S ==
Saffron Walden	Rab Butler	Conservative
St Albans	Cyril Dumpleton	Labour
St Helens	Hartley Shawcross	Labour
St Ives	Alec Beechman	Liberal National
St Marylebone	Sir Wavell Wakefield	Conservative
St Pancras North	George House	Labour
St Pancras South East	Santo Jeger	Labour
St Pancras South West	Haydn Davies	Labour
Salford North	William McAdam	Labour
Salford South	Edward Hardy	Labour
Salford West	Charles Royle	Labour
Salisbury	John Morrison	Conservative
Scarborough and Whitby	Alexander Spearman	Conservative
Seaham	Manny Shinwell	Labour
Sedgefield	John Leslie	Labour
Sevenoaks	Charles Ponsonby	Conservative
Sheffield, Attercliffe	John Hynd	Labour
Sheffield, Brightside	Fred Marshall	Labour
Sheffield, Central	Harry Morris	Labour
Sheffield, Ecclesall	Peter Roberts	Conservative
Sheffield, Hallam	Roland Jennings	Conservative
Sheffield, Hillsborough	A. V. Alexander	Labour Co-op
Sheffield, Park	Thomas Burden	Labour
Shipley	Arthur Creech Jones	Labour
Shoreditch	Ernest Thurtle	Labour
Shrewsbury	John Langford-Holt	Conservative
Skipton	Burnaby Drayson	Conservative
Smethwick	Alfred Dobbs	Labour
Solihull	Martin Lindsay	Conservative
Southall	Walter Ayles	Labour
Southampton (Two members)	Ralph Morley	Labour
Southampton (Two members)	Tommy Lewis	Labour
Southend-on-Sea	Henry Channon	Conservative
South Molton	Hon. George Lambert	Liberal National
Southport	Robert Hudson	Conservative
South Shields	James Chuter Ede	Labour
Southwark Central	John Hanbury Martin	Labour
Southwark North	George Isaacs	Labour
Southwark South East	Thomas Naylor	Labour
Sowerby	John Belcher	Labour
Spelthorne	George Pargiter	Labour
Spennymoor	James Murray	Labour
Spen Valley	Granville Maynard Sharp	Labour
Stafford	Stephen Swingler	Labour
Stalybridge and Hyde	Gordon Lang	Labour
Stepney Limehouse	Clement Attlee	Labour
Stepney Mile End	Phil Piratin	Communist
Stirling and Falkirk	Joseph Westwood	Labour
Stirlingshire East and Clackmannan	Arthur Woodburn	Labour
Stirlingshire West	Alfred Balfour	Labour
Stockport (Two members)	Sir Arnold Gridley	Conservative
Stockport (Two members)	Norman Hulbert	Conservative
Stockton on Tees	George Chetwynd	Labour
Stoke Newington	David Weitzman	Labour
Stoke-on-Trent	Ellis Smith	Labour
Stone	Hugh Fraser	Conservative
Stourbridge	Arthur Moyle	Labour
Streatham	David Robertson	Conservative
Stretford	Herschel Austin	Labour
Stroud	Ben Parkin	Labour
Sudbury	Roland Hamilton	Labour
Sunderland (Two members)	Fred Willey	Labour
Sunderland (Two members)	Richard Ewart	Labour
Surrey East	Hon. Michael Astor	Conservative
Sutton and Cheam	Sydney Marshall	Conservative
Sutton Coldfield	Sir John Mellor, Bt	Conservative
Swansea East	David Mort	Labour
Swansea West	Percy Morris	Labour
Swindon	Thomas Reid	Labour
== T ==
Taunton	Victor Collins	Labour
Tavistock	Henry Studholme	Conservative
Thirsk and Malton	Robin Turton	Conservative
Thornbury	Joseph Alpass	Labour
Thurrock	Leslie Solley	Labour
Tiverton	Derick Heathcoat-Amory	Conservative
Tonbridge	Gerald Wellington Williams	Conservative
Torquay	Charles Williams	Conservative
Totnes	Ralph Rayner	Conservative
Tottenham North	Robert Morrison	Labour Co-op
Tottenham South	Frederick Messer	Labour
Twickenham	Edward Keeling	Conservative
Tynemouth	Grace Colman	Labour
== U ==
University of Wales	William John Gruffydd	Liberal
Uxbridge	Frank Beswick	Labour Co-op
== W ==
Wakefield	Arthur Greenwood	Labour
Wallasey	Ernest Marples	Conservative
Wallsend	John McKay	Labour
Walsall	William Wells	Labour
Walthamstow East	Harry Wallace	Labour
Walthamstow West	Valentine McEntee	Labour
Wandsworth Central	Ernest Bevin	Labour
Wansbeck	Alfred Robens	Labour
Warrington	Edward Porter	Labour
Warwick and Leamington	Anthony Eden	Conservative
Waterloo	Malcolm Bullock	Conservative
Watford	John Freeman	Labour
Wednesbury	Stanley Evans	Labour
Wellingborough	George Lindgren	Labour
Wells	Dennis Coleridge Boles	Conservative
Wembley North	Charles Hobson	Labour
Wembley South	Clarence Barton	Labour
Wentworth	Wilfred Paling	Labour
West Bromwich	John Dugdale	Labour
West Ham Plaistow	Elwyn Jones	Labour
West Ham Silvertown	Louis Comyns	Labour
West Ham Stratford	Henry Nicholls	Labour
West Ham Upton	Arthur Lewis	Labour
Westbury	Robert Grimston	Conservative
Western Isles	Malcolm Macmillan	Labour
Westhoughton	Rhys Davies	Labour
Westminster Abbey	Sir Harold Webbe	Conservative
Westminster St George's	Arthur Howard	Conservative
Westmorland	William Fletcher-Vane	Conservative
Weston-super-Mare	Ian Orr-Ewing	Conservative
Whitechapel	Walter Edwards	Labour
Whitehaven	Frank Anderson	Labour
Widnes	Christopher Shawcross	Labour
Wigan	William Foster	Labour
Willesden East	Maurice Orbach	Labour
Willesden West	Samuel Viant	Labour
Wimbledon	Arthur Palmer	Labour
Winchester	George Jeger	Labour
Windsor	Charles Mott-Radclyffe	Conservative
Wirral	Selwyn Lloyd	Conservative
Wolverhampton Bilston	Will Nally	Labour Co-op
Wolverhampton East	John Baird	Labour
Wolverhampton West	Billy Hughes	Labour
Woodbridge	Hon. John Hare	Conservative
Woodford	Winston Churchill	Conservative
Wood Green	Sir Beverley Baxter	Conservative
Woolwich East	George Hicks	Labour
Woolwich West	Henry Berry	Labour
Worcester	Hon. George Ward	Conservative
Workington	Fred Peart	Labour
Worthing	Otho Prior-Palmer	Conservative
The Wrekin	Ivor Owen Thomas	Labour
Wrexham	Robert Richards	Labour
Wycombe	John Haire	Labour
== Y ==
Yeovil	William Kingsmill	Conservative
York	John Corlett	Labour

° Sir Edward Campbell died on 17 July and Leslie Pym died on 18 July before the poll was announced. By-elections were held in the autumn
× The sitting MP for Hull, Central, Walter Windsor, died during the election campaign. Mark Hewitson was elected in a postponed poll in August.

== By-elections ==
See the list of United Kingdom by-elections.

== Changes ==
- 1946 – Ernest Millington (Chelmsford) joins Labour Party from Common Wealth Party
- 1947 – Campbell Stephen (Glasgow, Camlachie) joins Labour Party from Independent Labour Party shortly before death
- 1947 – John McGovern (Glasgow, Shettleston) joins Labour Party from Independent Labour Party
- 1947 – Tom Horabin (North Cornwall) joins Labour Party from Liberal Party
- 1948 – James Carmichael (Glasgow, Bridgeton) joins Labour Party from Independent Labour Party (last ILP MP)
- March 1948 – John Mackie (Galloway) rejoins Conservative Party having been deselected in 1945 (stood as an Independent Unionist in 1945 election)
- 1948 – Ivor Thomas (Keighley) defects from the Labour Party to the Conservative Party over iron and steel nationalisation
- 1948 – Alfred Edwards (Middlesbrough East) defects from the Labour Party to the Conservative Party over iron and steel nationalisation
- 1948 – John Platts-Mills (Finsbury) expelled from Labour Party over opposition to foreign policy and support for Italian Socialist Party; sits as Labour Independent
- May 1949 – Konni Zilliacus (Gateshead) expelled from Labour Party over opposition to NATO and foreign policy; sits as Labour Independent
- May 1949 – Leslie Solley (Thurrock) expelled from Labour Party over opposition to NATO and foreign policy; sits as Labour Independent
- May 1949 – Lester Hutchinson (Manchester, Rusholme) expelled from Labour Party over opposition to NATO and foreign policy; sits as Labour Independent
- 1949 – Konni Zilliacus (Gateshead) breaks with Labour Independent Group over their support for Stalin against Tito

== See also ==
- 1945 United Kingdom general election
- List of parliaments of the United Kingdom
- List of United Kingdom by-elections (1931–1950)
- List of MPs for constituencies in Scotland (1945–1950)
- List of MPs for constituencies in Wales (1945–1950)
