= Bournemouth by-election =

Bournemouth by-election may refer to:

- 1940 Bournemouth by-election
- 1945 Bournemouth by-election
- 1952 Bournemouth East and Christchurch by-election
- 1954 Bournemouth West by-election
- 1977 Bournemouth East by-election
