= Wigoder =

Wigoder is a surname. Notable people with the surname include:

- Basil Wigoder (1921—2004), British politician and barrister.
- Charles Wigoder (born 1960), English telecommunications entrepreneur and philanthropist.
- Geoffrey Wigoder (1922—1999), British-born Israeli historian, broadcaster, academic and encyclopedist.
- Thelma Wigoder (born 1925), actress, who took the stage name Thelma Ruby.
