= Baron Lyle of Westbourne =

Extinct barony in the Peerage of the United Kingdom

Baron Lyle of Westbourne, of Canford Cliffs in the County of Dorset, was a title in the Peerage of the United Kingdom. It was created on 13 September 1945 for Sir Leonard Lyle, 1st Baronet, the former Member of Parliament for Stratford, Epping, and Bournemouth. He had already been created a Baronet, of Canford Cliffs in the County of Dorset, in the Baronetage of the United Kingdom on 22 June 1932. The title became extinct on the death of the second Baron in 1976.

The first Baron was the nephew of Sir Robert Lyle, 1st Baronet, and of Sir Alexander Lyle, 1st Baronet (see Lyle Baronets).

== Barons Lyle of Westbourne (1945) ==
- (Charles Ernest) Leonard Lyle, 1st Baron Lyle of Westbourne (1882–1954)
- Charles John Leonard Lyle, 2nd Baron Lyle of Westbourne (1905–1976)

== Arms ==
Coat of arms of Baron Lyle of Westbourne

Crest
Upon a mascle fesswise Or interlaced with two sugar canes in saltire a cock Proper.
Escutcheon
Or a fess Gules fretty of the field between in chief two lions rampant Azure and in base a lymphad Sable flags flying Gules the sail charged with a thistle slipped and leaved also of the field.
Supporters
On the dexter side a lion Azure charged on the shoulder with a rose Or and on the sinister side a snowgoose wings endorsed Proper.
Motto
An I May

== See also ==
- Lyle Baronets
