= Andrew Lindsay =

British rower

Andrew Lindsay MBE
Personal information
- Born: Andrew James Ronald Lindsay; 25 March 1977 (age 49) Scotland
- Height: 6 ft 1 in (1.85 m)

Sport
- Country: Great Britain
- Sport: Men's rowing
- Event: Eights
- College team: Oxford University Boat Club
Medal record
Representing Great Britain
Men's rowing
Olympic Games
| Gold medal – first place | 2000 Sydney | Eight |

Andrew James Ronald Lindsay MBE (born 25 March 1977) is a British Olympic gold medal-winning rower and former co-CEO of Telecom Plus, which owns Utility Warehouse.

== Early life ==
Lindsay was educated at Eton College, where he first started rowing, and read geography at Brasenose College, Oxford. He rowed in the Oxford blue boat in The Boat Race three times, once as president of the boat club; and in The Childe of Hale, the First VIII of Brasenose College Boat Club.

== Rowing career ==
In 1994, Lindsay won bronze at the World Rowing Junior Championships in Munich.

He won a gold medal in the eight event at the 2000 Summer Olympics in Sydney, as a member of the British rowing team. He was appointed Member of the Order of the British Empire in the 2001 New Year Honours, for services to rowing.

== Business career ==
After his Olympic success, Lindsay announced his retirement from competitive rowing and went into business. He worked for Goldman Sachs for three years, and later was managing director of electrical retailer Ryness Electrical where he took part in a management buyout in 2006.

He joined Telecom Plus in 2007; he was the chief operating officer in 2009 and was promoted to chief executive officer in July 2010. Telecom Plus is a multi-utility which trades largely as Utility Warehouse and is a constituent of the FTSE 250 index. Lindsay held the CEO role jointly with Stuart Burnett from 2021, and in 2023 the company announced that Lindsay would step down at the 2024 AGM.
