= Constituency election results in the 1945 United Kingdom general election =

36th Parliament	(1931)
37th Parliament	(1935)
38th Parliament	(1945)
39th Parliament	(1950)
40th Parliament	(1951)

This is an incomplete alphabetical list of constituency election results to the 38th Parliament of the United Kingdom at the 1945 general election, held in July 1945.

== Notes ==
- Change in % vote and swing is calculated between the winner and second place and their respective performances at the 1935 election. A plus denotes a swing to the winner and a minus against the winner.

== England ==
=== London Boroughs ===
==== B ====
General election 1945: Balham and Tooting
Party	Candidate	Votes	%	±%
Labour	Richard Adams	19,782	57.6	+20.5
Conservative	Walter Stanley Edgson	14,552	42.4	−20.5
Majority		5,230	15.2	N/A
Turnout		34,334	70.9	+14.1
Labour gain from Conservative		Swing		

General election 1945: Battersea North
Party	Candidate	Votes	%	±%
Labour	Francis Douglas	14,070	73.9	+15.2
Conservative	John Serocold Paget Mellor	4,969	26.1	−15.2
Majority		9,101	47.8	+30.4
Turnout		19,039	71.1	+15.6
Labour hold		Swing		

General election 1945: Battersea South
Party	Candidate	Votes	%	±%
Labour Co-op	Caroline Ganley	19,275	61.53	
Conservative	Ernest Partridge	12,050	38.47	
Majority		7,225	23.06	N/A
Turnout		31,325	73.04	
Labour Co-op gain from Conservative		Swing		

General election 1945: Bermondsey West
Party	Candidate	Votes	%	±%
Labour	Richard Sargood	8,139	72.2	+10.0
National Liberal	W. Bernard Pemberton	2,238	19.8	−18.0
Liberal	Francis Howard Collier	903	8.0	New
Majority		5,901	52.4	+28.0
Turnout		17,004	66.3	+0.5
Labour hold		Swing	+14.0	

General election 1945: Bethnal Green North East
Party	Candidate	Votes	%	±%
Labour Co-op	Dan Chater	7,696	59.9	−3.6
Liberal	Paul Wright	3,979	30.9	−5.6
Conservative	William Sackville	1,185	9.2	New
Majority		3,717	29.0	+2.0
Turnout		19,225	66.9	+11.4
Labour Co-op hold		Swing	+1.0	

General election 1945: Bethnal Green South West
Party	Candidate	Votes	%	±%
Labour Co-op	Percy Holman	6,669	57.3	+10.4
Liberal	Percy Harris	4,213	36.2	−16.9
National	O. Howard Leicester	750	6.5	New
Majority		2,456	21.1	N/A
Turnout		11,632		
Labour gain from Liberal		Swing	+13.6	

General election 1945: Poplar, Bow and Bromley
Party	Candidate	Votes	%	±%
Labour	Charles Key	10,982	84.1	+7.1
Conservative	Charles Kenneth Duthie	2,075	15.9	−7.1
Majority		8,907	68.2	+14.2
Turnout		13,057	62.7	+3.2
Labour hold				

General election 1945: Brixton
Party	Candidate	Votes	%	±%
Labour	Marcus Lipton	15,583	63.6	+27.5
Conservative	Nigel Colman	8,928	36.4	−21.2
Majority		6,655	27.2	N/A
Turnout		37,493	65.4	+6.9
Labour gain from Conservative		Swing	+24.4	

==== C ====
General election 1945: Camberwell North
Party	Candidate	Votes	%	±%
Labour	Cecil Manning	7,186	76.6	+11.9
Conservative	Edward Rudolph Mayer	1,394	14.9	−17.9
Independent National	Thomas Frederick Rhodes Disher	794	8.5	New
Majority		5,792	61.7	+29.8
Turnout		15,506	60.5	+4.9
Labour hold		Swing		

General election 1945: Camberwell North West
Party	Candidate	Votes	%	±%
Labour	Freda Künzlen Corbet	12,251	69.6	+24.3
Conservative	L. Avon May	5,346	30.4	−18.2
Majority		6,905	39.2	N/A
Turnout		17,597	65.2	+5.9
Labour gain from Conservative		Swing	+21.2	

General election 1945: Chelsea
Party	Candidate	Votes	%	±%
Conservative	Allan Noble	12,043	63.7	−11.3
Labour	Margaret Douglas Shufeldt	5,874	31.1	+6.0
Common Wealth	Dorothy Anderton Sharpe	984	5.2	New
Majority		6,169	32.6	−17.3
Turnout		30,095	62.8	+1.1
Conservative hold		Swing	-8.6	

General election 1945: City of London (2 seats)
Party	Candidate	Votes	%	±%
National	Andrew Duncan	5,332	39.48	N/A
Conservative	George Broadbridge	5,309	39.31	N/A
Liberal	Andrew McFadyean	1,487	11.01	New
Independent	S. W. Alexander	1,379	10.21	New
Majority		3,822	28.30	N/A
Turnout		10,851	63.9	N/A
Conservative hold		Swing		

General election 1945: Clapham
Party	Candidate	Votes	%	±%
Labour	John Battley	15,205	54.17	
Conservative	Roy Lucas Lowndes	10,014	35.68	
Liberal	Charles Erik Paterson	2,850	10.15	New
Majority		5,191	18.49	N/A
Turnout		28,069	70.78	
Labour gain from Conservative		Swing		

==== M ====
Mile End
Party	Candidate	Votes	%	±%
Communist	Phil Piratin	5,075	47.6	new
Labour	Daniel Frankel	3,861	36.2	−21.0
Conservative	Vernon Motion	1,722	16.2	−26.6
Majority		1,214	11.4	n/a
Turnout		16,177	65.9	+2.4
Communist gain from Labour		Swing	n/a	

==== P ====
Paddington North
Party	Candidate	Votes	%	±%
Labour	Noel Mason-Macfarlane	16,638	61.2	+26.8
Conservative	Brendan Bracken	10,093	37.1	−22.3
Socialist (GB)	Clifford Groves	472	1.7	new
Majority		6,545	24.1	n/a
Turnout		27,203	71.0	+10.7
Labour gain from Conservative		Swing		

==== W ====
Westminster Abbey
Party	Candidate	Votes	%	±%
Conservative	Harold Webbe	9,160	54.4	−23.1
Labour	Jeremy Hutchinson	4,408	26.1	+3.6
Communist	Gabriel 'Billy' Carritt	2,964	17.6	n/a
Democratic	Norman Leith-Hay-Clark	326	1.9	n/a
Majority		4,752	28.3	−6.5
Turnout		28,823	58.5	+28.2
Conservative hold		Swing	n/a	

Westminster St George's
Party	Candidate	Votes	%	±%
Conservative	Arthur Howard	13,086	67.2	−17.4
Common Wealth	Wilfred Brown	5,314	27.3	n/a
Independent	Dorothy Crisp	1,069	5.5	n/a
Majority		7,772	39.9	−29.3
Turnout		19,469	57.2	+2.0
Conservative hold		Swing	n/a	

=== English boroughs ===
Portsmouth Central
Party	Candidate	Votes	%	±%
Labour	Julian Snow	14,745	55.3	+25.4
Conservative	Ralph Beaumont	11,345	42.6	−17.4
Democratic	Walter Robert C Foster	561	2.1	n/a
Majority		3,400	12.7	42.8
Turnout			73.5	+2.4
Labour gain from Conservative		Swing	+21.4	

Portsmouth North
Party	Candidate	Votes	%	±%
Labour	Donald Bruce	15,352	51.1	+17.7
Conservative	Greville Howard	14,310	47.6	−19.0
Democratic	John Edward Vincent Keast	388	1.3	n/a
Majority		1,042	3.5	36.7
Turnout			75.4	+10.5
Labour gain from Conservative		Swing	+18.3	

- ignores by-election in 1943

Sheffield Ecclesall
Party	Candidate	Votes	%	±%
Conservative	Peter Roberts	18,120	54.0	−19.4
Common Wealth	Sydney Checkland	12,045	35.9	n/a
Liberal	Philip Rodney Nightingale	3,391	10.1	n/a
Majority		6,075	18.1	−29.1
Turnout			75.6	−4.6
Conservative hold		Swing	n/a	

=== English shires ===
Aldershot
Party	Candidate	Votes	%	±%
Conservative	Oliver Lyttelton	19,456	57.4	−16.0
Common Wealth	Tom Wintringham	14,435	42.6	n/a
Majority		5,021	14.8	−32.0
Turnout		33,891	69.2	n/a
Conservative hold		Swing	n/a	

Bewdley
Party	Candidate	Votes	%	±%
Conservative	Roger Conant	17,393	55.0	n/a
Liberal	Gerald Samson	14,223	45.0	n/a
Majority		3,170	10.0	n/a
Turnout		31,616	67.5	n/a
Conservative hold		Swing		

Bridgwater
Party	Candidate	Votes	%	±%
Independent Progressive	Vernon Bartlett	17,937	45.8	n/a
Conservative	Gerald Wills	15,625	39.9	−17.0
Labour	Norman Corkhill	5,613	14.3	−5.5
Majority		2,312	5.9	
Turnout		39,175	72.7	−0.0
Independent Progressive hold		Swing		

Buckrose
Party	Candidate	Votes	%	±%
Liberal	George Wadsworth	15,934	51.5	+6.6
Conservative	Albert Braithwaite	14,985	48.5	−6.6
Majority		949	3.0	n/a
Turnout		30,919	71.9	−6.5
Liberal gain from Conservative		Swing	+6.6	

Chelmsford
Party	Candidate	Votes	%	±%
Common Wealth	Ernest Millington	27,309	46.7	n/a
Conservative	Hubert Ashton	25,229	43.2	−27.6
Liberal	Hilda Buckmaster	5,909	10.1	n/a
Majority		2,080	3.6	
Turnout			73.4	+8.0
Common Wealth gain from Conservative		Swing		

- ignores by-election

Cheltenham
Party	Candidate	Votes	%	±%
Ind. Conservative	Daniel Lipson	16,081	43.3	n/a
Labour	Phyllis Maude Warner	11,095	29.9	+0.4
Conservative	W. W. Hicks Beach	9,972	26.8	−45.7
Majority		4,986	13.4	−27.6
Turnout		37,148	75.4	+5.0
Ind. Conservative hold		Swing	+7.6	

Chichester
Party	Candidate	Votes	%	±%
Conservative	Lancelot Joynson-Hicks	30,989	54.6	−23.7
Labour	Rosalie Francesca Chamberlayne	13,670	24.1	+2.4
Liberal	Gerald Kidd	11,345	20.0	n/a
National	Michael Henry Woodard	625	1.1	n/a
Democratic	Paul Tracy Carter	118	0.2	n/a
Majority		17,319	30.5	−26.1
Turnout			68.2	+8.7
Conservative hold		Swing	−13.0	

- ignores by-election in 1942

Dorset Northern
Party	Candidate	Votes	%	±%
Liberal	Frank Byers	14,444	53.7	+15.8
Conservative	Richard Glyn	12,479	46.3	−3.8
Majority		1,965	7.40	n/a
Turnout		26,923	75.04	−4.9
Liberal gain from Conservative		Swing		

Eccles
Party	Candidate	Votes	%	±%
Labour	William Proctor	23,008	51.1	+3.8
Conservative	Robert Cary	15,562	34.6	−18.1
Liberal	Arthur Gerald Pollitt	6,215	13.8	new
Independent Progressive	Aubrey Bernard Brocklehurst	211	0.5	new
Majority		7,446	16.5	n/a
Turnout		44,996		
Labour gain from Conservative		Swing	+10.9	

Edmonton
Party	Candidate	Votes	%	±%
Labour	Evan Durbin	33,163	68.2	+13.0
Conservative	Geoffrey Maber Sparrow	14,094	29.0	−15.8
Independent Progressive	John Alfred Ward	1,382	2.8	new
Majority		19,069	39.2	+28.8
Turnout		48,639	69.0	+4.5
Labour hold		Swing		

Evesham
Party	Candidate	Votes	%	±%
Conservative	Rupert De la Bère	17,835	53.4	−11.7
Liberal	Duncan McGuffie	7,849	23.5	+10.4
Common Wealth	Desmond Donnelly	7,727	23.1	n/a
Majority		9,986	29.9	−13.4
Turnout			63.3	−3.1
Conservative hold		Swing	−11.1	

Grantham
Party	Candidate	Votes	%	±%
Independent	Denis Kendall	27,719	58.2	n/a
Conservative	George Arthur Worth	12,206	25.6	−32.5
Labour	Thomas Sansby Bavin	7,728	16.2	−25.7
Majority		15,513	32.6	n/a
Turnout		47,653	75.9	+1.7
Independent hold		Swing		

Hastings
Party	Candidate	Votes	%	±%
Conservative	Neill Cooper-Key	14,105	51.8	−17.2
Labour	Lewis Gassman	10,580	38.8	+7.8
Independent Progressive	Sydney Muller Parkman	2,564	9.4	new
Majority		3,525	13.0	−25.0
Turnout		27,249	74.9	+8.4
Conservative hold		Swing		

Maidstone
Party	Candidate	Votes	%	±%
Conservative	Alfred Bossom	21,320	53.3	−19.2
Labour	Otto Leslie Shaw	18,295	45.7	+18.2
Democratic	George Murray	416	1.0	n/a
Majority		3,025	7.6	−37.4
Turnout			71.0	+3.6
Conservative hold		Swing	−18.7	

Petersfield
Party	Candidate	Votes	%	±%
Conservative	George Jeffreys	20,838	58.4	−20.7
Liberal	Basil Goldstone	8,269	23.2	n/a
Common Wealth	Thomas Sargant	6,600	18.5	n/a
Majority		12,569	35.2	−22.9
Turnout			64.4	+1.0
Conservative hold		Swing	n/a	

- ignores by-election

Rugby
Party	Candidate	Votes	%	±%
Independent	William Brown	18,615	40.4	n/a
Conservative	John Lakin	17,049	37.0	−24.6
Labour	Ronald Lewis	10,470	22.7	−15.8
Majority		1,566	3.4	n/a
Turnout		46,144	73.6	−0.2
Independent gain from Conservative		Swing		

Thirsk and Malton
Party	Candidate	Votes	%	±%
Conservative	Robert Turton	20,483	60.1	n/a
Common Wealth	Edward Moeran	13,572	39.8	n/a
Majority		6,911	20.3	n/a
Turnout			65.5	n/a
Conservative hold		Swing	n/a	

Wallasey
Party	Candidate	Votes	%	±%
Conservative	Ernest Marples	18,448	42.94	+9.74
Independent	George Reakes	14,638	34.07	−24.53
Labour Co-op	Thomas Findley	9,879	22.99	−9.57
Majority		3,810	8.87	
Turnout		42,965	75.23	
Conservative gain from Independent		Swing	17.13	

== Scotland ==
=== Scottish burghs ===
Aberdeen North
Party	Candidate	Votes	%	±%
Labour	Hector Hughes	26,753	69.7	+21.0
Unionist	Grant of Monymusk	9,623	25.1	−15.1
SNP	Austin William Walker	2,021	5.3	n/a
Majority		17,130	44.6	+36.1
Turnout			67.5	+1.6
Labour hold		Swing	+18.0	

Edinburgh East
Party	Candidate	Votes	%	±%
Labour	Frederick Pethick-Lawrence	19,300	56.4	+13.2
Unionist	William Angus Sinclair	12,771	37.3	−2.3
SNP	Frederick Cameron Yeaman	2,149	6.3	n/a
Majority		6,529	19.1	+15.5
Turnout			69.6	+1.0
Labour hold		Swing	+7.7	

Glasgow Kelvingrove
Party	Candidate	Votes	%	±%
Labour	John Williams	12,273	46.0	−2.1
Unionist	Walter Elliot	12,185	45.7	−3.0
SNP	Hugh MacDiarmid	1,314	4.9	n/a
Liberal	Charles John Edwin Morgan	919	3.4	+0.2
Majority		88	0.3	+0.9
Turnout			61.7	−10.8
Labour gain from Unionist		Swing	+0.4	

Kirkcaldy Burghs
Party	Candidate	Votes	%	±%
Labour	Thomas Hubbard	15,401	45.0	−11.3
Unionist	Christopher Guest	10,099	29.5	−14.2
SNP	Douglas Young	5,811	17.0	n/a
Communist	John McArthur	2,898	8.47	n/a
Majority		5,302	15.5	+2.9
Turnout		34,209	76.4	−3.5
Labour hold		Swing	+1.4	

- ignores the by-election of 1944

=== Scottish shires ===
Galloway
Party	Candidate	Votes	%	±%
Ind. Unionist	John Mackie	13,647	40.7	n/a
Labour	Robert Neale Hales	11,822	35.3	new
Unionist	Bernard Edward Fergusson	8,032	24.0	
Majority		1,825	5.4	n/a
Turnout		33,501	70.1	
Ind. Unionist gain from Unionist		Swing		

West Fife
Party	Candidate	Votes	%	±%
Communist	Willie Gallacher	17,636	42.1	+4.7
Labour	Willie Hamilton	15,580	37.3	+1.6
National Liberal	Robert Scott Stevenson	8,597	20.6	−6.3
Majority		2,056	4.8	+3.1
Turnout		41,813	75.4	−2.4
Communist hold		Swing		

Motherwell
Party	Candidate	Votes	%	±%
Labour	Alexander Anderson	15,831	52.7	+2.0
SNP	Robert McIntyre	8,022	26.7	n/a
Unionist	John d'Henin Hamilton	6,197	20.6	−28.7
Majority		7,809	26.0	+24.7
Turnout			72.8	−3.1
Labour hold		Swing	n/a	

- ignores the by-election of April 1945

Perth
Party	Candidate	Votes	%	±%
Unionist	Alan Gomme-Duncan	22,484	63.1	−10.6
Labour	William Hughes	11,617	32.6	+6.3
SNP	James Blair Brown	1,547	4.3	n/a
Majority		10,867	30.5	+16.9
Turnout			65.7	+1.6
Unionist hold		Swing	−8.5	

Renfrewshire West
Party	Candidate	Votes	%	±%
Labour	Thomas Scollan	15,050	48.9	+10.1
Unionist	Henry Scrymgeour-Wedderburn	13,836	44.9	−4.8
SNP	Robert Blair Wilkie	1,995	6.3	−5.2
Majority		1,214	3.9	14.8
Turnout		30,841	70.0	−11.2
Labour gain from Unionist		Swing	+7.4	

== Wales ==
Caernarvon Boroughs
Party	Candidate	Votes	%	±%
Conservative	David Price-White	11,432	32.9	−0.5
Liberal	Seaborne Davies	11,096	32.0	−34.6
Labour	Elwyn Jones	10,625	30.6	n/a
Plaid Cymru	John Edward Daniel	1,560	4.5	n/a
Majority		336	0.9	34.1
Turnout		34,713	73.8	+15.0
Conservative gain from Liberal		Swing		

- ignores the by-election of May 1945

Caernarvonshire
Party	Candidate	Votes	%	±%
Labour	Goronwy Roberts	22,043	55.3	+10.8
Liberal	Goronwy Owen	15,637	39.3	−9.3
Plaid Cymru	Ambrose Bebb	2,152	5.4	−1.5
Majority		6,406	16.1	20.1
Turnout			77.7	+2.8
Labour gain from Liberal		Swing	+10.0	

Carmarthen
Party	Candidate	Votes	%	±%
Liberal	Rhys Hopkin Morris	19,783	51.7	+17.9
Labour	Moelwyn Hughes	18,504	48.3	+0.8
Majority		1,279	3.4	n/a
Turnout		38,286	76.1	−3.2
Liberal gain from Labour		Swing		

Merioneth
Party	Candidate	Votes	%	±%
Liberal	Emrys Roberts	8,495	35.8	−4.2
Labour	Huw Morris Jones	8,383	35.4	+0.2
Conservative	Craig Parry Hughes	4,374	18.5	−6.3
Plaid Cymru	Gwynfor Evans	2,448	10.3	n/a
Majority		112	0.4	−4.5
Turnout			82.2	+0.6
Liberal hold		Swing	−2.2	

Neath
Party	Candidate	Votes	%	±%
Labour	D. J. Williams	37,957	75.8	n/a
National Liberal	David J Bowen	8,466	16.9	n/a
Plaid Cymru	Wynne Samuel	3,659	7.3	n/a
Majority		29,491	58.9	n/a
Turnout			75.7	n/a
Labour hold		Swing	n/a	

- ignores the by-election of May 1945

Ogmore
Party	Candidate	Votes	%	±%
Labour	Edward Williams	32,715	76.4	n/a
National	Owen Glyndwr Davies	7,712	18.0	n/a
Plaid Cymru	Trefor Richard Morgan	2,379	5.6	n/a
Majority		25,003	58.4	n/a
Turnout			75.7	n/a
Labour hold		Swing	n/a	

Rhondda East
Party	Candidate	Votes	%	±%
Labour	William Mainwaring	16,733	48.4	−13.4
Communist	Harry Pollitt	15,761	45.5	+ 7.3
Plaid Cymru	James Kitchener Davies	2,123	6.1	n/a
Majority		972	2.9	−20.7
Turnout			82.8	+ 2.0
Labour hold		Swing	−10.3	

== Northern Ireland ==
Belfast South
Party	Candidate	Votes	%	±%
UUP	Conolly Gage	24,282	52.2	n/a
Commonwealth Labour	Harry Midgley	14,096	30.3	new
NI Labour	James Morrow	8,166	17.5	new
Majority		10,186	21.9	n/a
Turnout		46,544	66.4	n/a
UUP hold		Swing	n/a	

== Universities ==
Cambridge University (2 seats)
Party	Candidate	FPv%	Count			
Party	Candidate	FPv%	1	2	3	4
Conservative	Kenneth Pickthorn	46.18	10,202			
Independent	Wilson Harris	16.18	3,574	4,709	5,185	6,556
Independent Progressive	J. B. Priestley	22.82	5,041	5,128	5,238	5,745
Independent	Charles Hill	10.13	2,238	3,092	3,595	eliminated
National	Ernest Leslie Howard-Williams	4.69	1,036	1,798	eliminated	–
Electorate: 42,012 Valid: 22,091 Quota: 7,364 Turnout: 52.58

Combined English Universities (2 seats)
Party	Candidate	FPv%	Count				
Party	Candidate	FPv%	1	2	3	4	5
Independent Progressive	Eleanor Rathbone	53.3	11,176				
Independent	Kenneth Lindsay	9.2	1,923	3,503	3,856	4,528	5,826
Independent Labour	Stanley Wormald	15.3	3,212	3,973	4,081	4,473	4,675
National	Eric Cuthbert Arden	11.6	2,433	3,073	3,389	3,829	eliminated
Independent	John Henry Richardson	5.3	1,124	1,995	2,341	eliminated	
Independent	A. Russell Foxall	5.3	1,105	1,437	eliminated		
Electorate: 41,976 Valid: 20,973 Quota: 6,992 Turnout: 50.0

London University
Party	Candidate	Votes	%	±%
National	Ernest Graham-Little	7,618	50.5	−19.1
Independent Progressive	Mary Stocks	7,469	49.5	new
Majority		149	1.0	−38.2
Turnout		15,087	63.0	−8.7
National hold		Swing	n/a	

University of Wales
Party	Candidate	Votes	%	±%
Liberal	William John Gruffydd	5,239	75.5	+4.2
Plaid Cymru	Gwenan Jones	1,696	24.5	n/a
Majority		3,543	51.0	+28.4
Turnout		6,935	58.5	−3.8
Liberal hold		Swing	n/a	

- ignores the by-election of 1943
