= Minnie Pallister =

English political activist (1885–1960)

- Minnie Pallister in 1923
- Born: 12 March 1885; Kilkhampton, Cornwall, England
- Died: 26 March 1960 (aged 75)
- Occupations: Political activist, writer, broadcaster

Minnie Pallister (12 March 1885 – 26 March 1960) was an English political activist, political writer, self-described "Socialist propagandist", unsuccessful political candidate for the Independent Labour Party, and radio personality.

Pallister was born in Cornwall, and was the daughter of a clergyman. She was trained as a teacher at Cardiff University, and worked for a decade as a schoolteacher in a Welsh elementary school. She joined the Independent Labour Party during its affiliation to the Labour Party, and in 1914 became the president of the party's federation in Monmouthshire.

During World War I, Pallister helped organise the pacifist organization No-Conscription Fellowship. Also during the war, she was an active orator for the causes of peace and labour. In the general elections of 1923 and 1924, Pallister was an unsuccessful candidate for the Bournemouth constituency in Hampshire.

Due to health problems, Pallister retired from active politics in the 1920s. In the 1920s, she wrote a number of books on the topic of socialism. In the 1930s, she wrote books about gardening. In 1936, Pallister joined the pacifist organisation Peace Pledge Union, and in 1945 she was elected as a member of the organization's council. In the 1950s, Pallister was affiliated with BBC Radio as a regular contributor in the radio magazine programme Woman's Hour. She died in 1960, at the age of 75.

== Early life and education ==
Minnie Pallister was born in Kilkhampton, Cornwall, the middle of three daughters of William and Rose (née Parsons) Pallister. Her father was a clergyman. She attended Tasker's High School for Girls and earned a teaching credential at Cardiff University.

== Career ==
Minnie Pallister taught for ten years in an elementary school in Brynmawr, where she became familiar with Welsh working lives. Her piano skills were also welcomed by local musicians. By 1914 she was president of the Monmouthshire Federation of the Independent Labour Party (the first woman elected to that position), and serving on the Breconshire Education Committee. Keir Hardie described her "like a new meteor on the horizon" for her eloquence.

In World War I and later she was busy as a speaker for the peace and labour movements, and organised the No-Conscription Fellowship in Wales. In 1922, as ILP organiser for South Wales, she was quoted on the front page of the Labour Leader declaring: "We were right on the War. We were right on the Peace. We were right on Reparations." She was advertised as "Wales' Greatest Woman Orator" in newspaper announcements. She also ran for office several times in the 1920s, and was quoted about Ramsay MacDonald in The New York Times in 1924. She acted as his agent until 1926, when illness forced her to mostly withdraw from public life.

Pallister stood in Bournemouth at the general elections in 1923 and 1924. In 1923, Pallister gained 5,986 votes, 19.5% of the votes cast. She finished third among the candidates, behind Henry Page Croft of the Unionist Party (with 50.4% of the votes) and Cyril Berkeley Dallow of the Liberal Party (with 30.1% of the votes). In 1924, Pallister gained 7,735 votes, 27.3% of the votes cast. She finished second among candidates, behind Henry Page Croft of the Unionist Party (with 72.7% of the votes).

Pallister's health suffered from her constant activity, and she was advised by doctors to change her schedule. She became a full-time writer, though she remained interested in political matters. "My politics are me," she said, "it seems almost impossible that there should still be people who believe that politics do not matter." A lifelong pacifist, she joined the Peace Pledge Union in 1936, was elected to its Council in 1945 and later became a Sponsor. She started in radio broadcasting in 1938 and was a regular contributor to the Woman's Hour BBC radio programme in the 1950s.

== Works ==
She was a journalist for the Daily Herald and the Daily Mirror newspapers in the 1930s. Pallister wrote 600 articles, over 150 radio scripts, numerous pamphlets, and five books, including an autobiographical account.

The books included Socialism for Women (pamphlet, 1923); The Orange Box: Thoughts of a Socialist Propagandist (1924); Socialism, Equality and Happiness (pamphlet, 1925); Rain on the Corn and Other Sketches (1928); Gardener's Frenzy: Being an Alphabet of the Garden (1933); and A Cabbage for a Year (1934).

== Death ==
Minnie Pallister died on 26 March 1960, aged 75. Towards the end of her life, an unspecified illness had forced her to retire from political activities. At the time of her death, she was mainly active as a radio broadcaster.

== Legacy ==
In September 2024 a Purple Plaque was placed on the Market Hall (now Brynmawr Museum) Brynmawr to celebrate her life.

== Sources ==
- British Parliamentary Election Results 1918-1949, compiled and edited by F.W.S. Craig (Macmillan Press, revised edition 1977)
