= Confederacy (British political group) =

Secret society within the Conservative Party

The Confederacy was a society within the British Conservative Party that enthusiastically promoted Joseph Chamberlain's campaign for tariff reform. A founder of the society, Henry Page Croft, later wrote, "It was started by three or four of us who held the view that nothing was worth fighting for except Chamberlain's battle, and we determined to do our best to drive the enemies of tariff reform out of the Conservative Party".

It was a secret society, according to Croft, "to appear much more important than we in fact were. Our idea was to endeavour to get large numbers of young men drawn from the aristocracy and country gentlemen who would devote themselves to the cause and fight constituencies wherever and whenever they were required". At its height, it numbered around 50 members, with 30 entering Parliament, 9 gaining office and 4 becoming Cabinet ministers. Sir Arthur Steel-Maitland was a member. Edward Goulding was closely connected with the Confederacy.

Its first meetings were held at Fanhams Hall. The organisational skills of Thomas Comyn Platt and others ensured the Confederacy received national attention in the press and elsewhere.

== See also ==
- Secret society

== Sources ==
- Alan Sykes, ‘The Confederacy and the Purge of the Unionist Free Traders, 1906-10’, Historical Journal, xviii, 2 (1975), pp. 349–366.
- L. Witherell, Rebel on the Right: Henry Page Croft and the Crisis of British Conservatism, 1903–1914 (1997).
