= 1945 Bournemouth by-election =

UK Parliamentary by-election

The 1945 Bournemouth by-election was held on 15 November 1945. The by-election was held due to the elevation to hereditary peerage of the incumbent Conservative MP, Sir Leonard Lyle. It was won by the Conservative candidate Brendan Bracken, who was a prominent supporter of Winston Churchill and Conservative parliamentarian who had lost his Paddington North seat to Labour in the 1945 Labour landslide. Somewhat unusually, there was a significant swing to the governing party, with Labour achieving a swing of more than 10%.

This election had the biggest swing for an incumbent governing party in a by-election until the 2021 Hartlepool by-election.

Bournemouth by-election, 1945
Party	Candidate	Votes	%	±%
Unionist	Brendan Bracken	22,980	46.85	−8.60
Labour	Edward Shackleton	16,526	33.69	+11.98
Liberal	Basil Wigoder	9,548	19.46	−3.39
Majority		6,454	13.16	−19.44
Turnout		49,054	56.5	−14.8
Conservative hold		Swing	-10.3	
