= Sir Archibald Lyle, 2nd Baronet =

Scottish rugby union player & cricketer

Personal information
- Full name: Archibald Moir Park Lyle
- Born: 5 February 1884; Greenock, Renfrewshire, Scotland
- Died: 4 December 1946 (aged 62); Marylebone, London, England
- Batting: Unknown
- Bowling: Unknown

Domestic team information
- Years: Team
- 1904–1906: Oxford University
- 1912: Scotland

Career statistics
Competition	First-class
Matches	3
Runs scored	77
Batting average	12.83
100s/50s	–/–
Top score	27
Balls bowled	42
Wickets	0
Bowling average	–
5 wickets in innings	–
10 wickets in match	–
Best bowling	–
Catches/stumpings	2/–
- Source: Cricinfo, 22 May 2020

Sir Archibald Moir Park Lyle, 2nd Baronet, MC, TD, DL, JP (5 February 1884 – 4 December 1946) was a Scottish first-class cricketer, British Army officer and ship owner.

== Early life and cricket ==
The son of Alexander Park Lyle, he was born at Greenock in February 1884. He was educated at Fettes College, before going up to Trinity College, Oxford. While studying at Oxford, he played first-class cricket for Oxford University in 1904 and 1906, making two appearances at Oxford against Worcestershire and the Marylebone Cricket Club. He scored 67 runs in these two matches, with a high score of 27. Lyle was also a successful athlete while at Oxford, representing the university in 110 metres hurdles and shot put against Cambridge from 1904–06. He competed against Harvard and Yale in 1904. Lyle played rugby union for Oxford University RFC from 1902–05.

After graduating from Oxford, Lyle was commissioned in the British Army in October 1906 as a second lieutenant in the Scottish Horse Imperial Yeomanry, which was renamed the Scottish Horse in 1908. He married Dorothy de Hoghton, daughter of Sir James de Hoghton, in November 1908. He was promoted to lieutenant in April 1911. Lyle appeared in his third and final first-class cricket appearance in 1912, when he played for Scotland against the touring Australians at Raeburn Place. Batting twice in the match, he was dismissed in the Scotland first innings by Bill Whitty for 5 runs, while in their second innings he was dismissed for the same bowler for 10 runs, the second highest score in the Scottish innings of 52 all out. Weeks prior to the commencement of the First World War, he was promoted to captain.

== World War I and later life ==
Lyle served during the First World War with the Scottish Horse, becoming a temporary major in October 1915, which he relinquished in August 1917. In January 1918, he was awarded the Military Cross for conspicuous gallantry and devotion to duty while leading a company during an attack with the Scottish Horse as part of the Mediterranean Expeditionary Force. He was again made a temporary major in August 1918, while in 2nd in command, which he relinquished following the war in May 1919. Lyle spent the early part of 1920 away from the military, travelling around British India with his family. He returned from Calcutta aboard the steamship SS Khyber in April, having been promoted to major in the Scottish Horse in February. He was conferred the Territorial Decoration in October 1921 and was later promoted to lieutenant colonel in July 1924. In June 1928, he was made a brevet colonel, before retiring from active service in October of the same year, retaining the rank of lieutenant colonel.

Upon the death of his father in December 1933, he succeeded as the 2nd Baronet of the Lyle baronets, in addition to inheriting the Lyle Shipping Company. He served as a deputy lieutenant of Perthshire in 1937, and was appointed vice-lieutenant in June 1940. During his life he was a member of the Royal Company of Archers, the King's Bodyguard For Scotland, in addition to serving as a justice of the peace. Lyle died at Marylebone in December 1946. With his son, Ian Archibald de Hoghton Lyle (son-in-law of John Yarde-Buller, 3rd Baron Churston), being killed in action during the Second World War, he was succeeded in the baronetcy by his grandson, Gavin Lyle, stepson of Ian Russell, 13th Duke of Bedford.

Baronetage of the United Kingdom
Preceded by Sir Alexander Lyle	Baronet (of Glendelvine); 1933–1946	Succeeded by Sir Gavin Lyle
