= Tom Groves =

British politician

Tom Groves MP

Member of Parliament for Stratford West Ham
- In office 15 November 1922 – 15 June 1945
- Preceded by: Leonard Lyle
- Succeeded by: Henry Nicholls

Personal details
- Born: Thomas Edward Groves; 1884
- Died: 29 May 1958 (aged 73–74)
- Party: Labour
- Children: 1

Thomas Edward Groves (1884 – 29 May 1958) was a British Labour Party politician.

He was elected at the 1922 general election as Member of Parliament (MP) for Stratford division of West Ham, and held the seat until 1945. He had wanted to stand again at the 1945 general election, but his name was not sent on to the selection conference which chose Henry Nicholls as the Labour Party candidate. Groves announced that his son would stand as an independent candidate, but when his son withdrew he stood for re-election, and was promptly expelled from his local Labour Party.

Parliament of the United Kingdom
| Preceded by Leonard Lyle | Member of Parliament for Stratford; 1922 – 1945 | Succeeded by Henry Nicholls |
