= Telecom Plus =

British utility company

Telecom Plus plc
- Type: Public
- Traded as: LSE: TEP; FTSE 250 component
- ISIN: GB0008794710
- Industry: Public utility
- Founded: 1996; 30 years ago
- Headquarters: London
- Key people: Charles Wigoder (Executive Chairman); Stuart Burnett (Co-CEO)
- Products: Landline telephony, mobile telephony, broadband, gas, electricity, home insurance.
- Revenue: ▲£1,941.1 million (2026)
- Operating income: ▲£125.4 million (2026)
- Net income: ▲£80.7 million (2026)
- Number of employees: 2,291 (2025)
- Subsidiaries: Telecommunications Management Limited; Utility Warehouse Limited
- Website: telecomplus.co.uk

Telecom Plus plc is a British multi-utility supplier of gas, electricity, home insurance, and landline, broadband and mobile services to residences and businesses. It is listed on the London Stock Exchange and is a constituent of the FTSE 250 Index. Telecom Plus trades as consumer brand Utility Warehouse.

== History ==
The company was founded in 1996 as a telecommunications business. Its first product, launched in 1997, was a least cost call routing 'Smart Box', a gadget that plugs into a phone socket and routes the calls to alternative networks at a cheaper rate than British Telecom.

In 2017, the company sold its 20% stake in Opus Energy to Drax Group.

In October 2023, the company had over 949,000 customers.

In December 2025, it was reported that the company was vying to take a stake in UK energy provider OVO Energy.

In June 2026, the company reported it had over 1,430,000 customers, providing 3,800,000 services to these customers. The company also reported it had over 77,000 Partners, who sign up customers to their services.

== Key people ==
Andrew Lindsay, a world-class rower who was a member of the gold medallist British team at the 2000 Olympics, joined Telecom Plus in 2007. He was the chief operating officer in 2009 and was promoted to chief executive officer in July 2010. Lindsay held the CEO role jointly with Stuart Burnett from 2021, and in 2023 the company announced that Lindsay would step down at the 2024 AGM.

== Operations ==
The company has two subsidiaries:

- Utility Warehouse operates a landline telephony service, mobile telephony (as an MVNO on the EE network), supplies broadband, gas and electricity and offers home insurance. Utility Warehouse also offers a pre-paid debit card which pays a "cashback" percentage on purchases (given as a credit against the monthly bill for other Utility Warehouse services) in return for a monthly fee. The cards are operated by Mastercard and issued by PSI-Pay Ltd, a privately held company.
- Telecommunications Management Limited provides a landline telephony service to small and medium-sized enterprise (SME) customers, as well as operating the 1pMobile consumer MVNO.

The company uses self-employed partners to sign-up new customers.
