= Reveille (British political group) =

Reveille was a group within the British Conservative Party designed to pressure the party into a policy of imperialism and social reform.

The origins of the group lay in the frustration of some Conservatives with what they perceived as the Party's negative defence of the status quo under the leadership of Arthur Balfour in response to the Liberal government's People's Budget. On 30 August 1910 the Conservative MP Henry Page Croft published an article in The Morning Post headed “Reveille”. He said that a "sleeping sickness" had permeated the ranks of the party, that the prospect of a Canadian trade agreement with America was dangerous for British trade and industry and that what was needed was Imperial Preference.

Soon afterwards, fellow Conservatives asked Croft to organise a campaign throughout the country. Consequently, a considerable fund was raised and Conservative Associations in the major cities organised mass meetings for Reveille members. Soon there were 100 peers and MPs in the Reveille and there was a dinner held at Princes restaurant, Piccadilly, where Croft and Lord Willoughby de Broke spoke. Present were Acland Hood, the Conservative Chief Whip, and Percival Hughes, the Conservative Chief Agent. Willoughby de Broke outlined Reveille's programme:

(1) Defence.—Maintenance of the supremacy of the Navy and an adequate Army. The naval programme to be completed, if necessary, by a naval loan.
(2) Trade Reform.—A scientific tariff to be framed for the defence of British industries against unfair foreign competition, coupled with a scheme of industrial insurance.
(3) Empire Union.—Imperial Preference for the establishment of trade partnership throughout the Empire to be immediately initiated.
(4) Land Reform.—Small ownership for which facilities may be granted to working men to purchase land on easy terms, with the assistance of Government credit.
(5) Poor Law Reform to meet modern conditions.
