= Charles Wigoder =

English telecommunications entrepreneur

Charles Francis Wigoder (born 2 March 1960) is an English telecommunications entrepreneur, associated with building both Peoples Phone and Telecom Plus (The Utility Warehouse) into substantial and successful businesses.

== Biography ==
The son of The Right Honourable Lord Wigoder, QC PC (his children are entitled to use The Honourable title), Wigoder studied accountancy and law at University of Kent.

Wigoder qualified as a chartered accountant with KPMG in 1984 and was subsequently employed by Kleinwort Securities as an investment analyst in the media and communication sectors, where he met Michael Green. Green later hired Wigoder in 1985 as head of corporate finance and development at television services company Carlton Communications, to accelerate the growth of the organisation; whilst he was there, turnover grew from under £5m to over £200m. He subsequently moved to Sangers Photographic, a USM listed wholesaler of photographic equipment, where he was responsible for rebranding the business as Quadrant Group. He took the business to a full stock market listing, and expanded its activities to encompass three separate divisions covering photographic, video and communications services.

=== Peoples Phone ===
Wigoder left Quadrant to set up Cellular Communications Corporation plc in March 1988, initially providing a mobile phone service to business customers through both a direct sales team and third party distributors. He recognised how consumers had the potential to transform the market, successfully positioning his company to take advantage of this opportunity by creating the Peoples Phone brand as the world's first virtual mobile network. To support this new type of customer, he established his own national High Street retail presence by opening more than 180 showrooms throughout the UK in just 12 months (a distribution model subsequently imitated by all the network operators), gaining around 10% of the UK market. Within four years he had built a market-leading position, having overtaken all the other independent resellers who had started several years prior to his entry into the market. The business was highly cash generative, but a decision to write off all customer acquisition costs directly against profits meant that the company reported a loss after taxation of £10.6m on turnover of £175m for the financial year ended 31 October 1995.

Following a disagreement between the major shareholders on the future strategy for the company, it was acquired by Vodafone in November 1996 for £77m; however, Wigoder only collected £6.5M from the deal, as most of the company was owned by venture capital investors. Vodafone followed this deal with further acquisitions within the sector (namely Astec and Talkland in December 1996) giving it greater control over the customers using its network. According to Vodafone's 1997 annual report and accounts, Peoples Phone made £4.1m in the period to end of 1996.

=== Telecom Plus/Utility Warehouse ===
Wigoder joined Telecom Plus shortly after its formation in 1998, investing heavily and listing it on the London Stock Exchange.

Wigoder believed there was a significant opportunity to build a business supplying communications and energy services to the mass residential market, in competition with the former monopoly providers of such services, as de-regulation progressively opened up these sectors. It was clear to him that a low-cost route to market would prove to be a critical element in any successful business model, and he therefore invested in Telecom Plus plc, which had an established network marketing system of agents across the United Kingdom to promote their services. Since 1998, the company has gained more than 1,000,000 domestic and small-business customers through combining better value with consistently high standards of customer service. Trading as Utility Warehouse, Telecom Plus is a "virtual" retailer, with no shops and no advertising, supported by a sophisticated head office infrastructure with more than 1000 staff (most of whom are employed to support their customers). By 2013, the business had over 37,000 independent distributors.

In 2001, Wigoder was the winner of the Communications category in the London section of the UK "Entrepreneur of the Year" awards sponsored by Ernst & Young, Citibank and the Times, and in 2009, he collected the award for Company of the Year at the Quoted Company Awards on behalf of Telecom Plus plc.

In July 2022, Wigoder moved to a non-executive role with Telecom Plus.

== Personal life ==
Wigoder is married to Elizabeth, and the couple have a son and three daughters. Wigoder is an expert bridge player who won the prestigious Cavendish Invitational Teams in 2004.

Wigoder has supported the Conservative Party and gave a direct donation to Liam Fox in his 2005 leadership bid to replace Michael Howard, running against David Cameron He later lent the Conservatives £100,000 as a beneficial loan, as outlined in the 31 March 2006 statement by party chairman Francis Maude. The Financial Times reported that a company linked to him donated £100,000 to the Conservative Party's 2024 UK general election campaign.

In the summer of 2013, Wigoder donated £1 million to the Kent Law Campaign to help build a new home for the University of Kent's Kent Law Clinic. This has been named the Wigoder Law Building.
