= Basil Wigoder =

British barrister and Liberal politician (1921–2004)

The Right Honourable The Lord Wigoder QC

Member of the House of Lords Lord Temporal
- Life peerage 16 May 1974 – 12 August 2004

Liberal Chief Whip in the House of Lords
- In office 1977–1984

Chairman of the Liberal Party Executive
- In office 1963–1965
- Leader: Jo Grimond
- Preceded by: Desmond Banks
- Succeeded by: Gruffydd Evans

Personal details
- Born: 12 February 1921 Manchester, England
- Died: 12 August 2004 (aged 83) London, England
- Party: Liberal
- Spouse: Yoland Levinson (m. 1948)
- Children: 4 (including Charles Wigoder)
- Education: Oriel College, Oxford

Basil Thomas Wigoder, Baron Wigoder QC (12 February 1921 to 12 August 2004) was a British barrister and Liberal Party politician. Regarded as one of the leading criminal barristers of his generation, he practised mainly in criminal law and became known for his defence of individual rights. He later sat in the House of Lords as a life peer, where he served as the Liberal Chief Whip from 1977 to 1984.

== Early life and education ==
Wigoder was born in Manchester on 12 February 1921 into a Jewish family that had originally settled in Dublin before establishing branches in Manchester and Leeds. His father was Dr Philip Wigoder, a dentist, and his mother was Ruth Wigoder, a justice of the peace. He was brought up in the Cheetham district of Manchester, from which he later took his title.

He was educated at Manchester Grammar School, where he developed lifelong enthusiasms for cricket and for Manchester United, and in 1939 he won an open scholarship to Oriel College, Oxford, to read modern history. His studies were interrupted by the Second World War, during which he served in the Royal Artillery between 1942 and 1945. He was commissioned as a second lieutenant on 14 August 1942. Serving with the 30th Field Regiment, Royal Artillery, he saw action in Italy, including the Battle of Monte Cassino, the liberation of Rome and the fighting around Florence, and in the British intervention in Greece in 1944 and 1945.

After the war he returned to Oriel College to complete his degree, taking his MA in 1946, and was elected President of the Oxford Union and of the university Liberal Club. He was called to the Bar at Gray's Inn in 1946.

== Legal career ==
=== Early practice ===
After being called to the Bar, Wigoder joined a set of chambers in Dr Johnson's Buildings in the Temple, and his early practice consisted largely of prosecuting in criminal cases. In 1951 he was junior counsel for Clarence Willcock, a motorist who had refused to produce his identity card when stopped by a police officer; in the resulting case, Willcock v Muckle, the Lord Chief Justice, Lord Goddard, criticised the wartime identity card scheme, and the cards were abolished the following year. Among his prosecutions, he obtained in 1956 the conviction of Anthony Reuter, a figure associated with the Teddy Boy subculture, who was sentenced to five years' imprisonment for malicious wounding, and in 1961 the conviction of a man who was fined £50 for kicking a greyhound at a meeting at Wembley. In 1964 he defended three women charged with indecency for wearing topless dresses on Westminster Bridge, arguing without success that the brief, night-time incident did not amount to indecency. He became known as a leading advocate in cases concerning individual rights.

=== Queen's Counsel and notable trials ===
Wigoder was appointed Queen's Counsel on 20 April 1966, and thereafter appeared in many significant trials. One of his earliest cases after taking silk was the successful defence, before Mr Justice Thesiger, of a man accused of murdering another guest at a party in Notting Hill.

In 1970 he acted for the German student leader Rudi Dutschke before the Immigration Appeals Tribunal, after the Labour government sought to deport him. The proceedings were among the first in England in which a tribunal heard evidence in private that was withheld from the appellant and his legal advisers, a practice that Wigoder regarded as a serious affront to justice. Also in 1970 he defended the journalist and later Conservative Member of Parliament Jonathan Aitken, who was prosecuted under the Official Secrets Act for passing a confidential report on the Biafran War to The Sunday Telegraph. Wigoder argued that the press had a legitimate role in holding government to account, and Aitken and his co-defendants were acquitted; the case strengthened Wigoder's long-standing view that the Official Secrets Act was illiberal and unfair.

His other clients included the former Paymaster General George Wigg, who was acquitted on a charge of kerb-crawling; the Earl of Snowdon, in defence of an allegation that he had driven dangerously at a press photographer who had been harassing him; the painter Francis Bacon, on a charge of possessing cannabis; and Alfred Berman, a defendant in the 1966 trial of the Richardson Gang, who, unlike most of his co-defendants, was acquitted. In 1976 he defended Sheila Buckley, the secretary and mistress, and later wife, of the Labour politician and former Postmaster General John Stonehouse, who had faked his own death in 1974; although she was convicted of theft and conspiracy, Wigoder's plea in mitigation persuaded the court to impose a suspended sentence. In a further case in 1966 he defended a Nigerian student named Orishagbemi who was charged with the murder of his tenant; the defence argued that the deceased had been a witch who had cursed the accused and his wife and that he had acted to ward off the curse, but the argument failed and Orishagbemi was convicted.

He also appeared in several trials connected with the Irish Republican Army, including the Aldershot Garrison bombing trial of 1972 and, from 1973, the case of one of the Guildford Four, who were convicted in 1975 of pub bombings in Guildford and whose convictions were quashed in 1989.

In 1967 he was appointed a Board of Trade inspector to investigate the affairs of the finance company Pinnock Finance (GB) Ltd.

=== Professional and law reform roles ===
Wigoder held a series of offices in the legal profession. He sat on the council of the law reform and human rights organisation Justice from 1960, and was a member of the General Council of the Bar from 1970 to 1974 and of the Crown Court Rules Committee from 1971 to 1977. He sat as a Recorder of the Crown Court from 1972 to 1984. At Gray's Inn he was elected a Master of the Bench in 1972 and served as Vice-Treasurer in 1988 and Treasurer in 1989.

In 1972 he co-founded the Criminal Bar Association with Jeremy Hutchinson, and was one of its early chairmen. He also worked with the barrister Lewis Hawser on a committee that recommended transferring responsibility for criminal prosecutions from the police to an independent prosecuting authority, a principle later embodied in the Crown Prosecution Service. He was a member of the Council on Tribunals from 1980 to 1986, of the Home Office Advisory Committee on Service Candidates from 1984, and was a tribunal chairman of the Securities Association from 1988 to 1992.

== Political career ==
=== Liberal Party ===
Wigoder was a lifelong Liberal and stood for the party at several elections without success. He contested Bournemouth at the 1945 general election, finishing second to the Conservative Sir Leonard Lyle but ahead of the Labour candidate. When Lyle was raised to the peerage later that year, Wigoder stood again at the resulting by-election, at which he came third and the seat was won by Brendan Bracken. He subsequently stood at Westbury at the 1959 and 1964 general elections.

He held senior organisational posts within the party. In 1963 he succeeded Desmond Banks as Chairman of the Liberal Party Executive, holding the position until 1965, when he was succeeded by Gruffydd Evans. He then chaired the Liberal Party Organising Committee from 1965 to 1966.

=== House of Lords ===
On 16 May 1974 Wigoder was created a life peer as Baron Wigoder, of Cheetham in the City of Manchester, and sat in the House of Lords until his death. He served as the Liberal Party's Deputy Whip in the House of Lords from 1976 to 1977 and as its Chief Whip there from 1977 to 1984, and from 1983 to 1988 he was the party's spokesman on home affairs and the health service.

A fluent and effective debater, Wigoder was among the Liberal peers who helped to make the House of Lords a significant check on the government during the 1980s. He was prominent in opposing the Conservative government's Protection of Official Information Bill of 1979, and he criticised proposals that he believed would restrict the right to jury trial and would permit the prosecution to appeal against unduly lenient sentences, arguing that such measures would weaken important safeguards for defendants.

By virtue of his role as Chief Whip he was appointed to the Committee for Privileges. He was not replaced on the committee after he ceased to be Chief Whip, and he remained a member until 2000, by which time he had served on it for 26 years. On leaving, he remarked wryly that he was sorry to be departing just as he was beginning to understand how the committee worked.

== Other activities ==
In January 1977 Wigoder was appointed the first chairman of the Health Services Board, a statutory body created under the Labour government to oversee the phasing-out of private "pay beds" from National Health Service hospitals; the board recommended their withdrawal, and it was abolished by the government of Margaret Thatcher in 1980. In 1981 he became Chairman of the private healthcare organisation British United Provident Association (BUPA), which during his chairmanship expanded from an insurer into a provider of care and opened 31 hospitals. He stepped down as chairman in 1992 and became a vice-president. He was also Vice-President of Nuffield Hospitals from 1981 to 1992 and Vice-President of the Statute Law Society from 1984 to 1990, served on the Court of Nene College from 1982 to 1990, and was a trustee of the Oxford Union Society from 1982 to 1992.

== Personal life ==
Wigoder was brought up in Manchester and lived in London for most of his adult life. He married Yoland Levinson in 1948, and they had four children, comprising three sons and a daughter, of whom one son and one daughter were twins. One of his sons is the businessman Charles Wigoder, executive chairman of the telecommunications company Telecom Plus.

He was a member of the National Liberal Club and of the Marylebone Cricket Club, and his recreations were cricket and music. Lord Wigoder died in London on 12 August 2004 at the age of 83.

== Coat of arms ==
Coat of arms of Basil Wigoder

Crest
On a wreath Or and Gules upon a mount Vert a gosling Or supporting by the dexter foot a daffodil Proper mantled Gules doubled Argent.
Escutcheon
Gules a chevron engrailed Ermine between three wigs Or a chief Or.
Supporters
Dexter a seahorse sinister a sea-griffin both Or their piscine parts Azure scaled finned and tailed Or each gorged with a collar Sable pendent therefrom a chain ending in a broken ring Sable.
Motto
Medio Tutissimus Ibis

Party political offices
Preceded by Desmond Banks	Chairman of the Liberal Party Executive; 1963–1965	Succeeded by Gruffydd Evans
