= Lyle baronets =

Baronetcy in the Baronetage of the United Kingdom

There have been three baronetcies created for members of the Lyle family, all in the Baronetage of the United Kingdom. One creation is extant as of 2010.

The Lyle Baronetcy, of Greenock in the County of Renfrew, was created in the Baronetage of the United Kingdom on 26 June 1915 for the shipowner Robert Lyle. He was the younger brother of the first Baronet of the 1929 creation and the uncle of the first Baronet of the 1932 creation (see below). The title became extinct on his death in 1923.

The Lyle Baronetcy, of Glendelvine in the County of Perth, was created in the Baronetage of the United Kingdom on 26 March 1929 for the shipowner Alexander Lyle. He was the elder brother of the first Baronet of the 1915 creation (see above) and the uncle of the first Baronet of the 1932 creation (see below).

The Lyle Baronetcy, of Canford Cliffs in the Borough of Poole in the County of Dorset, was created in the Baronetage of the United Kingdom on 22 June 1932. For more information on this creation, see Baron Lyle of Westbourne. The first Baronet of this creation was the nephew of the first Baronet of the 1915 creation and of the first Baronet of the 1929 creation (see above).

== Lyle baronets, of Greenock (1915) ==
- Sir Robert Park Lyle, 1st Baronet (1859–1923)

== Lyle baronets, of Glendelvine (1929) ==
- Sir Alexander Park Lyle, 1st Baronet (1849–1933)
- Sir Archibald Moir Park Lyle, 2nd Baronet (1884–1946)
- Sir Gavin Archibald Lyle, 3rd Baronet (born 1941)

The heir apparent is the present holder's son Ian Abram Lyle (born 1968).

== Lyle baronets, of Canford Cliffs (1932) ==
- see Baron Lyle of Westbourne
