= Baron Croft =

Title in the Peerage of the United Kingdom

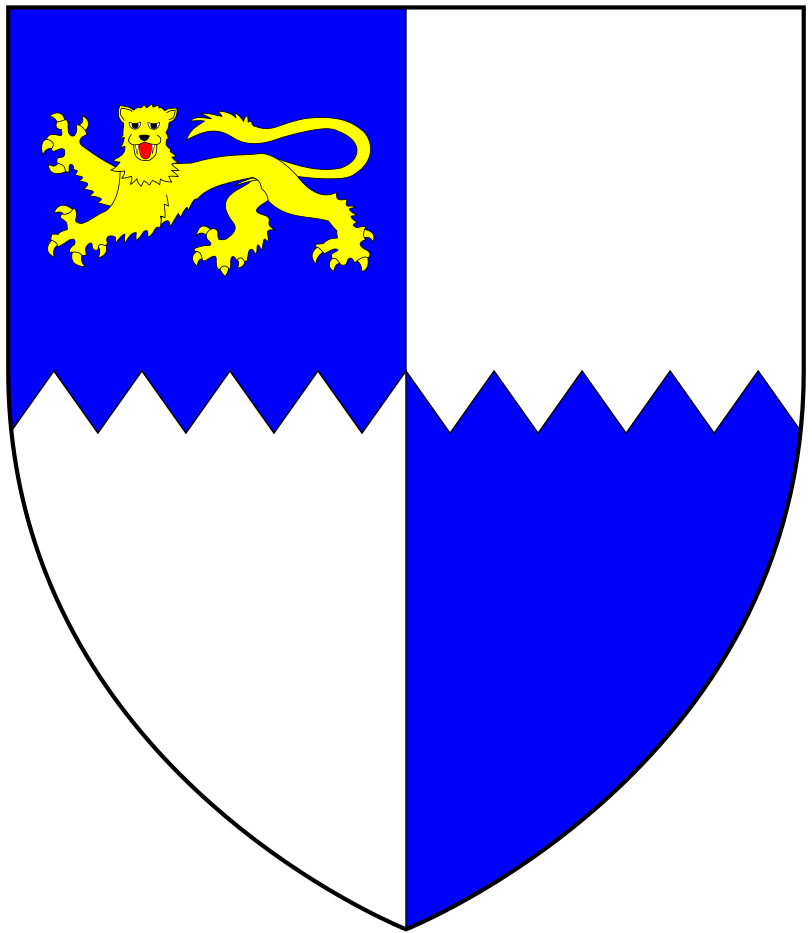
Arms of Croft, of Croft Castle, Herefordshire: Quarterly per fess indented azure and argent, in the 1st quarter a lion passant guardant or

Baron Croft, of Bournemouth in the County of Southampton, is a title in the Peerage of the United Kingdom. It was created on 28 May 1940 for the Conservative politician Sir Henry Page Croft, 1st Baronet. He had already been created a baronet of Knole in the Borough of Bournemouth in the County of Southampton in the Baronetage of the United Kingdom on 28 February 1924. Croft was the grandson of Reverend Richard Croft, third son of Sir Richard Croft, 6th Baronet, of Croft Castle. As of 2010 the titles are held by the first Baron's grandson, the third Baron, who succeeded his father in 1997.

== Barons Croft (1940) ==
- Henry Page Croft, 1st Baron Croft (1881–1947)
- Michael Henry Glendower Page Croft, 2nd Baron Croft (1916–1997)
- Bernard William Henry Page Croft, 3rd Baron Croft (born 1949)

There is no heir to the titles.

== See also ==
- Croft baronets of Croft Castle
