= Henry Nicholls (politician) =

British politician

Henry Nicholls MP

Member of Parliament for Stratford West Ham
- In office 5 July 1945 – 3 February 1950
- Preceded by: Tom Groves
- Succeeded by: Constituency abolished

Personal details
- Born: Henry Richard Nicholls; 20 January 1893
- Died: 5 December 1962 (aged 69)
- Party: Labour

Henry Richard Nicholls (20 January 1893 – 5 December 1962) was a British Labour Party politician. He worked in the London and North Eastern Railway painting coaches before his election.

He was elected at the 1945 general election as Member of Parliament for Stratford division of West Ham, and held the seat until the constituency was abolished at the 1950 general election.

Parliament of the United Kingdom
Preceded by Thomas Groves	Member of Parliament for Stratford; 1945 – 1950	Constituency abolished
