= 1940 Bournemouth by-election =

UK Parliamentary by-election

The 1940 Bournemouth by-election was held on 27 June 1940. The by-election was held due to the elevation to the peerage of the incumbent Conservative MP, Henry Page Croft. It was won by the Conservative candidate Leonard Lyle, who was uncontested.

== Result ==
1940 Bournemouth by-election
| Party | Candidate | Votes | % | ±% |
|---|---|---|---|---|
| Conservative | Leonard Lyle | Unopposed | N/A | N/A |
| Conservative hold | | | | |
