= Henry Page Croft, 1st Baron Croft =

British politician (1881–1947)

Brigadier-General The Right Honourable The Lord Croft CMG TD PC JP
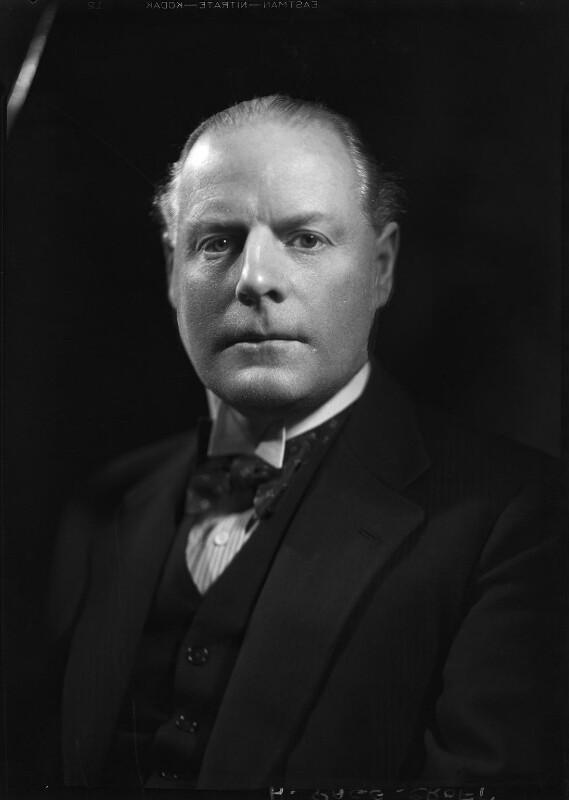

Under-Secretary of State for War
- In office 1940–1945
- Monarch: George VI
- Prime Minister: Winston Churchill
- Preceded by: The Lord Cobham
- Succeeded by: The Lord Nathan

Member of Parliament for Bournemouth Christchurch (1910–1918)
- In office 15 January 1910 – 28 May 1940
- Preceded by: Arthur Acland Allen
- Succeeded by: Leonard Lyle

Personal details
- Born: 22 June 1881 Fanhams Hall, Ware, Hertfordshire
- Died: 7 December 1947 (age 66) London, England
- Party: Conservative; National (1917)
- Education: Eton College; Shrewsbury School; Trinity Hall, Cambridge
- Profession: Politician, soldier
- Awards: CMG; 1914 Star; British War Medal; Victory Medal; Territorial Decoration

Military service
- Allegiance: United Kingdom
- Branch/service: British Army
- Years of service: 1900–1924
- Rank: Brigadier-General
- Unit: Hertfordshire Regiment
- Commands: 68th Brigade
- Battles/wars: First World War; Western Front

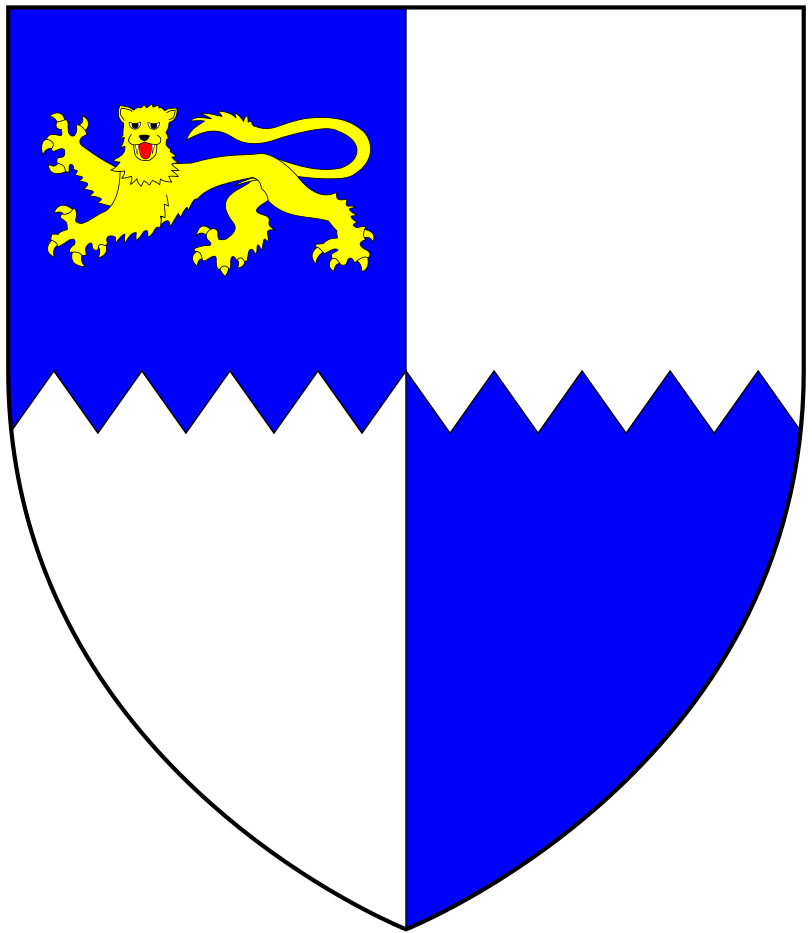
Arms of Croft, of Croft Castle, Herefordshire: Quarterly per fess indented azure and argent, in the 1st quarter a lion passant guardant or

Brigadier-General Henry Page Croft, 1st Baron Croft, CMG, TD, PC, JP (22 June 1881 – 7 December 1947) was a British Army officer and Conservative Party politician.

== Early life and family ==
He was born at Fanhams Hall in Ware, Hertfordshire, England. He was the son of Richard Benyon Croft (1843 – 1912) a naval officer and a major benefactor of the Richard Hale School, and Anne Elizabeth (1843 – 1921). His father held the office of High Sheriff of Hertfordshire in 1892, beside those of Deputy Lieutenant (D.L.) of Hertfordshire and of Justice of the Peace (J.P.) for that county.

He was the grandson of the Reverend Richard Croft, rector at Hillingdon, Middlesex, England, and Charlotte Leonora Russell. He was the great-grandson of Sir Richard Croft, 6th Baronet and Margaret Denman, daughter of Dr. Thomas Denman and Elizabeth Brodie and the sister of Thomas Denman, 1st Baron Denman who became Lord Chief Justice of England and Wales.

His mother was the daughter of Henry Page of Ware, Hertfordshire, England. He was an astute businessman and had built up a very prosperous grain trade and a maltster business. Henry Page left his considerable fortune including Fanhams Hall, a large country house and estate located in Ware, to his daughter Anne and her husband, Richard.

== Education ==
After attending St David's prep school in Reigate he was educated first at Eton, until the death of his housemaster, then at Shrewsbury and finally at Trinity Hall, Cambridge, where he was a Volunteer and an oarsman. Upon leaving Cambridge, Croft joined the family business.

== Member of Parliament ==
He became an active participant of the 'Confederacy' of young gentry Chamberlainites who organised a Protectionist movement in Hertfordshire. In the general election of 1906 Croft stood at Lincoln against a Conservative Free Trader but failed to win the seat. In January 1910 however he was elected as the Member of Parliament (MP) for Christchurch as an anti-German Protectionist. His contribution to the tariff reform campaign before the Great War has been described as "immense". In protest against what he perceived as the reactionary policy of Conservative leader Arthur Balfour, Croft founded the Reveille, a group that campaigned for imperialism and social reform.

In the House of Commons he was a prominent advocate of food taxation, Imperial Preference and as a supporter of Ulster against Home Rule. Croft was with Viscount Castlereagh at Mount Stewart when Ulster prepared for war in 1914. When the First World War broke out he went to France with his territorial battalion of the Hertfordshire Regiment. In 1915 he was the first territorial to command a brigade in the field but his reports to politicians back home about the conduct of his commanders aroused controversy and so in 1916 he was recalled, where he returned to the Commons.

In co-operation with Sir Richard Cooper, because of what they perceived as the "discrediting of the old party system", they founded the National Party in September 1917. They were also angered at the bestowal of honours on those they believed did not deserve them and that hundreds of enemy aliens should be at liberty in Britain when they were possibly endangering British soldiers' lives by passing information to the enemy. The National Party aimed for: "Complete victory in the war and after the war"; robust diplomacy along with increased armaments; the "eradication of German influence"; ending the sale of honours; maximum production along with fair wages and fair profit; safeguarding of industry and agriculture; Empire unity through mutual and reciprocal aid in development of the natural resources of the Empire; a social policy that will ensure a "patriotic race"; and demobilization and reconstruction.

At the 1918 election Croft was elected as the National candidate for Bournemouth, a seat he would hold until 1940. In his autobiography Croft claimed that

We emerged from the world war in 1918 stronger than at any time in our history. On the sea our fleet was supreme and unchallengeable; we had a mighty army such as we had never possessed before; in the air our power had reached its zenith and was probably the largest, best manned and most finely equipped fighting force in that sphere. ... Great Britain ... proceeded to go "international" and our great country, which had been saved by the valour and patriotism of our people, was deliberately encouraged to rely for its safety upon a hotch-potch collection of small states embodied in what was never a world League of Nations but a League of some nations based not on defensive force but on pious resolutions which were endorsed by ceaseless chatter at many conferences.

In February 1919 Croft denounced H. H. Asquith, Reginald McKenna, Walter Runciman, Arthur Henderson and Ramsay MacDonald as "the worse type of pacifist cranks": "It is very delightful to have been able to mention their names in this House. These men...were not defeated at the polls but squelched. Why did they rally to the proposal? [i.e. the placing of conquered German colonies under League of Nations mandate]. Because they saw it was unnational". When Coalition Liberal MP Alexander Lyle-Samuel made a speech criticising reparations from Germany and supported the League of Nations, Croft claimed that although Lyle-Samuel sat for a Suffolk constituency, he might well sit for Wurtemburg or Bavaria in Germany. The Gladstonian liberal, R. B. McCallum, said Croft "was the authentic voice of triumphant, nationalist Toryism ... [he] represented the crude, philistine spirit of John Bullish nationalism. He was speaking for millions".

Along with Cooper, Croft was prominent in the campaign against the Prime Minister David Lloyd George in July 1922 for selling honours. In 1924, he was appointed a baronet in Stanley Baldwin's resignation honours.

Croft wrote articles for the National Review and doubted the effectiveness of the League of Nations. Croft was strongly opposed to the National Government's Government of India Act 1935, which granted further self-government to the British Raj, and joined Winston Churchill and the India Defence League in opposing the Act. Croft was also associated with Churchill in urging greater rearmament in face of the German threat. In June 1938 Croft wrote a series of articles for the Weekly Review, arguing for British re-armament. He also recognized that Nazi Germany would try to start a war after reading Mein Kampf. However, unlike Churchill, Croft supported the Munich Agreement, believing that the incorporation of the Sudetenland into Germany was inevitable and that Britain could not prevent it militarily due to insufficient British rearmament.

In 1936, Croft's independently minded daughter Diana married the German lawyer and painter Fred Uhlman, a clear misalliance in the eyes of Croft.

During the Spanish Civil War, Croft was a strong supporter of General Franco and the Nationalists, serving on the Friends of National Spain committee.

== Under-Secretary of State for War ==
In 1940 Croft was ennobled, and appointed by Winston Churchill as Under-Secretary of State for War, a post he would hold until July 1945. Croft in his memoirs said of The Blitz: "Every class of Londoner responded defiantly to the long, long period of attack and from the Royal Family to the Coster or Dustman all vied in showing their contempt of danger and sustained each other through bomb raids, "doodles" and rockets to the end ... London is a grand city with a big heart".

Croft recognised the need to improve morale in the Army and wrote on 12 August 1940 of the need for education and entertainment to be provided to servicemen on a big scale: travelling cinemas, technical classes, correspondence courses, and morale-boosting stories of the Empire and regimental traditions. A Director of Education was appointed and by the winter of 1943–44 there were more than 110,000 courses, lectures and classes being provided.

On 4 February 1942 Croft said in the Lords:

There seems to be a feeling abroad that the rifle is essential as a weapon for all the Home Guard, and I should like to remind your Lordships that in the event of invasion in a great part of this country we shall be engaged in fighting of a close character. For instance, in the actual cities, towns and villages the opportunities for using hand grenades against enemy motor cyclists and infantry, and incendiary and high explosive grenades against vehicles of all descriptions will be immense. If every platoon had its trained sections of grenade throwers or bombers there is no doubt that operating from trenches or from windows or doorways, or suddenly emerging round houses and cottages, they would he able to inflict great casualties upon an advancing enemy. If I were organizing an attack—I am afraid this sounds rather absurd from one so aged as myself, but my noble friend Lord Mottistone, who I always feel is so much younger than many of us, would probably bear me out in this—I would rather have trained bombers for fighting in urban areas, and if a bombing attack could be swiftly followed up by cold steel, it would be most effective. If I were a bomber in such a formation—and I think I have thrown most types of bombs that have been used in the Army—I should like to have a pike in order to follow up my bombing attack, especially at night. It is a most effective and silent weapon.

The reporting of this in the press attracted ridicule and accusations that Croft was issuing pikes to the Home Guard and that he was "pike-minded". The Liberal National MP Sir Henry Fildes said in the Commons on 11 March:

Here lies a man who fought the Hun;
He had a pike, the Hun a gun;
When his time came to go aloft,
Whom must he blame? The Hun or Croft?

To which Leo Amery wrote in reply:

Why blame poor Croft who through long years
Preached lack of guns to unwilling ears?
Blame rather in this hour of need
The foolish ears that would not heed.

In a speech at Watford during the 1945 general election campaign Croft called the Labour Party Chairman Harold Laski, who was Jewish, "that fine old English labour man". Churchill wrote to Croft on 20 June: "I see you used an expression in your speech the other day about Laski that he was "a fine representative of the old British working class", or words to that effect. Pray be careful, whatever the temptation, not to be drawn into any campaign that might be represented as anti-semitism".

== Last years ==
Croft died in 1947 at the Middlesex Hospital, London.

== Legacy ==
The Times said of Croft after he died:

By his unflagging zeal and faith in the British imperial heritage, he won for himself a distinctive place in political life. Staunch Conservative as he was, he placed service to the imperial ideal at least as high as party loyalty. This enthusiasm and a personality that was attractive as well as forcible made their influence felt in the House of Commons and on the platform. At every opportunity he advocated greater settlement by the British race in the Dominions and the strengthening of the bonds of Empire by every possible means, and he was a recognized if unofficial leader in Parliament of a group sharing his convictions and aspirations. One article in Croft's political creed which he proclaimed long before voluntary National Service was instituted in 1938–39 was that citizens should require the State for guaranteeing the rights of private ownership by engaging in some form of public activity. ... He was popular at the War Office and still much in request on the public platform, from which he could always put over a point effectively, though party politics suited his style and temperament better than the advocacy of the policy of a coalition. But he continued to sound the patriotic note convincingly, all the more so because he was a completely sincere patriot.

== Writings ==
- H. P. Croft, 'A citizen army', in Lord Malmesbury (ed.), The New Order: Studies in Unionist Policy (Francis Griffiths, 1908), pp. 255–268.
- H. P. Croft, The Path of Empire (John Murray, 1912).
- H. P. Croft, Twenty-Two Months Under Fire (John Murray, 1916).
- H. P. Croft, The Crisis: How to Restore Prosperity (1931).
- H. P. Croft, The Salvation of India (1933).
- Sir Henry Page Croft, 1st Baron Croft, My Life of Strife (Hutchinson, 1948).

== Notes ==
Parliament of the United Kingdom
Preceded by Arthur Acland Allen	Member of Parliament for Christchurch; January 1910 – 1918	Constituency abolished
New constituency	Member of Parliament for Bournemouth; 1918–1940	Succeeded by Sir Leonard Lyle, Bt.
Peerage of the United Kingdom
New creation	Baron Croft; 1940–1947	Succeeded by Michael Croft
Baronetage of the United Kingdom
New creation	Baronet (of Knole); 1924–1947	Succeeded by Michael Croft
