= Democratic Party (UK, 1942) =

- Leader: Norman Leith-Hay-Clark
- Founder: Norman Leith-Hay-Clark
- Founded: 1942
- Dissolved: 1961
- Split from: Conservative Party
- Ideology: Pro-free enterprise Antisemitism

The Democratic Party was formed in 1942, during the Second World War by Major Norman Leith-Hay-Clark. It was supportive of free enterprise but also called for limits on excessive individual incomes.

It managed to recruit various converts from the Conservative Party and stood in the 1945 general election but without any success. Led by Major N. Leith-Hay-Clarke, the party was also noted for its antisemitic stance. Shortly after, it was renamed the Independent Democratic Party and was active in investigating what it described as "cases of personal hardship" until at least 1961, although it had long ceased direct political activity.

== Election results ==
Constituency	Candidate	Votes	%	Position
Chichester	Paul Tracy Carter	118	0.2	5
Maidstone	G Murray	416	1.0	3
Portsmouth Central	Walter R C Foster	561	2.1	3
Portsmouth North	John Edward Vincent Keast	388	1.3	3
Westminster Abbey	Norman Leith-Hay-Clark	326	1.9	4
