= Fanhams Hall =

Hotel in Ware, Hertfordshire, England

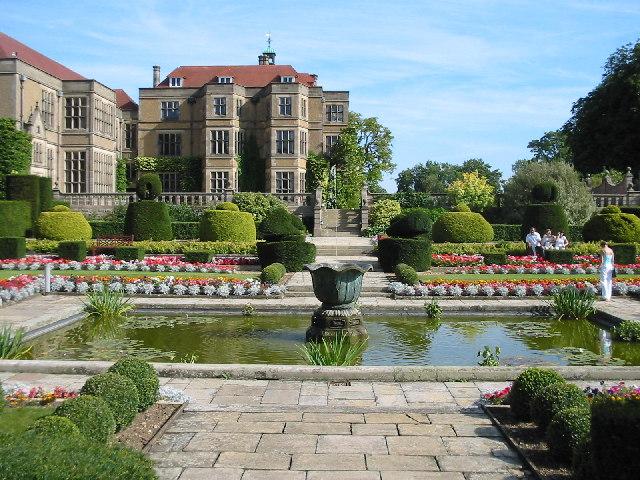

- Location within Hertfordshire

General information
- Location: Fanhams Hall Road, Wareside, Hertfordshire
- Coordinates: 51°49′21″N 0°0′41″W
- Owner: Exclusive Hotels and Venues

Fanhams Hall is an 18th-century Queen Anne style country house in Wareside, Hertfordshire, in the south east of England. It is a Grade II* listed building which is now operating as a hotel.

== History ==
Built in the early 18th century, the house was subsequently enlarged in 1901, when the original brick building was encased and extended as a three-storey Jacobean style country house, roughcast with stone dressings. The interior was decorated in the Arts and Crafts style with plasterwork by L A Turner and stained glass by Morris and Co. in the library.

Fanhams Hall is noteworthy for being the birthplace and home of the first Lord Croft, Sir Henry Page-Croft, who was the youngest son of Richard Benyon Croft (benefactor of Richard Hale School) and who was Winston Churchill's appointed Under-Secretary of State for War until 1945. The south-east wing of the house served as his living quarters, and the present-day bedrooms numbered 207-210 were Lord Croft's maisonette. In 1874, Fanhams Hall was also the birthplace and home of his sister, Anne, who later became the second wife of Liverpool Brewer Sir Charles Nall-Cain; they lived at Brocket Hall, Welwyn until Lord Brocket's death in 1934, when Lady Brocket returned to Fanhams Hall where she resided until her death in 1949.

The house was sold as a training centre to the Westminster Bank in 1951, to the Chartered Building Society Institute in 1971, and to J Sainsbury plc in February 1986.

J Sainsbury undertook a comprehensive scheme of extension and restoration at the site, to designs of the architect Nicholas Ray, including further bedrooms and a restaurant and meeting room pavilion wing, completed in Spring 1993.

== Garden ==
Lady Brocket's interest in horticulture influenced the employment of Japanese gardeners to create the Hall's formal gardens. Her ornamental lakes and choice of trees (such as Japanese maples) can still be seen in the present-day formal grounds, as can the "Fuji-yama Mound (Fujizuka)" which was built with earth from the Hall's lakes. The gardens at Fanhams Hall are cited as one of the most famous examples of a Japanese Garden in England and includes separately Grade II listed terracing and steps, stone Japanese lanterns, two bridges and three follies (two Japanese and one Austrian).

J Sainsbury undertook a restoration of the gardens, under the direction of landscape architects; Higson Pearson, with the resulting scheme being awarded the President's Award for Design in 1993 by the Landscape Institute.

The garden is listed grade II on the Register of Historic Parks and Gardens.

== Current use ==
The Hall currently serves as a hotel and events venue, and is owned by the hotel group Exclusive Hotels and Venues. The Hall is still open to the public as a local meeting point. For example, the local branch of the Ancient Order of Foresters holds meetings within the grounds.
