= Multi-utility =

Multi-utility relates to companies offering a wide range of services and/or products. In the business market, this type of service provision usually relates to energy, environmental services, waste issues, infrastructure and/or telecom services. In the consumer market, it often concerns a combined offering of services in the field of energy and digital products and services (telephony, internet and television). Providers like these are also referred to as multi-service providers. So it often concerns services and products in relation to public utilities. Multi-utility has a relation with cross-selling, offering complementary products and services.

== Canada ==
An example of a multi-utility company in Canada is ATCO. ATCO provides engineering services, modular infrastructure, and natural gas products. Because of their diversification, Atco is able to tie together several related services which enables the company to offer excellent product consistency.

== Netherlands ==
In the Netherlands, multi-utility became very popular amongst power companies in the 1890s. As a consequence of the liberalization of the energy market, these companies were looking for opportunities to widen their product range. In addition to energy, they started to offer products and services through cable (internet, television) as well; in the business market they also became active in the fields of environment and waste. They considered these markets as logical complements to the traditional energy supply. These markets had a strong association with public utilities, which led to the name multi-utility.

== Cogeneration ==
In the business markets, partnerships were often created as well with (large) customers, particularly in relation to cogeneration, the combined generation of heat (steam) and electricity (power). In the seventies, cogeneration expanded enormously. Large industries in particular invested in cogeneration, but smaller applications saw benefits as well. You could think of horticulture, swimming pools or hospitals. Cogeneration installations were placed at many companies, sometimes paid by the client, sometimes via a joint venture, but also often paid for by the power company. Management and maintenance of these installations are performed by the power company. Power that is not consumed by the client, is supplied to the electricity grid. The excess steam is also used for other applications.

== Outsourcing ==
The management of these cogeneration installations also fitted the trend of outsourcing. In case of outsourcing, the activities and/or business units that are not considered the core business, or are considered as complementary activities, are contracted out. This phenomenon particularly occurred at ICT departments of companies, but also administrative tasks, the contact with customers (through a call center) and facility services were often outsourced. They would preferably choose a party for whom these activities concerned were part of their core activities.

== Current situation ==
By now, most of the Dutch power companies have abandoned this multi-utility strategy. They have chosen to focus on energy: mono-utility. By doing so, they are returning to their roots as it were. An exception to this is DELTA, from the Dutch province of Zeeland. Due to the increase in scale that has taken place in the energy sector, DELTA has explicitly chosen to further deepen their relationship with their customers through a combined service provision.

This service provision has various manifestation in the business market:

1 Multiple products	Customer takes several products or services
2 Framework agreement	Customer enters into a contract of several years, and buys a number of products and/or services
3 Construction and management concept	Investment in and management of assets at the customer, combined with the purchase of several products and services
4 Outsourcing	Taking over the utility related assets (possibly incl. the personnel involved in that)
5 Full service	Taking over existing assets, infrastructure and personnel on the business site of the customer, combined with the supply of products and services

== Outside of the Netherlands ==
Outside of the Netherlands, there are various other multi-utility companies. The best known examples are Stadtwerke in Germany and Austria. In order to stand their ground against large power companies (Eon, RWE), these companies have developed themselves to become versatile enterprises. In addition to energy and water, these companies are also involved with the exploitation of traffic light installations, public swimming pools. Shareholders are municipalities. In Norway, Hafslund and Lyse Energi refer to themselves as multi-utility companies.

Another example is GDF Suez, an international industrial and service group. This company was created in 2007 and originated from France. It is active in the field of energy, energy related services and environment. In 2008 it had a turnover of more than 80 billion Euros. In the Netherlands, the company is active in energy (under the name of Electrabel), waste (SITA) and industrial service provision (Cofely, called GTI until 2009).
