= Bournemouth (constituency) =

Former parliamentary constituency in the United Kingdom

Coordinates: 50.722°N 1.879°W

- Former borough constituency for the House of Commons

1918–1950
- Created from: Christchurch
- Replaced by: Bournemouth East and Christchurch and Bournemouth West

Bournemouth was a former United Kingdom Parliamentary constituency. The seat was created in 1918 and existed until it was abolished and split into two new seats in 1950. During the constituency's existence it was the most south-westerly seat in Hampshire (although the county boundary between Dorset and Hampshire was redrawn in 1974 so the town was transferred to Dorset).

== Boundaries ==
Before 1918 the County Borough of Bournemouth formed part of the then parliamentary borough of Christchurch. Under the Representation of the People Act 1918 Bournemouth gained its own constituency, with the same boundaries as the then county borough.

The seat was bordered to the west by the constituency of Dorset East, while to the north was New Forest and Christchurch. The rest of the constituency bordered the English Channel.

In the 1950 redistribution, the Representation of the People Act 1948 provided for the division of Bournemouth (with the addition of the neighbouring town of Christchurch) into Bournemouth East and Christchurch & Bournemouth West.

== Members of Parliament ==
Election	Member	Party	Notes
1918	Henry Croft	National	
1921	Henry Croft	Conservative	Resigned May 1940 on being raised to the peerage
1940 by-election	Leonard Lyle	Conservative	Resigned October 1945 on being raised to the peerage
1945 by-election	Brendan Bracken	Conservative	
1950	constituency abolished: see Bournemouth East and Christchurch & Bournemouth West		

== Elections ==
=== Elections in the 1910s ===
General election 1918: Bournemouth
Party	Candidate	Votes	%	±%
National	Henry Page Croft	14,048	66.3	
Labour	Frederick Jesse Hopkins	5,302	25.0	
Liberal	Thomas Dove Keighley	1,854	8.7	
Majority		8,746	41.3	
Turnout		21,204	64.1	
National win (new seat)				

=== Elections in the 1920s ===
C.B. Dallow

General election 1922: Bournemouth
Party	Candidate	Votes	%	±%
Unionist	Henry Page Croft	15,690	52.3	−14.0
Liberal	Cyril Berkeley Dallow	10,181	33.9	+25.2
Lloyd George Conservative	Harry Keen Hargreaves	4,134	13.8	New
Majority		5,509	18.4	N/A
Turnout		30,005	79.8	+15.7
Registered electors		37,598		
Unionist gain from National		Swing	N/A	

General election 1923: Bournemouth
Party	Candidate	Votes	%	±%
Unionist	Henry Page Croft	15,506	50.4	−1.9
Liberal	Cyril Berkeley Dallow	9,256	30.1	−3.8
Labour	Minnie Pallister	5,986	19.5	New
Majority		6,250	20.3	+1.9
Turnout		30,748	79.0	−0.8
Registered electors		38,913		
Unionist hold		Swing	+1.0	

General election 1924: Bournemouth
Party	Candidate	Votes	%	±%
Unionist	Henry Page Croft	20,620	72.7	+22.3
Labour	Minnie Pallister	7,735	27.3	+7.8
Majority		12,885	45.4	+25.1
Turnout		28,355	69.1	−9.9
Registered electors		41,038		
Unionist hold		Swing	+7.25	

General election 1929: Bournemouth
Party	Candidate	Votes	%	±%
Unionist	Henry Page Croft	25,945	52.2	−20.5
Liberal	Arthur Mortimer	15,890	31.9	New
Labour	Maurice Spencer	7,900	15.9	−11.4
Majority		10,055	20.3	−25.1
Turnout		49,735	74.4	+5.3
Registered electors		66,812		
Unionist hold		Swing	−26.2	

=== Elections in the 1930s ===
General election 1931: Bournemouth
Party	Candidate	Votes	%	±%
Conservative	Henry Page Croft	39,859	80.03	
Labour	JH Collingbourne	9,943	19.97	
Majority		29,916	60.06	
Turnout		49,802	70.28	
Conservative hold		Swing		

General election 1935: Bournemouth
Party	Candidate	Votes	%	±%
Conservative	Henry Page Croft	32,645	71.08	
Labour	Maurice Solomon Davidson	13,279	28.92	
Majority		19,366	42.16	
Turnout		45,924	62.62	
Conservative hold		Swing		

=== Elections in the 1940s ===
1940 Bournemouth by-election
Party	Candidate	Votes	%	±%
Conservative	Leonard Lyle	Unopposed	N/A	N/A
Conservative hold				

General election 1945: Bournemouth
Party	Candidate	Votes	%	±%
Conservative	Leonard Lyle	34,544	55.45	
Liberal	Basil Wigoder	14,232	22.85	N/A
Labour	Robert Spence Watson Pollard	13,522	21.71	
Majority		20,312	32.60	
Turnout		62,298	71.32	
Conservative hold		Swing		

1945 Bournemouth by-election
Party	Candidate	Votes	%	±%
Conservative	Brendan Bracken	22,980	46.85	−8.60
Labour	Edward Shackleton	16,526	33.69	+11.98
Liberal	Basil Wigoder	9,548	19.46	−3.39
Majority		6,454	13.16	−19.44
Turnout		49,054	56.5	−14.8
Conservative hold		Swing	-10.3	

== See also ==
- List of former United Kingdom Parliament constituencies
