= Leonard Lyle, 1st Baron Lyle of Westbourne =

British tennis player (1882–1954)

The Baron Lyle of Westbourne

Member of Parliament
- In office 27 June 1940 – October 1945
- Preceded by: Henry Page Croft
- Succeeded by: Brendan Bracken
- Constituency: Bournemouth
- In office 6 December 1923 – 9 October 1924
- Preceded by: Richard Colvin
- Succeeded by: Winston Churchill
- Constituency: Epping
- In office 14 December 1918 – 26 October 1922
- Preceded by: Constituency established
- Succeeded by: Tom Groves
- Constituency: Stratford West Ham

Personal details
- Born: Charles Ernest Leonard Lyle; 22 July 1882 London, England
- Died: 6 March 1954 (aged 71)
- Party: Conservative
- Education: Trinity Hall, Cambridge

Charles Ernest Leonard Lyle, 1st Baron Lyle of Westbourne (22 July 1882 – 6 March 1954) was a British industrialist and Conservative Party politician.

== Early life ==
He was born in London, the only son of Charles Lyle and his wife, Mary, née Brown. He was educated at Harrow School and at Trinity Hall, Cambridge.

== Business ==
The family were major ship-owners who had diversified into sugar refining, and Leonard joined the firm in 1903, and became a director when his father retired in 1909. When Abram Lyle & Sons merged with Henry Tate & Sons in 1921 to form Tate & Lyle he became a director of the new company, then chairman in 1928, and president in 1937.

Lyle is best known for leading the opposition to the post-war Labour Government's plans to nationalise the sugar industry. The campaign was fronted by a cartoon character, "Mr Cube", drawn by artist Bobby St John Cooper.

== Sport ==
Lyle was a notable athlete who represented Great Britain at lawn tennis, competing the Men's singles at the Wimbledon Championships in 1922, 1923, and 1924. He became chairman of the Lawn Tennis Association in 1932, having been the first chairman of the International Lawn Tennis Club from 1924 to 1927. He was also president of the Professional Golfers' Association from 1952 to 1954, and was elected a member of the Royal Yacht Squadron in 1952.

== Politics ==
He was elected as Member of Parliament (MP) for the Stratford division of West Ham at the 1918 general election, but was defeated at the 1922 general election. He was returned to the House of Commons in 1923 general election for Epping, but stood down at the 1924 general election to make way for Winston Churchill. He did not stand again until 1940, when he was elected as MP for Bournemouth at an unopposed by-election, and held the seat until he was ennobled in October 1945 in Churchill's resignation honours list, having stood aside to make way for Brendan Bracken.

He was knighted in the 1923 Birthday Honours, made a baronet on 22 June 1932, and was ennobled on 13 September 1945 as Baron Lyle of Westbourne, of Canford Cliffs in the County of Dorset.

== Arms ==
Coat of arms of Leonard Lyle, 1st Baron Lyle of Westbourne

Crest
Upon a mascle fesswise Or interlaced with two sugar canes in saltire a cock Proper.
Escutcheon
Or a fess Gules fretty of the field between in chief two lions rampant Azure and in base a lymphad Sable flags flying Gules the sail charged with a thistle slipped and leaved also of the field.
Supporters
On the dexter side a lion Azure charged on the shoulder with a rose Or and on the sinister side a snowgoose wings endorsed Proper.
Motto
An I May

Parliament of the United Kingdom
| New constituency | Member of Parliament for West Ham, Stratford; 1918–1922 | Succeeded by Thomas Groves |
| Preceded by Richard Colvin | Member of Parliament for Epping; 1923–1924 | Succeeded by Winston Churchill |
| Preceded by Sir Henry Page Croft | Member of Parliament for Bournemouth; 1940–1945 | Succeeded by Brendan Bracken |
Baronetage of the United Kingdom
| New creation | Baronet (of Westbourne); 1932–1954 | Succeeded by Charles John Leonard Lyle |
Peerage of the United Kingdom
| New creation | Baron Lyle of Westbourne; 1945–1954 | Succeeded by Charles John Leonard Lyle |
