= Stratford West Ham =

Parliamentary constituency in the United Kingdom, 1918–1950

Stratford
- Former borough constituency for the House of Commons
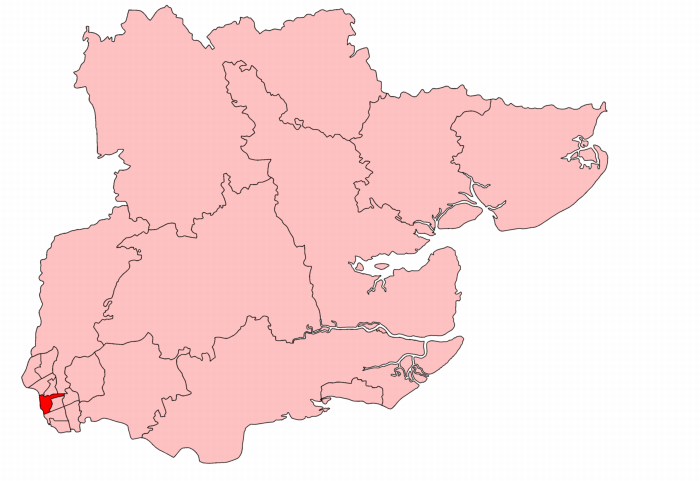
- Stratford in Essex, showing boundaries used from 1918 to 1950.
- County: Essex

1918–1950
- Seats: One
- Created from: West Ham North
- Replaced by: West Ham North

Stratford (strictly the Stratford Division of West Ham) was a parliamentary constituency in the Borough of West Ham in the South-West of Essex (now East London), which returned one Member of Parliament (MP) to the House of Commons of the Parliament of the United Kingdom, elected by the first-past-the-post voting system.

The constituency was created for the 1918 general election and abolished for the 1950 general election.

== Members of Parliament ==
Election	Member	Party
1918	Leonard Lyle	Coalition Conservative
1922	Thomas Groves	Labour
1945	Henry Nicholls	Labour
1950	constituency abolished	

== Elections ==
=== Election in the 1940s ===
General election 1945: Stratford
Party	Candidate	Votes	%	±%
Labour	Henry Nicholls	11,484	74.6	+11.5
Conservative	Redvers Michael Prior	3,162	20.5	−16.4
Independent	Thomas Groves	749	4.9	New
Majority		8,322	54.1	+27.9
Turnout		15,395	60.9	+3.8
Registered electors		25,295		
Labour hold		Swing	+14.0	

=== Elections in the 1930s ===
General election 1935: Stratford
Party	Candidate	Votes	%	±%
Labour	Thomas Groves	14,427	63.1	+12.7
Conservative	F.H.G.H. Goodhart	8,452	36.9	−12.7
Majority		5,975	26.2	+25.4
Turnout		22,879	57.1	−7.5
Registered electors		40,042		
Labour hold		Swing	+12.7	

General election 1931: Stratford
Party	Candidate	Votes	%	±%
Labour	Thomas Groves	13,925	50.4	−8.2
Conservative	C.G. Wodehouse-Temple	13,722	49.6	+21.4
Majority		203	0.8	−29.6
Turnout		27,647	64.6	−1.4
Registered electors		42,815		
Labour hold		Swing	−14.8	

=== Elections in the 1920s ===
General election 1929: Stratford
Party	Candidate	Votes	%	±%
Labour	Thomas Groves	16,665	58.6	+2.6
Unionist	Henry Procter	8,018	28.2	−15.8
Liberal	Albert Charles Crane	3,779	13.3	New
Majority		8,647	30.4	+18.4
Turnout		28,462	66.0	−3.0
Registered electors		43,134		
Labour hold		Swing	+9.2	

General election 1924: Stratford
Party	Candidate	Votes	%	±%
Labour	Thomas Groves	13,264	56.0	+0.9
Unionist	Harold Balfour	10,414	44.0	+17.8
Majority		2,850	12.0	−16.9
Turnout		23,678	69.0	+7.2
Registered electors		34,293		
Labour hold		Swing	−8.5	

General election 1923: Stratford
Party	Candidate	Votes	%	±%
Labour	Thomas Groves	11,466	55.1	+8.3
Unionist	Victor Fisher	5,443	26.2	−14.3
Liberal	William Crow	3,888	18.7	+6.0
Majority		6,023	28.9	+22.6
Turnout		20,797	61.8	−3.1
Registered electors		33,664		
Labour hold		Swing	+11.3	

General election 1922: Stratford
Party	Candidate	Votes	%	±%
Labour	Thomas Groves	10,017	46.8	New
Unionist	Leonard Lyle	8,641	40.5	−23.3
Liberal	Alfred Scott	2,704	12.7	−23.5
Majority		1,376	6.3	N/A
Turnout		21,362	64.9	+22.6
Registered electors		32,930		
Labour gain from Unionist		Swing		

=== Elections in the 1910s ===
General election 1918: Stratford
Party		Candidate	Votes	%	±%
C	Unionist	Leonard Lyle	8,498	63.8	
	Liberal	Charles Masterman	4,821	36.2	
Majority			3,677	27.6	
Turnout			13,319	42.3	
Registered electors			31,458		
	Unionist win (new seat)				
C indicates candidate endorsed by the coalition government.
