= Utility Warehouse =

British multi-utility brand of Telecom Plus

- Type: Subsidiary
- Industry: Public utility, multi-level marketing
- Founded: 2002
- Headquarters: Colindale, North London, London, United Kingdom
- Products: Landline telephony; Mobile telephony; Broadband; Gas; Electricity; Home Insurance
- Number of employees: 1400+
- Parent: Telecom Plus plc
- Website: uw.co.uk

Utility Warehouse is a multi-service provider based in London, England that uses multi-level marketing to obtain customers through independent distributors. It is a brand name of its parent company, Telecom Plus. It currently handles approximately 1 million customer accounts. Utility Warehouse supplies customers with landline telephony, mobile telephony, broadband, gas, and electricity. The Utility Warehouse brand is the primary engine of revenue generation for Telecom Plus.

== History ==
Telecom Plus, a FTSE 250 company, established Utility Warehouse in 2002 as a subsidiary and brand to encompass all of their residential energy, telephony and broadband offerings. The Utility Warehouse headquarters is in Colindale, North London.

In 2006, UW and Telecom Plus entered into an agreement with npower, under which npower would supply energy (gas and electricity) to UW customers. UW sold its two subsidiaries (Electricity Plus and Gas Plus) to npower. A 2009 article by The Guardian reported that Telecom Plus's rates were generally average, and as much as 20% higher than the best deals.

In 2013, however, npower sold the two former Telecom Plus subsidiaries back to Utility Warehouse for £218 million. As a result, Utility Warehouse became one of the largest independent energy suppliers in the UK. The deal sparked commentary about the possibility of npower's parent company RWE leaving the UK, or the emergence of a "Big Seven" in place of the existing Big Six energy suppliers. In 2023, UW reported that it was the seventh largest energy supplier in the UK, supplying around 3% of UK households.

In 2021, UW agreed to pay £1.5 million into Ofgem's redress fund, after an investigation begun by Ofgem in 2018 found that since 2013 the company had not given sufficient support to customers in payment difficulties.

In 2023, UW had over 360,000 broadband customers and over 420,000 mobile telephony customers.

== Products ==
The company supply Residential and Business customers. Its telephony and energy services are often bundled to reduce costs for customers.

== Business model ==
Utility Warehouse employs an independent distributor model that utilises self-employed partners to obtain new customers. Distributors introduce both residential and business customers.

Utility Warehouse has no shops and does not advertise on television or in the national press. The company uses word-of-mouth as a primary means of promotion, and offers bonuses to distributors who recruit new customers and distributors.

Distributors gain a commission from their own customers and their distributor's customers, making Telecom Plus a multi-level marketing company. There is a joining cost to become a distributor (reduced if they become, or already are a customer). A 2017 Guardian investigation found that total commission paid to distributors in the previous financial year was £21.1 million, or less than 3% of revenue; if that amount was divided equally among the 41,717 distributors they would each receive £505 per year. Utility Warehouse responded that the calculation was misleading: "there are many who for whatever reason earn considerably less than £500 per year, and there are those who work at their business extremely hard and earn considerably more than this". In 2019, the average distributor earned £12 a week, prior to taking costs into consideration.
