= Dan Frankel =

Dan Frankel may refer to:

- Dan Frankel (British politician) (1900–1988), MP for Mile End, 1935–1945
- Dan Frankel (American politician) (born 1956), member of the Pennsylvania House of Representatives
