= 1916 Mile End by-election =

UK Parliamentary by-election

The 1916 Mile End by-election was held on 25 January 1916. The by-election was held due to the succession of the incumbent Conservative and former Liberal Unionist MP, Hon. Harry Levy-Lawson to the peerage as Baron Burnham, on the death of his father. It was won by the Conservative candidate Warwick Brookes.

Noel Pemberton-Billing, who had resigned from the Royal Naval Air Service to campaign for greater use of air power in World War I, stood as an independent candidate, promising that when the defence of London was in the hands of "practical airmen" the city would be safe from air raids by zeppelins.

Canvassing on behalf of Brookes began immediately. J. D. Gilbert, who had won the Newington West by-election, sent him a letter of support asking Mile End's Liberals to support Brookes, and B. S. Straus, who had been the prospective Liberal candidate in Mile End, offered to sign Brookes's nomination papers.

Campaigning in support of an intensified war effort, Brookes supported the "economic strangulation" of Germany, and backed Military Service Bill which would introduce conscription. He also supported the development of air defences, and advocated an air force given the same pre-dominance then held by the Royal Navy. The writ for the by-election was issued on 17 January, and with the campaign well underway The Times newspaper commented the next day that it would be "unwise to speculate on the result". Many of Mile End's 6,000 electors were unable to vote, since they were away serving in the war. Some 2,000 of the voters were Jewish, and their support was seen as critical; many of them were shopkeepers, and The Times speculated that they might be attracted to Billings' commitment to end the blackout. Billings made his speeches from the cockpit of an aeroplane and both candidates advocated similar policies for strengthening air defences. Nominations closed on 21 January, and the First Lord of the Admiralty, Arthur Balfour, intervened to denounce the "criminality" of an implication by Billings that the air defence of the East End had been neglected because the people there were poor.

Polling took place on 25 January, and Brookes was declared the winner with a majority of 376 votes (10.4%) over Billings.

Mile End by-election, 1916
Party	Candidate	Votes	%	±%
Conservative	Warwick Brookes	1,991	55.2	+5.1
Independent	Noel Pemberton Billing	1,615	44.8	New
Majority		376	10.4	+10.2
Turnout		3,606		
Conservative hold		Swing	N/A	
