= 1916 Newington West by-election =

UK parliamentary by-election

The 1916 Newington West by-election was a parliamentary by-election held in England on 10 January 1916 to elect a new Member of Parliament (MP) for the UK House of Commons constituency of Newington West in South London.

It was the first by-election in London since the start of World War I in August 1914 where more than one candidate was nominated.

== Vacancy ==
The vacancy arose when it was announced in the 1916 New Year Honours that Cecil Norton, the Liberal MP for Newington West since 1892, was to be elevated to the peerage and thus have a seat in the House of Lords. The title was not formally conferred until 28 January, when Norton became Baron Rathcreedan, but the Commons passed the order for the writ on 4 January.

== Candidates ==
Norton had already indicated his intention to stand down from the Commons at the next general election, and the City of London merchant J. D. Gilbert had already been selected as the Liberal prospective parliamentary candidate. Warwick Brookes, who had contested the seat for the Conservatives at the January and December 1910 elections, had also been selected as his party's prospective candidate. In ordinary circumstances this would have led to a by-election contested both by Gilbert and by Brookes, who had been adopted as the prospective Conservative candidate, but the war had brought a different logic. The parties in the coalition government led by H. H. Asquith had agreed an electoral pact for the duration of the war: when a vacancy arose in a seat held by the Conservatives, the Liberals would not contest the resulting by-election, and vice versa.

It soon became clear that some sort of contest was likely. The Unionist Labour Party invited Lambeth Borough Councillor W. A. Perkins to contest the seat on its behalf, and the London Trades Union Protest Committee selected Joe Terrett to stand on a platform of opposition to the recently introduced drink orders introduced on liquor traffic by the Central Control Board. Terrett promptly began his campaign with literature carrying slogans such as "Smash the control board. No more government by secretly-appointed non-representative bodies". At this point Brookes was still considering whether to stand, so Terrett offered to step down if Brookes would agree to stand and oppose the drink orders. Meanwhile, the Executive of the Liberal Association in Portsmouth made a counter-offer: if Brookes stepped aside, it would agree not to contest the Portsmouth by-election which had been triggered by the ennoblement of the Conservative MP Lord Charles Beresford.

Brookes did step aside, in the interests of preserving the truce between the parties. Nominations closed on Friday 7 January, and only two candidates were nominated: Gilbert and Terrett.

== Result ==
James Daniel Gilbert held the seat for the Liberal Party with a significantly increased majority.

By-election, January 1916: Newington West
Party	Candidate	Votes	%	±%
Liberal	James Daniel Gilbert	2,646	77.1	+23.5
Independent	J. J. Terrett	787	22.9	New
Majority		1,859	54.2	+47.0
Turnout		3,433	35.0	−43.2
Liberal hold		Swing		
