= William O'Donovan =

William O'Donovan may refer to:

- William Rudolf O'Donovan (1844–1920), American sculptor
- William O'Donovan (politician) (1886–1955), Conservative Member of Parliament for Mile End 1931–1935
