= Phil Piratin =

British Communist politician and member of parliament

Member of Parliament for Mile End
- In office 5 July 1945 – 3 February 1950
- Preceded by: Dan Frankel
- Succeeded by: Stoker Edwards (as MP for Stepney)

Personal details
- Born: East End of London; 15 May 1907
- Died: 10 December 1995 (aged 88)
- Party: Communist
- Education: Davenant Foundation School
- Occupation: Political activist; politician; newspaper manager
- Known for: Storming the Savoy Hotel to demand the UK government allows civilians to shelter in the London Underground during the Blitz

Philip Piratin (15 May 1907 – 10 December 1995) was a member of the Communist Party of Great Britain (CPGB) and one of the four CPGB Members of Parliament during the first thirty years of its existence. (The others were Shapurji Saklatvala, Walton Newbold and Willie Gallacher).

== Political career ==
Piratin was the son of a small local tradesman and attended Davenant Foundation School in Whitechapel. He became a Communist activist, anti-fascist and defender of tenants' rights, a leading member of the Stepney Tenants Defence League. Of Jewish origin, he was the leader of the opposition to Oswald Mosley's antisemitism and his British Union of Fascists' marches through East London. Piratin was elected to Stepney Borough Council in 1937 and was Chairman of the borough's Communist Party. During World War II, he gained further notice by leading 100 people to shelter from the Blitz in the basement of the Savoy Hotel, to persuade the Government to open the London Underground stations to anyone sheltering from the bombing, a practice which the Government had previously ruled out, but which then became widespread.

Piratin was elected at the 1945 General Election as Member of Parliament (MP) for Mile End in Stepney, becoming one of the last two CPGB MPs. In Parliament, he worked with several left-wing Labour MPs, some of whom would be expelled by their party as crypto-communists and form the Labour Independent Group. He was defeated when he stood for re-election in 1950 in the new constituency of Stepney; his old seat of Mile End had been abolished due to boundary changes.

Until 1957, Piratin was the circulation manager of the communist newspaper The Daily Worker, but he left early that year, ostensibly over a matter of process. However, in 1991 he told Alison Macleod about his doubts at the time: "In 1956, Phil said, he drove to Oxford, to defend the Party line on Hungary at a meeting of undergraduates. He got as far as outside the hall, stopped – and drove home again. Phil remained in the Party, but he never again worked for it full time. Piratin later became a businessman".

== Publications ==
- Phil Piratin; Our Flag Stays Red, Thames, London (1948).

== See also ==
- List of British Jews

Parliament of the United Kingdom
Preceded by Daniel Frankel	Member of Parliament for Mile End; 1945–1950	Constituency abolished
