= Bertram Straus =

Bertram Straus

Bertram Straus

Bertram Stuart Straus (17 March 1867 – 26 August 1933) was a British businessman and Liberal Party politician.

== Background ==
Born in Manchester, he was the son of Henry S Straus of Sedgley Park, a merchant and vice consul for the Netherlands. Following education at Harrow School he was articled to Hale & Sons, colonial brokers in the City of London. The company specialised in the importation of ostrich feathers, ivory, rubber, mother of pearl, drugs, gums, spices, cocoa, mica, isinglass, fibres and carpets. He subsequently became a partner in the business, from which he retired in 1898. He was later chairman of Virol Limited, manufacturers of "Virol", a malt extract based vitamin preparation.

== Politics ==
Straus entered politics as a member of Marylebone Vestry, and was later elected as a Progressive Party Councillor to represent Mile End on the London County Council in 1898, and was re-elected in 1901 and 1904.

At the 1895 general election Straus was chosen as the Liberal candidate to contest the constituency of Marylebone West, but failed to be elected. At the next general election in 1900 he stood at Tower Hamlets, St George, narrowly failing to be elected.

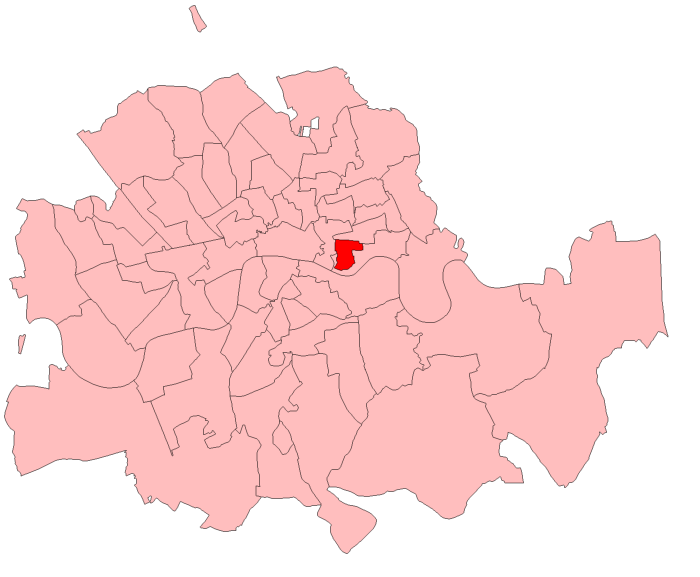
St George's in London County with boundaries used in 1900

General election 1900: Tower Hamlets, St. George Electorate
Party	Candidate	Votes	%	±%
Conservative	Thomas Dewar	1,437	55.7	+5.6
Liberal	Bertram Straus	1,141	44.3	−5.6
Majority		296	11.4	+11.2
Turnout		3,518	73.3	−9.4
Conservative hold		Swing	+5.6	

When the 1905 Mile End by-election was held at Mile End in 1905, Straus came close to winning the seat, losing to the Liberal Unionist candidate Harry Levy-Leveson by 78 votes.

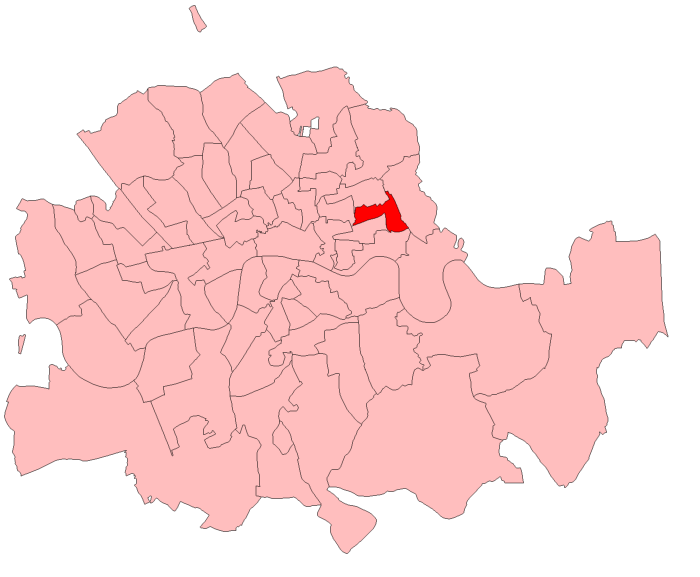
Mile End in London County with boundaries used 1905–1910

1905 Mile End by-election Electorate 5,380
Party	Candidate	Votes	%	±%
Liberal Unionist	Harry Levy-Lawson	2,138	50.9	−14.7
Liberal	Bertram Straus	2,060	49.1	+14.7
Majority		78	1.8	−29.4
Turnout		5,380	78.0	+15.1
Liberal Unionist hold		Swing	-14.7	

When a general election was held in the following year, Straus again faced Levy-Lawson at Mile End and managed to unseat him to become member of parliament.

General election 1906: Tower Hamlets, Mile End Electorate 5,419
Party	Candidate	Votes	%	±%
Liberal	Bertram Straus	2,295	51.4	+2.3
Liberal Unionist	Harry Levy-Lawson	2,169	48.6	−2.3
Majority		126	2.8	4.6
Turnout		5,419	82.4	+4.4
Liberal gain from Liberal Unionist		Swing	+2.3	

Straus was only to hold the seat for a single term, with Levy-Leveson regaining it at the next election in January 1910 by 57 votes.

General election January 1910: Tower Hamlets, Mile End Electorate 5,464
Party	Candidate	Votes	%	±%
Liberal Unionist	Harry Levy-Lawson	2,332	50.6	+2.0
Liberal	Bertram Straus	2,275	49.4	−2.0
Majority		57	1.2	4.0
Turnout			84.3	+1.9
Liberal Unionist gain from Liberal		Swing	+2.0	

When a further election was held in December 1910, Straus and Levy-Lawson again faced each other, with Levy-Lawson holding the seat by only 6 votes.

General election December 1910: Tower Hamlets, Mile End Electorate 5,464
Party	Candidate	Votes	%	±%
Liberal Unionist	Harry Levy-Lawson	2,176	50.1	−0.5
Liberal	Bertram Straus	2,170	49.9	+0.5
Majority		6	0.2	−1.0
Turnout			79.5	−4.8
Liberal Unionist hold		Swing	-0.5	

He did not stand for parliament again.

Straus never married and died at his home at Hyde Park Mansions in August 1933, aged 66. He was cremated at Golders Green Crematorium.

Parliament of the United Kingdom
Preceded by Harry Levy-Lewson	Member of Parliament for Mile End; 1906 – Jan 1910	Succeeded by Harry Levy-Lewson
