= Opinion polling for the 1945 United Kingdom general election =

In the run-up to the 1945 general election, various organisations carry out opinion polling to gauge voting intention. Results of such polls are displayed in this article.

The date range for these opinion polls are from 1943 until late June 1945.

UK opinion polling for the 1945 election Conservative Labour Liberal

== Polling results ==
All data is from PollBase.

=== 1943–1945 ===
Date(s) conducted	Pollster	Client	Con	Lab	Lib	Lead
5 July 1945	1945 general election		36.2%	49.7%	9%	13.5%
24–27 Jun 1945	Gallup	News Chronicle	41%	47%	10.5%	6%
Jun 1945	Centre of Public Opinion	Daily Express	45%	45%	12%	Tie
Jun 1945	Gallup	News Chronicle	37%	45%	15%	8%
May 1945	Gallup	News Chronicle	33%	45%	15%	12%
Apr 1945	Gallup	News Chronicle	28%	47%	14%	19%
Feb 1945	Gallup	News Chronicle	27.5%	47%	12.5%	20%
Jan 1944	Gallup	News Chronicle	28%	45%	12%	17%
Dec 1943	Gallup	News Chronicle	31.5%	46.5%	11.5%	15%
Jul 1943	Gallup	News Chronicle	33%	47.5%	11%	14.5%
Jun 1943	Gallup	News Chronicle	36%	44%	10.5%	8%
Nov 1935	1935 general election		47.8%	38.0%	6.7%	9.8%

=== Before 1943 ===
Date(s) conducted	Pollster	Client	Gov.	Opp.	Don't Know	Lead
Feb 1940	Gallup	N/A	51%	27%	22%	24%
Dec 1939	Gallup	N/A	54%	30%	16%	14%
Feb 1939	Gallup	N/A	50%	44%	6%	6%
