= Dan Frankel (British politician) =

British politician (1900–1988)

Daniel Frankel (18 August 1900 – 16 May 1988) was a Labour Party politician in the United Kingdom. He was Member of Parliament (MP) for Mile End from 1935 to 1945.

Frankel worked as a tailor's cutter, and became prominent in the National Union of Tailors and Garment Workers. He joined the Labour Party, and was elected to Stepney Metropolitan Borough Council. In 1929/30, he served as Mayor of Stepney. At the 1931 London County Council election, he won a seat in Mile End, which he retained until 1946.

At the 1935 United Kingdom general election, Frankel won the Mile End seat from the Conservative MP William O'Donovan. He was the first Jewish Labour Party Member of Parliament for a seat in the East End of London. At the 1945 general election, he lost the seat to the Communist Party candidate Philip Piratin, becoming one of a small number of Labour MPs defeated at the election.

Outside politics, Frankel was active in the Jewish Friendly Societies Movement.

Parliament of the United Kingdom
Preceded by William O'Donovan	Member of Parliament for Mile End; 1935–1945	Succeeded by Philip Piratin
