= Spencer Charrington =

British politician

Charrington in 1895.

Spencer Charrington (24 May 1818 – 11 December 1904) was an English brewer and Conservative politician.

Charrington was the son of Nicholas Charrington and his wife Harriet Milward. His father was a brewer of the firm of Charringtons which was based at the Anchor Brewery in Mile End East London. Charrington became one of the partners in the family firm, and became its chairman on the death of his brother Edward in 1888. He was also a vice-president of the Brewers' Society. In 1881 he lived at Great Gearies, Barkingside but was subsequently of Hunsdon, Hertfordshire.

Charrington was elected MP for Mile End in 1885. He owed his election in the Conservative cause to the support of the large number of his brewery workers. He held the seat for nearly 20 years until his death at the age of 86, by which time he was the oldest member in the House of Commons.

Charrington married Alethe Charlotte Pauline Calmeyer who was from Norway. One of their sons was killed in Egypt and another served in the Boer War. Charrington and his wife are commemorated on a memorial to their son in Holy Trinity Church, Barkingside.

Parliament of the United Kingdom
New constituency	Member of Parliament for Mile End; 1885 – 1904	Succeeded by Harry Levy-Lawson
Preceded by John Mowbray	Oldest Member of Parliament; 1899–1904	Succeeded by Frederick Mappin
