= Charles Cooke (Conservative politician) =

English farmer, cider producer and politician

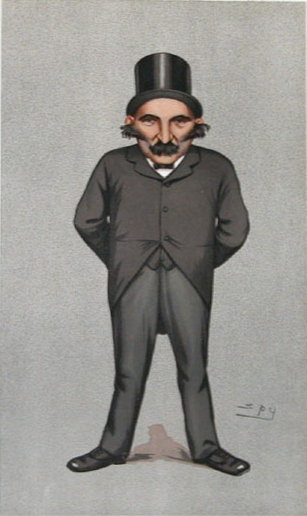
"The Constitutional Union" Cooke as caricatured by Spy (Leslie Ward) in Vanity Fair, July 1892

Charles Wallwyn Radcliffe Cooke (1841 – 26 May 1911) was an English farmer and cider producer and a Conservative Party politician. He sat in the House of Commons from 1885 to 1892 and from 1893 to 1900.

== Biography ==
Cooke was the son of Robert Duffield Cooke of Hellens, Herefordshire. He was educated at Emmanuel College, Cambridge, becoming "Le Bas" Prizeman in 1864, and "Burney" Prizeman in 1866 and 1867 for English Essays. In 1869 he co-wrote with Angelina Gushington Thoughts on Men and Things: A Series of Essays. In 1872, he was called to the bar at Lincoln's Inn, but showed a greater interest in farming in Herefordshire. He was President of Herefordshire Chamber of Agriculture, and Chairman of the Ledbury Highway Board. He wrote pamphlets on political and other questions and authored works on the Agricultural Holdings (England) Act 1875. His particular interest was cider growing and he saw commercial production of cider as a way of stimulating cultivation of orchards during the period of agricultural depression. He was J.P. for Herefordshire.

At the 1885 general election Cooke was elected as the Member of Parliament (MP) for Newington West in South London, where he was re-elected in 1886, but did not contest the seat at the 1892 general election. He returned to Parliament the following year, when he was elected at a by-election in August 1893 as the MP for Hereford and became known as the MP for Cider. He retired from the Commons at the 1900 general election. His book Four Years in Parliament With Hard Labour was republished in 2008.

== Personal life ==
Cooke married Frances Parnther Broome in 1876. Cooke lived at Hellens, Herefordshire and died at the age of 69.

Their eldest daughter Constance Chellingworth Radcliffe Cooke (1877-1963) was active in the women’s suffrage campaign in Herefordshire, and a member of the WSPU, the Labour Party, and later joined CND.

Parliament of the United Kingdom
New constituency	Member of Parliament for Newington West; 1885 – 1892	Succeeded by Cecil Norton
Preceded by William Grenfell	Member of Parliament for Hereford; 1893 – 1900	Succeeded by John Arkwright
