= 1905 Mile End by-election =

UK parliamentary by-election

← 1900	12 January 1905	1906 →

Candidate	Levy-Lawson	Straus
Party	Unionist	Liberal
Popular vote	2,138	2,060
Percentage	50.9%	49.1%
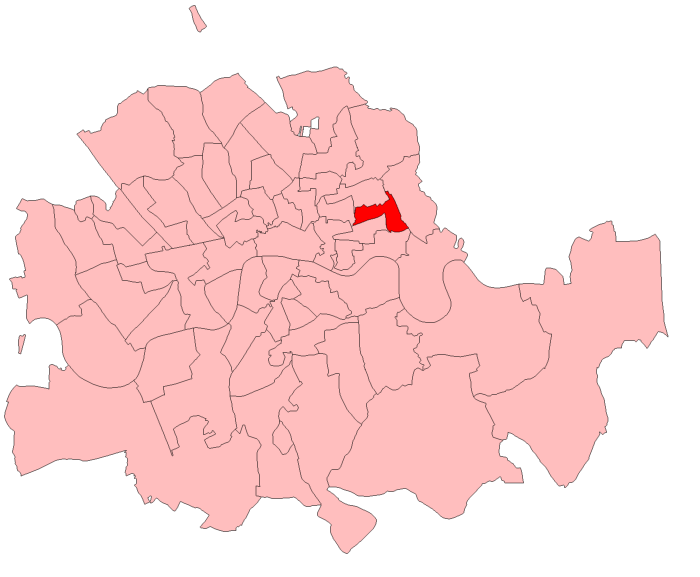
MP before election
Spencer Charrington
Conservative
Subsequent MP
Bertram Straus
Liberal

The 1905 Mile End by-election was a Parliamentary by-election held on 12 January 1905. The constituency returned one Member of Parliament (MP) to the House of Commons of the United Kingdom, elected by the first past the post voting system.

== Vacancy ==
Spencer Charrington had been Conservative MP for the seat of Mile End since the seat's creation at the 1885 general election. He died on 11 December 1904.

== Electoral history ==
Charrington easily held the seat at the last election, with an increased majority:

Charrington

General election 1900: Mile End
Party	Candidate	Votes	%	±%
Conservative	Spencer Charrington	2,440	65.6	+4.5
Liberal	Charles Clarke	1,280	34.4	−4.5
Majority		1,160	31.2	+9.0
Turnout		3,720	62.9	−7.3
Conservative hold		Swing	+4.5	

== Candidates ==
The local Unionist Association selected 43-year-old Liberal Unionist Harry Levy-Lawson as their candidate to defend the seat. He was the son and heir of Edward Levy-Lawson, 1st Baron Burnham. Levy-Lawson was looking to make a return to parliament after a break of ten years. He had sat as a Liberal for St Pancras West from 1885 to 1892 and for Cirencester from 1893 until his defeat in 1895. He had also sat on the London County Council representing St Pancras West from 1889 to 1892.

With a general election expected to take place in the near future, Charles Clarke, who had been the Liberal candidate last time had been selected to contest the seat of Peckham. The local Liberal Association had to choose a new candidate and selected 38-year-old businessman Bertram Straus as their candidate to challenge for the seat. Straus was well known in the constituency as he was one of the two sitting members who represented Mile End on the London County Council. In fact Strauss had represented Mile End since 1898, winning three elections in the process. Straus also had experience of fighting parliamentary elections having contested Marylebone West at the 1900 general election.

The Social Democratic Federation wanted to contest the election but could not secure a willing candidate.

== Campaign ==
Polling Day was fixed for the 12 January 1905, just 32 days after the previous MP died.

The Unionist Governments aborted 1904 Aliens Bill featured in the campaign. The Unionist campaign put the Aliens Bill at the centre of their plans. The Liberal candidate, Straus, who had at first followed party policy in opposing it, later sought to distance himself from the position the Liberal party took in opposing the measure. He declared that he was in favour of excluding "undesirable" aliens. This was understood to target Jewish immigration from Eastern Europe. There was quite a large Jewish community in Mile End. Given that Straus was himself a Jew, this might have seemed an odd position for him to take. There had in fact been a reduction of over 500 voters in Mile End compared with the figures of 1900.

== Result ==
The Liberal Unionist Levy-Lawson held the seat for the government:

Levy-Lawson

Mile End by-election, 1905
Party	Candidate	Votes	%	±%
Liberal Unionist	Harry Levy-Lawson	2,138	50.9	−14.7
Liberal	Bertram Straus	2,060	49.1	+14.7
Majority		78	1.8	−29.4
Turnout		4,198	78.0	+15.1
Liberal Unionist hold		Swing	-14.7	

Straus revealed that he felt that Liberal party opposition to the Aliens Bill may have robbed him of the chance to pull off a sensational victory. The Unionist government was able to force through the Aliens Act 1905 later that year.

== Aftermath ==
When a general election was held in the following year, Straus again faced Levy-Lawson at Mile End and managed to unseat him to become Member of Parliament.

Straus

General election 1906: Mile End
Party	Candidate	Votes	%	±%
Liberal	Bertram Straus	2,295	51.4	+2.3
Liberal Unionist	Harry Levy-Lawson	2,169	48.6	−2.3
Majority		126	2.8	N/A
Turnout		4,464	82.4	+4.4
Liberal gain from Liberal Unionist		Swing	+2.3	
