= Mile End (UK Parliament constituency) =

Parliamentary constituency in the United Kingdom, 1885–1950

- Former borough constituency for the House of Commons
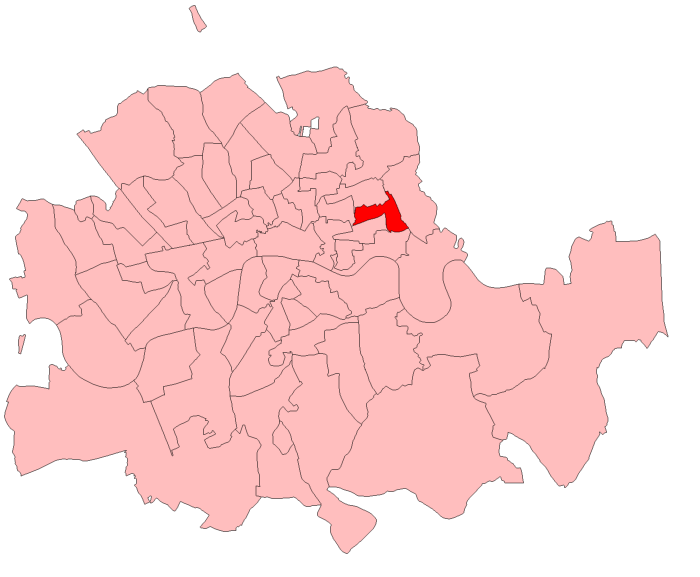
- Mile End in London, 1885-1918

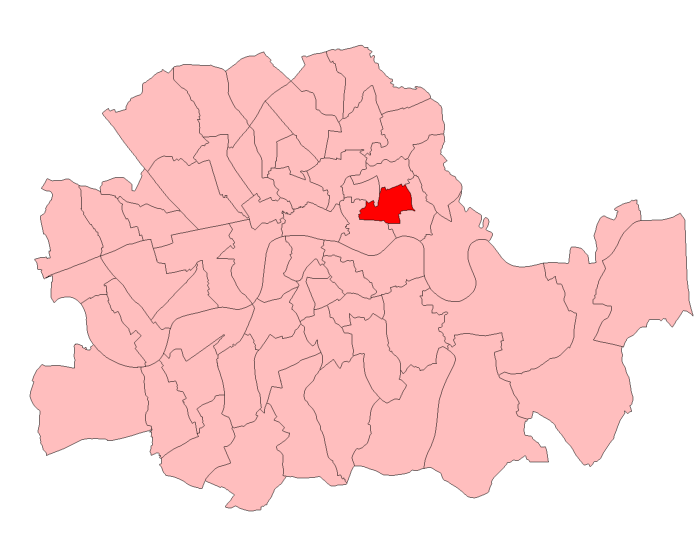
- Mile End in London, 1918-50

1885–1950
- Seats: one
- Created from: Tower Hamlets
- Replaced by: Stepney

Mile End was a parliamentary constituency centred on the Mile End district of the East End of London. It returned one Member of Parliament (MP) to the House of Commons of the Parliament of the United Kingdom.

The constituency was created for the 1885 general election, and abolished for the 1950 general election.

== Boundaries ==

1885–1918: In this period the constituency was a division of the parliamentary borough of Tower Hamlets in east London. The seat was centred upon the community of Mile End including the Mile End Road, which adjoined the Charrington Brewery. The brewery was headed by Spencer Charrington, MP for the area between 1885 and 1904.

Before 1885 the division was administered as part of the county of Middlesex. It formed part of The Metropolis from 1855 to 1889. In 1889 there was a change in the administrative arrangements covering the constituency, with the creation of the County of London. In 1900 London was divided into Metropolitan Boroughs. The Mile End Old Town Parish Vestry was abolished, with Mile End becoming part of the Metropolitan Borough of Stepney.

1918–1950: The constituency became a division of Stepney. The Representation of the People Act 1918 defined it as comprising four local government wards of Mile End Old Town (Centre, North, South and West) as well as the ward of Whitechapel East.

In 1945, the seat became one of only two seats in that Parliament to have a Communist MP elected. Phil Piratin had been a local activist and borough councillor.

In 1950 the constituency was abolished. Its territory became part of the Stepney seat.

== Members of Parliament ==
Year	Member	Party
1885	Spencer Charrington	Conservative
1905	Harry Levy-Lawson	Liberal Unionist
1906	Bertram Straus	Liberal
1910, January	Harry Levy-Lawson	Liberal Unionist ^{a}
1916	Warwick Brookes	Unionist
1918	Sir Walter Preston	Unionist ^{b}
1923	John Scurr	Labour
1931	William O'Donovan	Conservative
1935	Daniel Frankel	Labour
1945	Phil Piratin	Communist
1950	constituency abolished	

Notes:-

- ^{a} The Liberal Unionist Party formally merged into the Conservative Party in 1912.
- ^{b} Coalition Unionist 1918–1922.

== Election results ==
=== Elections in the 1880s ===
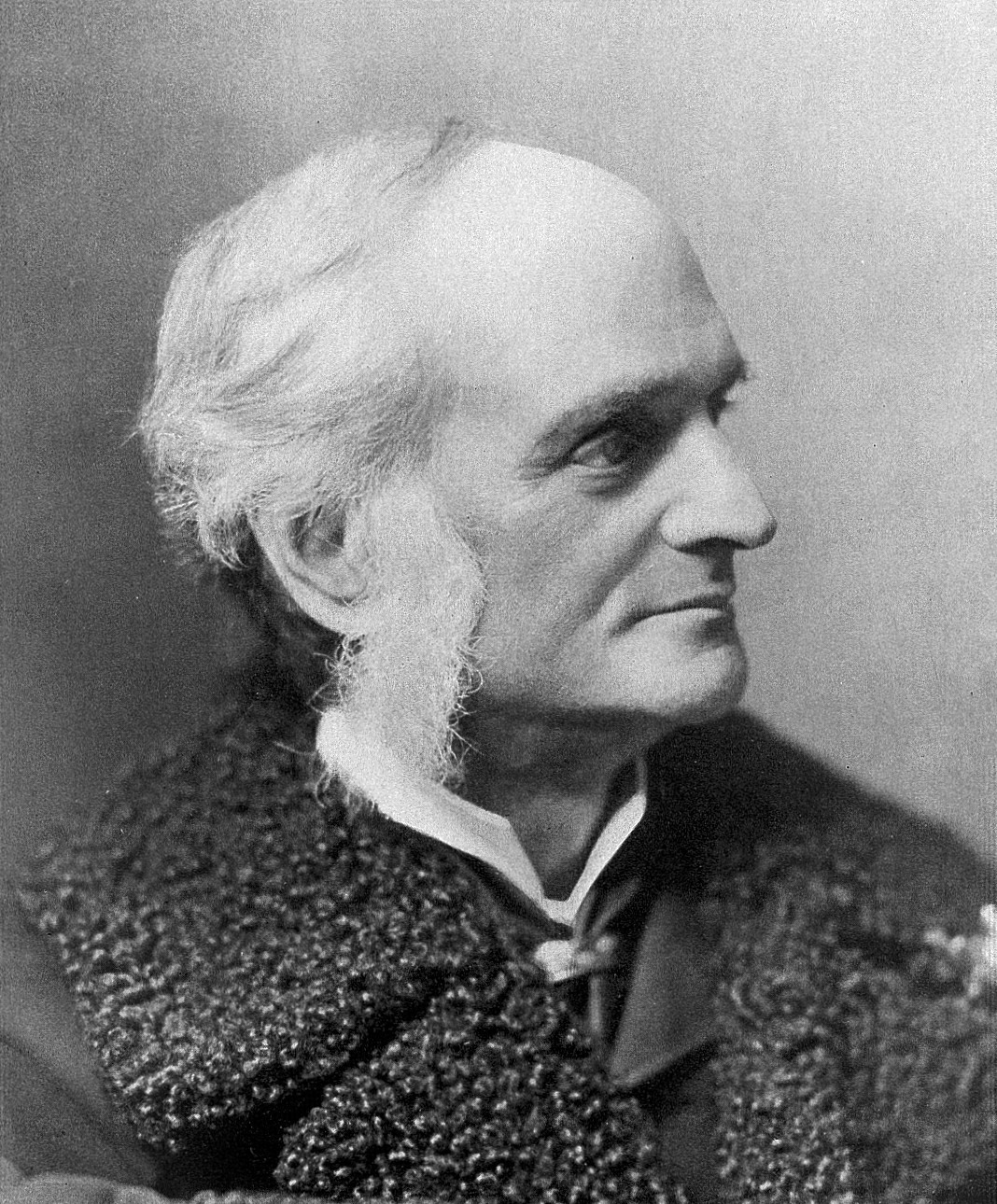
Hart

General election 1885: Mile End
Party	Candidate	Votes	%	±%
Conservative	Spencer Charrington	2,091	52.9	
Liberal	Ernest Hart	1,442	36.5	
Independent Liberal	Acton Smee Ayrton	420	10.6	
Majority		649	16.4	
Turnout		3,953	68.1	
Registered electors		5,804		
Conservative win (new seat)				

Charrington

General election 1886: Mile End
Party	Candidate	Votes	%	±%
Conservative	Spencer Charrington	2,110	62.2	+9.3
Liberal	Arnold White	1,281	37.8	+1.3
Majority		829	24.4	+8.0
Turnout		3,391	58.4	−9.7
Registered electors		5,804		
Conservative hold		Swing	+4.0	

=== Elections in the 1890s ===
General election 1892: Mile End
Party	Candidate	Votes	%	±%
Conservative	Spencer Charrington	2,204	53.3	−8.9
Liberal	James Haysman	1,931	46.7	+8.9
Majority		273	6.6	−17.8
Turnout		4,135	72.1	+13.7
Registered electors		5,738		
Conservative hold		Swing	-8.9	

General election 1895: Mile End
Party	Candidate	Votes	%	±%
Conservative	Spencer Charrington	2,383	61.1	+7.8
Liberal	James Haysman	1,516	38.9	−7.8
Majority		867	22.2	+15.6
Turnout		3,899	70.2	−1.9
Registered electors		5,551		
Conservative hold		Swing	+7.8	

=== Elections in the 1900s ===

General election 1900: Mile End
Party	Candidate	Votes	%	±%
Conservative	Spencer Charrington	2,440	65.6	+4.5
Liberal	Charles Clarke	1,280	34.4	−4.5
Majority		1,160	31.2	+9.0
Turnout		3,720	62.9	−7.3
Registered electors		5,915		
Conservative hold		Swing	+4.5	

1905 Mile End by-election
Party	Candidate	Votes	%	±%
Liberal Unionist	Harry Levy-Lawson	2,138	50.9	−14.7
Liberal	Bertram Straus	2,060	49.1	+14.7
Majority		78	1.8	−29.4
Turnout		4,198	78.0	+15.1
Registered electors		5,380		
Liberal Unionist hold		Swing	-14.7	

Straus

General election 1906: Mile End
Party	Candidate	Votes	%	±%
Liberal	Bertram Straus	2,295	51.4	+17.0
Liberal Unionist	Harry Levy-Lawson	2,169	48.6	−17.0
Majority		126	2.8	N/A
Turnout		4,464	82.4	+19.5
Registered electors		5,419		
Liberal gain from Liberal Unionist		Swing	+17.0	

=== Elections in the 1910s ===
Levy-Lawson

General election January 1910: Mile End
Party	Candidate	Votes	%	±%
Liberal Unionist	Harry Levy-Lawson	2,332	50.6	+2.0
Liberal	Bertram Straus	2,275	49.4	−2.0
Majority		57	1.2	N/A
Turnout		4,607	84.3	+1.9
Liberal Unionist gain from Liberal		Swing	+2.0	

Straus

General election December 1910: Mile End
Party	Candidate	Votes	%	±%
Liberal Unionist	Harry Levy-Lawson	2,176	50.1	−0.5
Liberal	Bertram Straus	2,170	49.9	+0.5
Majority		6	0.2	−1.0
Turnout		4,346	79.5	−4.8
Liberal Unionist hold		Swing	-0.5	

General Election 1914–15:

Another General Election was required to take place before the end of 1915. The political parties had been making preparations for an election to take place and by July 1914, the following candidates had been selected;

- Unionist: Harry Levy-Lawson
- Liberal: Bertram Straus

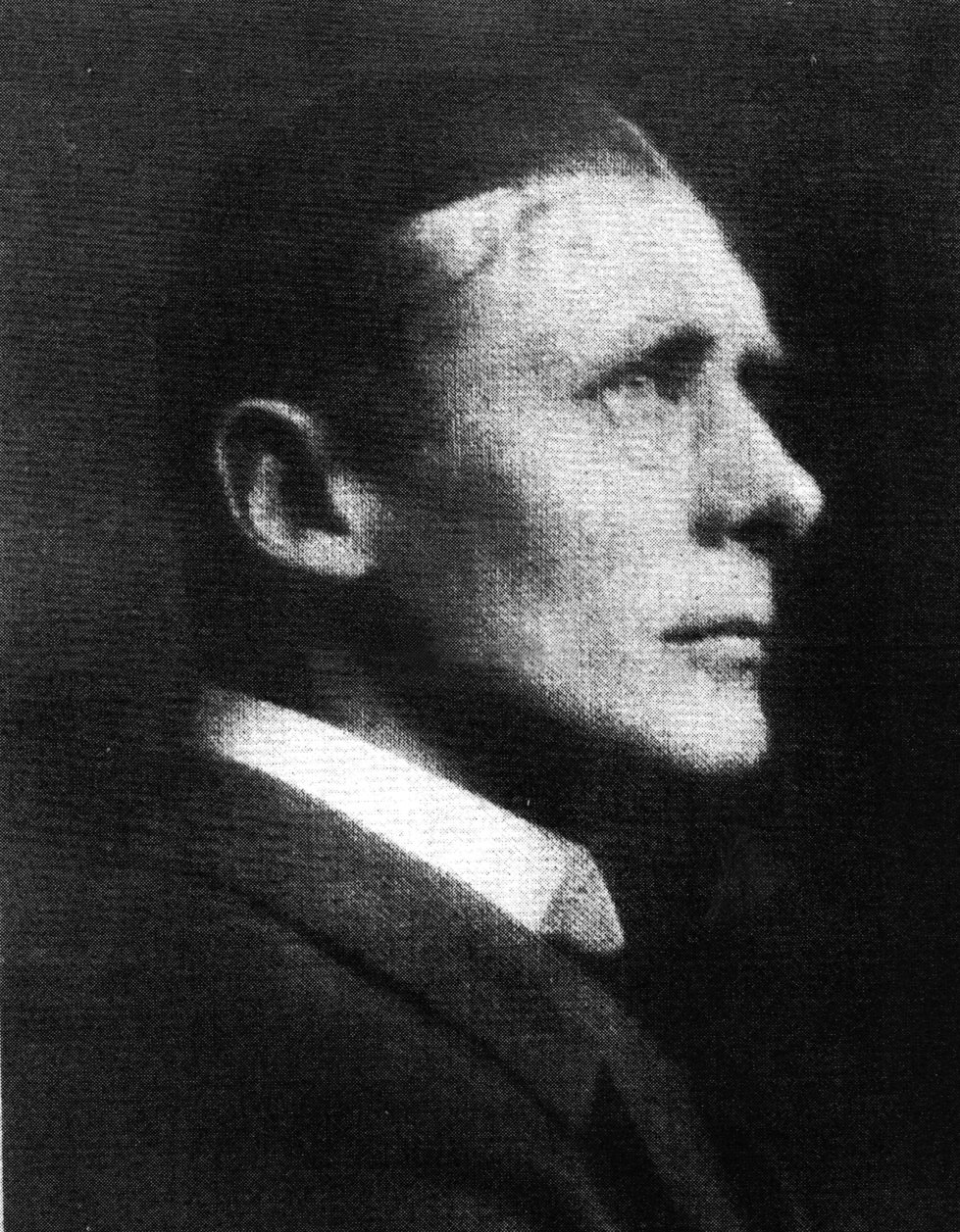
Billing

1916 Mile End by-election
Party	Candidate	Votes	%	±%
Unionist	Warwick Brookes	1,991	55.2	+5.1
Independent	Noel Pemberton Billing	1,615	44.8	New
Majority		376	10.4	+10.2
Turnout		3,606		
Unionist hold		Swing		

General election 1918: Stepney, Mile End
Party		Candidate	Votes	%	±%
C	Unionist	Walter Preston	6,025	63.2	+13.1
	Labour	William Devenay	2,392	25.1	New
	Liberal	Charles John Ough Sanders	1,119	11.7	−38.2
Majority			3,633	38.1	+37.9
Turnout			9,536	43.1	−36.4
	Unionist hold		Swing		
C indicates candidate endorsed by the coalition government.

=== Elections in the 1920s ===
General election 1922: Mile End
Party	Candidate	Votes	%	±%
Unionist	Walter Preston	6,014	41.0	−22.2
Labour	John Scurr	5,219	35.5	+10.4
Liberal	Robert Bernard Solomon	3,457	23.5	+11.8
Majority		795	5.5	−32.6
Turnout		14,690	63.8	+20.7
Unionist hold		Swing	-16.3	

General election 1923: Mile End
Party	Candidate	Votes	%	±%
Labour	John Scurr	6,219	41.0	+5.5
Unionist	Walter Preston	4,741	31.2	−9.8
Liberal	Robert Bernard Solomon	4,215	27.8	+4.3
Majority		1,478	9.8	N/A
Turnout		15,175	63.8	0.0
Labour gain from Unionist		Swing	+7.6	

General election 1924: Stepney, Mile End
Party	Candidate	Votes	%	±%
Labour	John Scurr	8,306	48.5	+7.5
Unionist	Johnnie Dodge	4,960	28.9	−2.3
Liberal	Solomon Teff	3,872	22.6	−5.2
Majority		3,346	19.6	+9.8
Turnout		17,138	70.7	+6.9
Labour hold		Swing	+4.9	

General election 1929: Stepney, Mile End
Party	Candidate	Votes	%	±%
Labour	John Scurr	11,489	47.1	−1.4
Unionist	Johnnie Dodge	7,401	30.3	+1.4
Liberal	Solomon Teff	5,525	22.6	0.0
Majority		4,088	16.8	−2.8
Turnout		24,415	70.4	−0.3
Labour hold		Swing	-1.4	

=== Elections in the 1930s ===
General election 1931: Stepney, Mile End
Party	Candidate	Votes	%	±%
Conservative	William O'Donovan	12,399	56.0	+25.7
Labour	John Scurr	9,738	44.0	−3.1
Majority		2,661	12.0	−4.8
Turnout		22,137	60.0	−10.4
Conservative gain from Labour		Swing	+14.4	

General election 1935: Stepney, Mile End
Party	Candidate	Votes	%	±%
Labour	Daniel Frankel	13,177	57.2	+13.2
Conservative	William O'Donovan	9,859	42.8	−13.2
Majority		3,318	14.4	+2.4
Turnout		23,036	63.5	+3.5
Labour gain from Conservative		Swing	+13.2	

=== Elections in the 1940s ===
General Election 1939–40

Another General Election was required to take place before the end of 1940. The political parties had been making preparations for an election to take place and by the Autumn of 1939, the following candidates had been selected;

- Labour: Daniel Frankel
- Conservative:

General election 1945: Stepney, Mile End
Party	Candidate	Votes	%	±%
Communist	Phil Piratin	5,075	47.6	New
Labour	Daniel Frankel	3,861	36.2	−21.0
Conservative	V. Motion	1,722	16.2	−26.6
Majority		1,214	11.4	N/A
Turnout		10,658	65.9	+2.4
Communist gain from Labour		Swing		
