= Harry Levy-Lawson, 1st Viscount Burnham =

British newspaper proprietor

The Right Honourable The Viscount Burnham GCMG CH TD JP DL
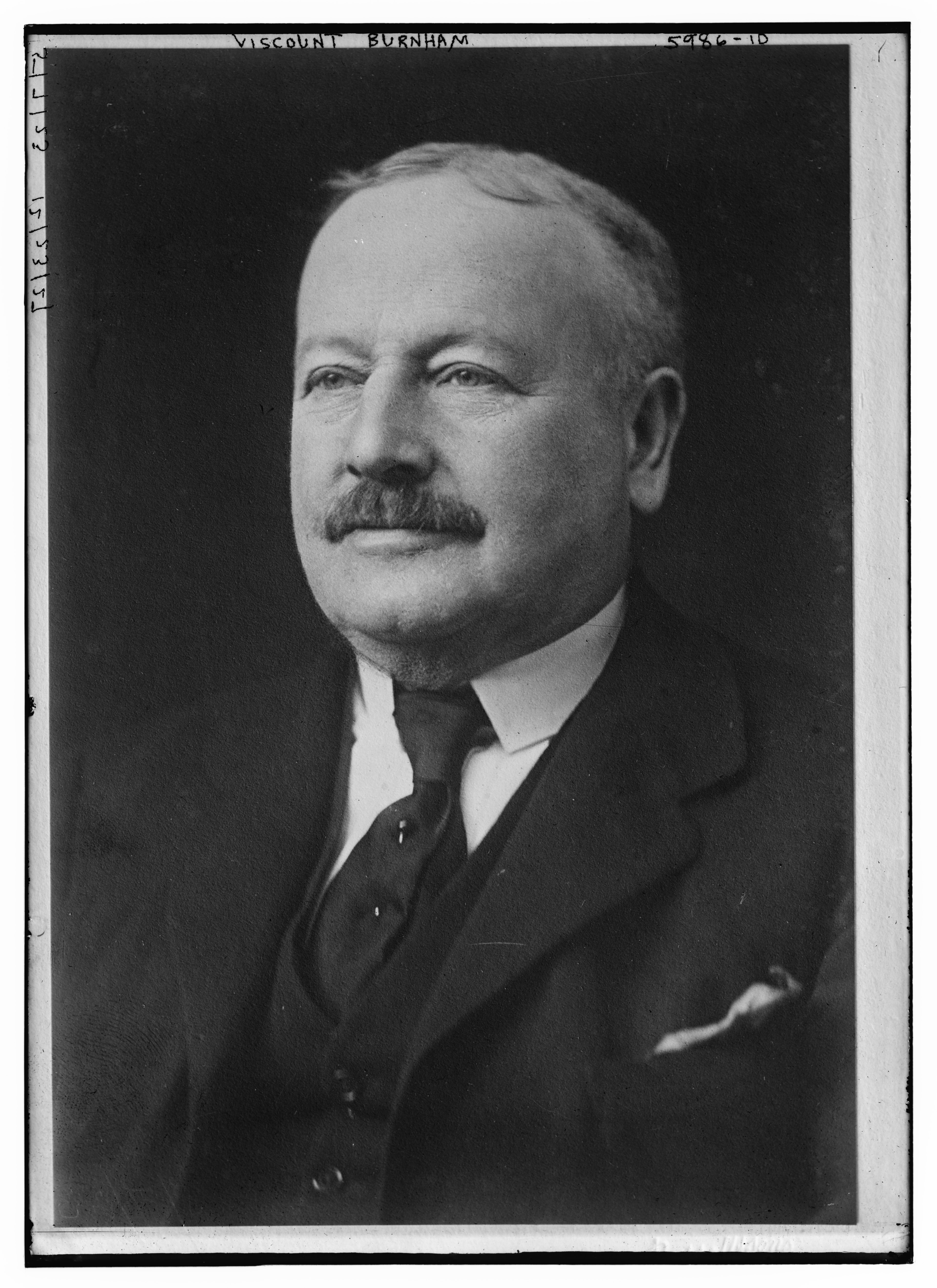

Member of the House of Lords
- Lord Temporal
- In office 9 January 1916 – 20 July 1933
- Preceded by: The 1st Baron Burnham
- Succeeded by: The 3rd Baron Burnham

Personal details
- Born: Harry Lawson Webster Levy; 18 December 1862 St Pancras, London, England
- Died: 20 June 1933 (aged 70)
- Resting place: Beaconsfield, Buckinghamshire, England
- Party: Liberal Party; Liberal Unionist Party; Conservative Party
- Spouse: Olive de Bathe (m. 1884)
- Children: 1
- Parents: Edward Levy-Lawson, 1st Baron Burnham; Harriette Georgiana Webster
- Education: Eton College
- Alma mater: Balliol College, Oxford
- Occupation: Newspaper owner

Harry Lawson Webster Levy-Lawson, 1st Viscount Burnham, GCMG, CH, TD, JP, DL (18 December 1862 – 20 July 1933), was a British newspaper proprietor. He was originally a Liberal politician before joining the Liberal Unionist Party in the late 1890s. He sat in the House of Commons 1885–1892, 1893–1895, 1905–1906 and 1910–1916 until he inherited the Burnham barony on the death of his father.

== Biography ==
Levy-Lawson was born in St Pancras, London, in 1862, the son of Edward Levy (who was created Baron Burnham in 1903) and his wife Harriette Georgiana Webster. The family name was legally changed from Levy to Levy-Lawson on 11 December 1875.

He was educated at Cheam School, Headley, Berkshire, Eton and Balliol College, Oxford. He became a lieutenant in the Royal Buckinghamshire Yeomanry, treasurer of the Free Land League, vice president of the Municipal Reform League, and a member of the executive committee of Municipal Federation League. In 1891, he was admitted to the Inner Temple, entitling him to practise as a barrister.

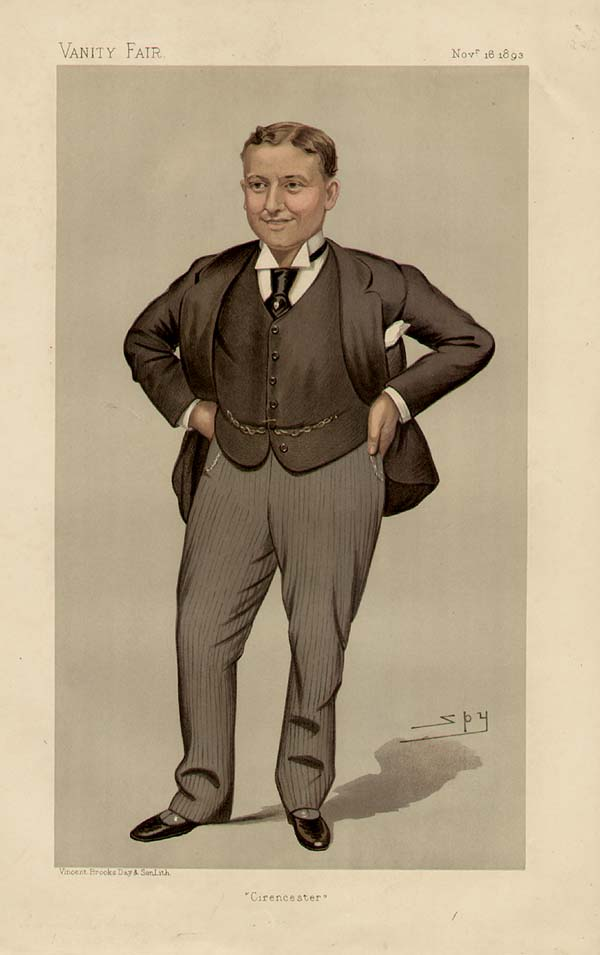
"Cirencester". Levy-Lawson as caricatured by "Spy" (Leslie Ward) in Vanity Fair, November 1893

Levy-Lawson was elected Member of Parliament (MP) for St Pancras West in the 1885 general election at the age of 23, but lost the seat in the 1892 general election. He was also a member of the London County Council from 1889 to 1892, for St Pancras West.

He was returned to the Commons as MP for Cirencester at a by-election in 1893 and held the seat until his defeat at the 1895 general election. In 1905 he was elected at a by-election as MP for Mile End and lost the seat in 1906, regaining it in January 1910. In the interim he was Mayor of Stepney between 1907 and 1909. In 1911, he was appointed a deputy lieutenant of Buckinghamshire.

Levy-Lawson was appointed a captain in the Royal Buckinghamshire Yeomanry on 1 May 1887, and later gained the honorary rank of major. He was promoted to lieutenant-colonel and appointed in command of the regiment on 18 October 1902.

He saw active service in the First World War, where he was mentioned in despatches. In 1916, on the death of his father, he succeeded to the titles of Baron Burnham and the baronetcy and took his seat in the House of Lords. He also succeeded his father in the management and ownership of The Daily Telegraph. He was decorated with the Territorial Decoration (TD) and became Honorary Colonel of the 99th (Bucks and Berks Yeomanry) Brigade, Royal Artillery. He was invested as a Member of the Order of the Companions of Honour (CH) in 1917.

He was the first chairman of the Burnham Committees on teachers' pay, which were named after him.

=== Family, interests and Hall Barn ===
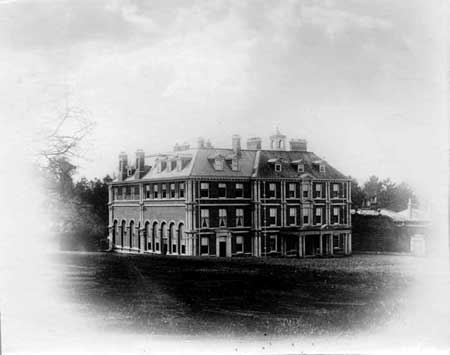
Hall Barn, around 1900

Levy-Lawson was created Viscount Burnham, of Hall Barn, in the County of Buckingham, on 16 May 1919. He married Olive de Bathe, daughter of Sir Henry de Bathe, 4th Baronet, and Charlotte Clare, on 2 January 1884 at St. Margaret's Church, Westminster. They had one daughter, Dorothy Olive Lawson (1885–1937), who married Major John Spencer Coke (son of Thomas Coke, 2nd Earl of Leicester) and with whom she had three children: Gerald, Celia and Rosemary Coke – the latter later Baroness Hamilton of Dalzell.

His father, who was "one of the Prince of Wales' set", had purchased the 4,000-acre Hall Barn estate in 1880. Viscount Burnham and his father hosted King Edward VII and his son, King George V, and his son King Edward VIII on many occasions from the early 1900s to the 1930s. On 19 December 1924, for example, Burnham hosted a dinner party for King George V with Rudyard Kipling, Harry's daughter, Dorothy Levy-Lawson, and her husband, Major Sir John Coke, amongst the guests.

Viscount Burnham was a JP for Buckinghamshire. He received a number of honorary doctorates from McGill University, Montreal, in 1920, Durham University in 1921, Athens University, Greece, in 1924, University of Western Australia, Perth, Australia, in 1925, Ghent University, Belgium, in 1927 and Cambridge University. He was invested as a Knight Grand Cross, GCMG, in 1927. In 1928 he sold The Daily Telegraph to Lord Camrose and Lord Kemsley of Allied Newspapers, with Camrose taking over as editor-in-chief.

He died aged 70 and was buried near his father on 24 July 1933 at Beaconsfield, Buckinghamshire. Burnham had no surviving male issue so the viscountcy became extinct: his younger brother, William Levy-Lawson (1864–1943), succeeded to the baronetcy and barony.

== Arms ==
Coat of arms of Harry Levy-Lawson, 1st Viscount Burnham
Escutcheon Quarterly 1st & 4th Azure three bars gemel Argent over all a winged morion Or 2nd & 3rd Gules a saltire double parted and fretted Or between in fess two rams' heads couped in fess Argent. Supporters Dexter the figure of Clio the Muse of history Proper sinister the figure of Hermes vested Argent mantled Azure on the head of a winged morion on his heels wings and in his exterior hand a caduceus Or. Motto Of Old I Hold

Parliament of the United Kingdom
New constituency	Member of Parliament for St Pancras West; 1885–1892	Succeeded by Harry Graham
Preceded by Thomas Chester-Master	Member of Parliament for Cirencester; 1893–1895	Succeeded by Benjamin Bathurst
Preceded by Spencer Charrington	Member of Parliament for Mile End; 1905–1906	Succeeded by Bertram Straus
Preceded by Bertram Straus	Member of Parliament for Mile End; Jan 1910 – 1916	Succeeded by Warwick Brookes
Peerage of the United Kingdom
New creation	Viscount Burnham; 1919–1933	Extinct
Preceded by Edward Levy-Lawson	Baron Burnham; 1916–1933; Member of the House of Lords (1916–1933)	Succeeded by William Levy-Lawson
Baronetage of the United Kingdom
Preceded by Edward Levy-Lawson	Baronet of Hall Barn; 1916–1933	Succeeded by William Levy-Lawson
