= Cecil Norton, 1st Baron Rathcreedan =

British politician

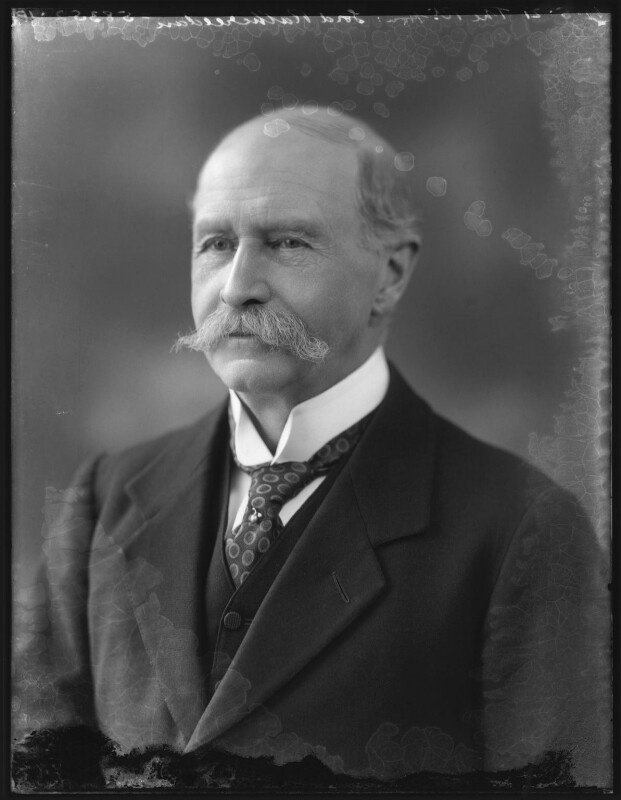
Cecil Norton

Cecil William Norton, 1st Baron Rathcreedan (23 June 1850 – 7 December 1930) was a British Liberal Party politician.

Norton was the son of William Norton, Rector of Baltinglass, Ireland. He was elected to the House of Commons for Newington West in 1892, a seat he held until 1916, and served under Sir Henry Campbell-Bannerman and H. H. Asquith as a Junior Lord of the Treasury from 1905 to 1910 and as Assistant Postmaster-General from 1910 to 1916. The latter year he was raised to the peerage as Baron Rathcreedan, of Bellehatch Park in the County of Oxford. He later held office under David Lloyd George as Assistant Parliamentary Secretary (unpaid) to the Ministry of Munitions and Supply from 1919 to 1921.

Lord Rathcreedan married, firstly, Cecilia, daughter of James Kennedy and widow of William Thomas Cavendish, in 1880. After her death in 1898 he married, secondly, Marguerite Cecil, daughter of Sir Charles Philip Huntington, 1st Baronet, in 1903. He died in December 1930, aged 80, and was succeeded in the barony by his son from his second marriage, Charles. Lady Rathcreedan died in 1955.

== Arms ==
Coat of arms of Cecil Norton, 1st Baron Rathcreedan
Crest A tiger’s head couped at the neck holding in the mouth a broken spear in bend Proper. Escutcheon Per fess Or and Azure in chief a lion passant Sable and in base a maunch Ermine. Supporters On either side a tiger reguardant Proper collared and chained Argent the collar of that on the dexter side charged with three roses Gules and that on the sinister side with three trefoils Vert. Motto Frangas Non Flectes

== Notes ==
Parliament of the United Kingdom
Preceded by Charles Wallwyn Radcliffe Cooke	Member of Parliament for Newington West; 1892 – 1916	Succeeded by James Daniel Gilbert
Peerage of the United Kingdom
New creation	Baron Rathcreedan; 1916–1930	Succeeded by Charles Patrick Norton
