= James Daniel Gilbert =

British politician, banker and City merchant

James Daniel Gilbert (5 February 1864 – 26 September 1941) was a British Liberal politician, banker and City merchant. He was born and brought up in West Newington, a part of London around what is now the Elephant and Castle and was educated privately.

== London County Council ==
Involved in Liberal politics from the 1880s, Gilbert started his political career on the London County Council (LCC). In 1898 he was elected Progressive Party member for his home area of West Newington. In 1919 he was elected for the re-drawn seat of Southwark Central and re-elected in 1922;

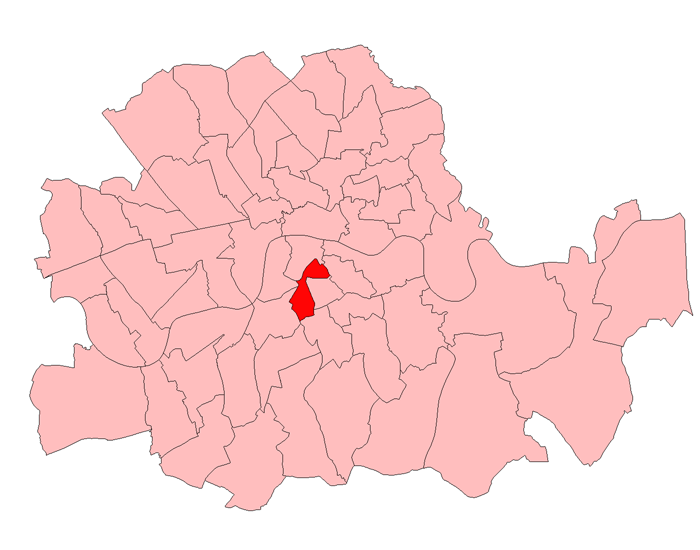
Southwark Central in the London County area 1918-49

1922 London County Council election: Southwark Central Electorate 26,699
| Party | Candidate | Votes | % | ±% |
|---|---|---|---|---|
| Progressive | ✓ James Daniel Gilbert | 6,374 | 35.9 | n/a |
| Progressive | ✓ George H Cook | 6,154 | 34.7 | n/a |
| Labour | Lewis Silkin | 2,618 | 14.7 | n/a |
| Labour | W Barrett | 2,611 | 14.7 | n/a |
| Majority | | 3,536 | 20.0 | n/a |
| Progressive hold | | Swing | n/a | |
| Progressive hold | | Swing | n/a | |

He represented the seat as a Liberal right through until 1928, by which time it had been renamed Central Southwark, losing by just 56 votes to Labour.

During his time on the LCC Gilbert held many committee chairmanships, including those responsible for Corporate Property, the Fire Brigade and Rivers. He was also Progressive Chief Whip from 1901 to 1907. He was particularly involved with issues of transport, campaigning to keep public transport fares low, to ease travelling conditions for passengers and reduce accidents. He took a special interest in transport questions on and around the River Thames. He proposed a resolution for a Circular Overbridge and for trams along the Embankment. He was later instrumental in securing a Steamboats Bill and organised the first services. Gilbert was a member of the Port of London Authority between 1913 and 1939 and chaired its River Committee from 1934 to 1939. He was the LCC representative on the Thames Conservancy and was its chairman for the year 1937–38. He was a member of the River Wandle Advisory Committee from 1928 to 1935. He was also an early proponent for the new County Hall building to be located overlooking the Thames near Westminster Bridge. He served as the LCC nominee on the Council of Morley College. Gilbert acquired the reputation of being a master of detail as a politician on the LCC and was an expert at asking questions to elicit information useful to his causes. He was said to have carried those skills into his Parliamentary career.

== Liberal MP ==
Gilbert entered the House of Commons at a by-election in January 1916 in his home constituency and LCC seat of West Newington. The sitting Member of Parliament (MP), Captain Cecil Norton, who had held the seat since 1892 was given a peerage. The Unionist candidate, Warwick Brookes, decided to stand aside in the by-election under the terms of a truce between the political parties during the war and endorsed Gilbert's candidacy. This left Gilbert a straight fight with independent Labour candidate, J J Terrett and he won the contest easily by 2,646 votes to Terrett's 787. Brookes’ decision to give way may have been influenced by the fact that he was soon after adopted as Coalition Unionist candidate for Mile End which he went on to win. Like its equivalent LCC seat, the West Newington Parliamentary constituency was renamed for the 1918 general election. It became Central Southwark and Gilbert held it at the general elections of 1918, 1922 and 1923, this time in a three-cornered contest, before losing to Labour in 1924, again in a three-cornered fight.

While in Parliament Gilbert served as a member of the Select committee on Transport (1918) and was a member of the Select Committee on London Traffic (1919). Gilbert was appointed a deputy lieutenant of London on 20 July 1920. He was chairman of the Kennington Park Extension Committee (1921) which bought land that became the swimming pool, flower garden and children's playground and was a trustee of the Crystal Palace. He was also a chairman of Standing Committees of the House of Commons in 1923 and 1924. He was elected chairman of the London Liberal MPs' Group in 1919, 1922 and 1924.

== Travel ==
Gilbert travelled extensively in his public and private life. He visited India, Burma, Australia, New Zealand, Canada, the United States, Egypt, Morocco and Russia. During the First World War he went to the French and Belgian Battle Fronts. He was presented with vote of thanks (on vellum) by the British Red Cross Society and Order of St John of Jerusalem in 1918, for organising River Trips for Wounded Soldiers during the war.

== Publications ==
Gilbert published two books; Two and a Half Years’ Record of the Moderate Party, published by the London Reform Union, 1909 and The Record of the Second Moderate Council, London Reform Union, 1912

== Family ==
Gilbert was married twice. His first wife died in 1921 and he was remarried in 1926 to Jessie Bromley. He had a brother John Gilbert who was also a member of the London County Council but John sat on the Municipal Reform Party (or Conservative) benches. John Gilbert was a Roman Catholic but James was an agnostic. According to someone who knew them both, they never spoke to each other and were completely opposite in character.

Gilbert died in Stourbridge, Worcestershire on 26 September 1941.

Parliament of the United Kingdom
| Preceded by Cecil William Norton | Member of Parliament for Newington West; 1916 – 1918 | Constituency abolished |
| New constituency | Member of Parliament for Southwark Central; 1918 – 1924 | Succeeded by Harry Day |
