= Baron Rathcreedan =

Barony in the Peerage of the United Kingdom

Baron Rathcreedan, of Bellehatch Park in the County of Oxford, is a title in the Peerage of the United Kingdom. It was created 27 January 1916 for the Liberal politician Cecil Norton. He had previously represented Newington West in the House of Commons and served as a Junior Lord of the Treasury from 1905 to 1910 and as Assistant Postmaster-General between 1910 and 1916. Since 1990, the title is held by his grandson, the third Baron.

== Barons Rathcreedan (1916) ==
- Cecil William Norton, 1st Baron Rathcreedan (1850–1930)
- Charles Patrick Norton, 2nd Baron Rathcreedan (1905–1990)
- Christopher John Norton, 3rd Baron Rathcreedan (b. 1949)

The heir presumptive is the present holder's brother the Hon. Adam Gregory Norton (b. 1952). There are no other heirs to the title.

== Arms ==
Coat of arms of Baron Rathcreedan
| Crest A tiger’s head couped at the neck holding in the mouth a broken spear in bend Proper. Escutcheon Per fess Or and Azure in chief a lion passant Sable and in base a maunch Ermine. Supporters On either side a tiger reguardant Proper collared and chained Argent the collar of that on the dexter side charged with three roses Gules and that on the sinister side with three trefoils Vert. Motto Frangas Non Flectes |
