= William O'Donovan (politician) =

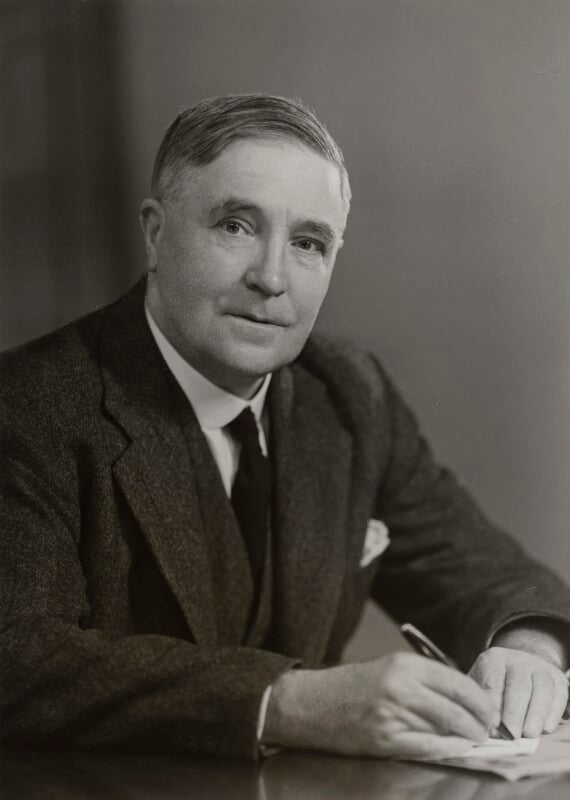
O'Donovan in 1950

Dr William James O'Donovan OBE (1886 – 13 January 1955) was a British dermatologist and Conservative Party politician.

Born in Tonbridge, Kent, he was the son of Patrick O'Donovan from Clonakilty, County Cork, Ireland and his wife Beatrice née Gibson of Eynsford. He was educated at the University of London and abroad.

He began his medical career as a registrar at the London Hospital, and became a well-known figure in the East End of London. He went to become a Consulting Physician in skin departments in a number of hospitals in the capital, and served a president of the Dermatological Section of the British Medical Association.

Politically a Conservative, from 1931 to 1935 he was Member of Parliament (MP) for Mile End. He attempted to return to the Commons at the 1950 general election, unsuccessfully contesting Fulham West.

An active Roman Catholic, he was awarded the papal Order of St. Gregory the Great. He was also appointed as an officer of the Order of the British Empire.

Parliament of the United Kingdom
Preceded by John Scurr	Member of Parliament for Mile End; 1931–1935	Succeeded by Daniel Frankel
