= Solomon Teff =

British Jewish community leader

- Preceded by: Abraham Moss
- Succeeded by: Michael Fidler

President of the Board of Deputies of British Jews
- In office 1964–1967

Personal details
- Died: 1979

Solomon Teff was a solicitor and the president of the Board of Deputies of British Jews from 1964 to 1967. He was a member of the Hove Hebrew Congregation in Brighton and Hove.

Teff became acting president of the Board of Deputies upon the death of Abraham Moss and was succeeded by Michael Fidler. In 1964, as head of the Board of Deputies he spoke before the Twenty-Sixth Zionist Congress praising British Jews who migrated to Israel.

Teff died in 1979.
