= 1945 United Kingdom general election =

- 5 July 1945

All 640 seats in the House of Commons 321 seats needed for a majority
- Opinion polls
- Registered: 33,672,036
- Turnout: 25,095,195; 72.8% (▲1.7 pp)
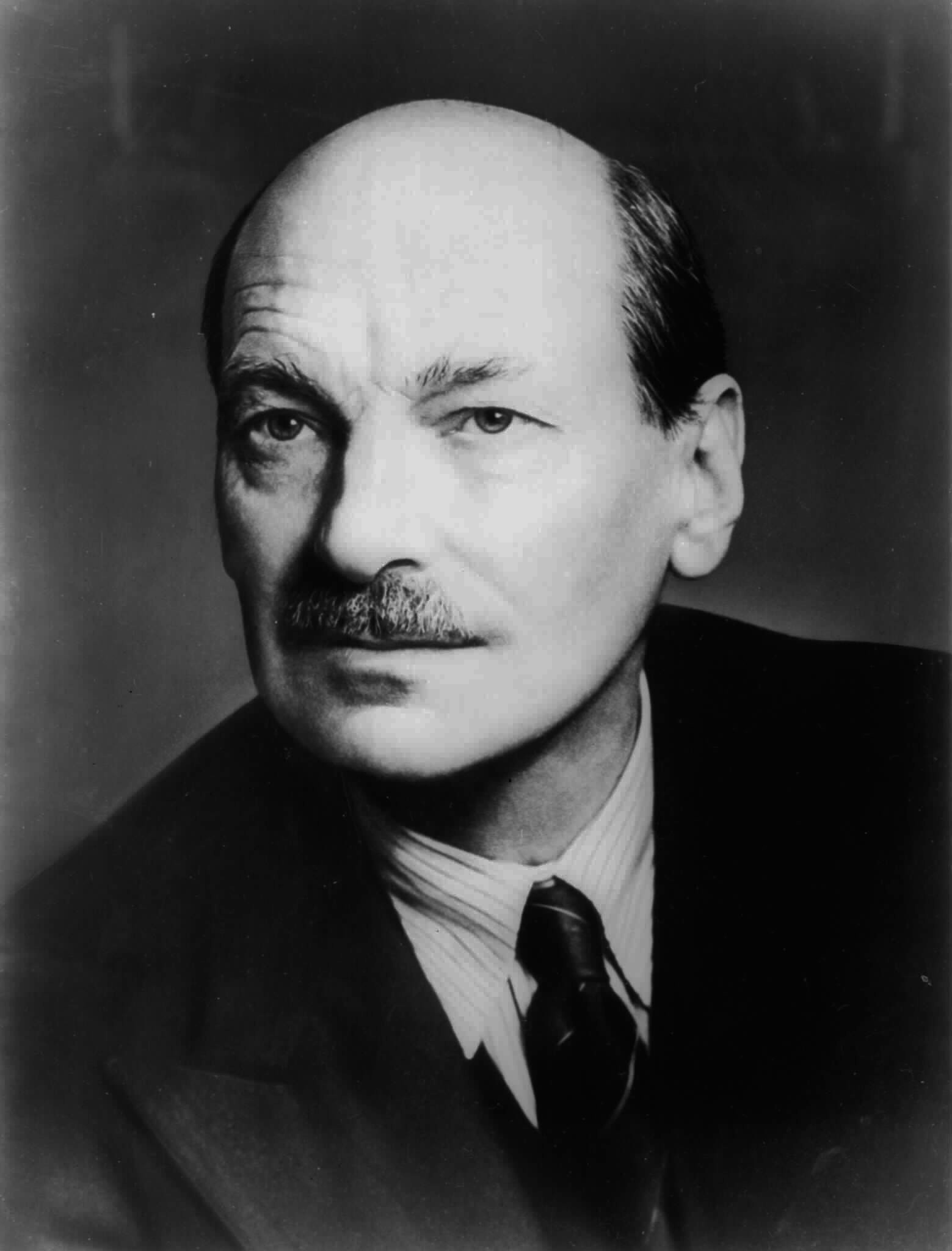

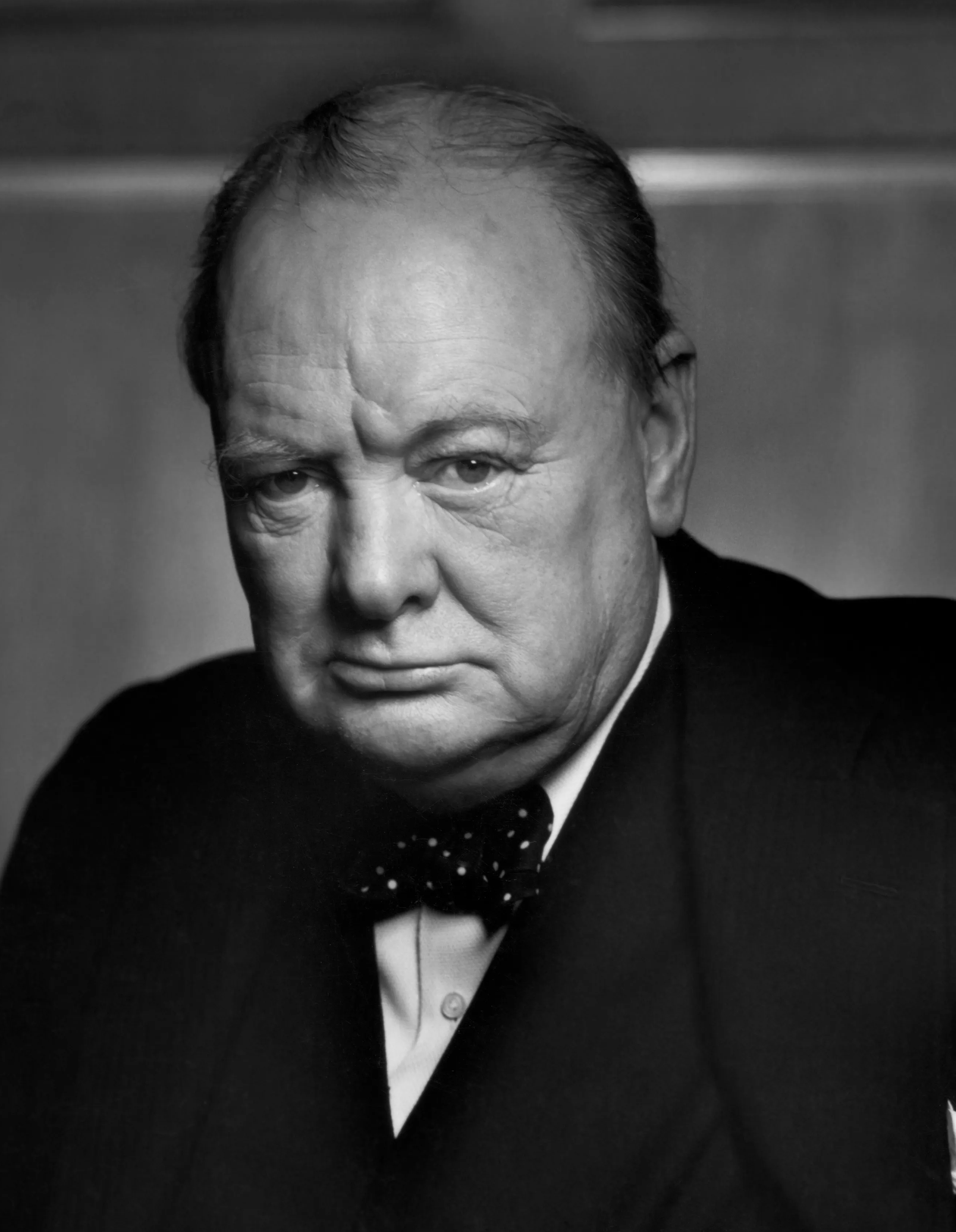

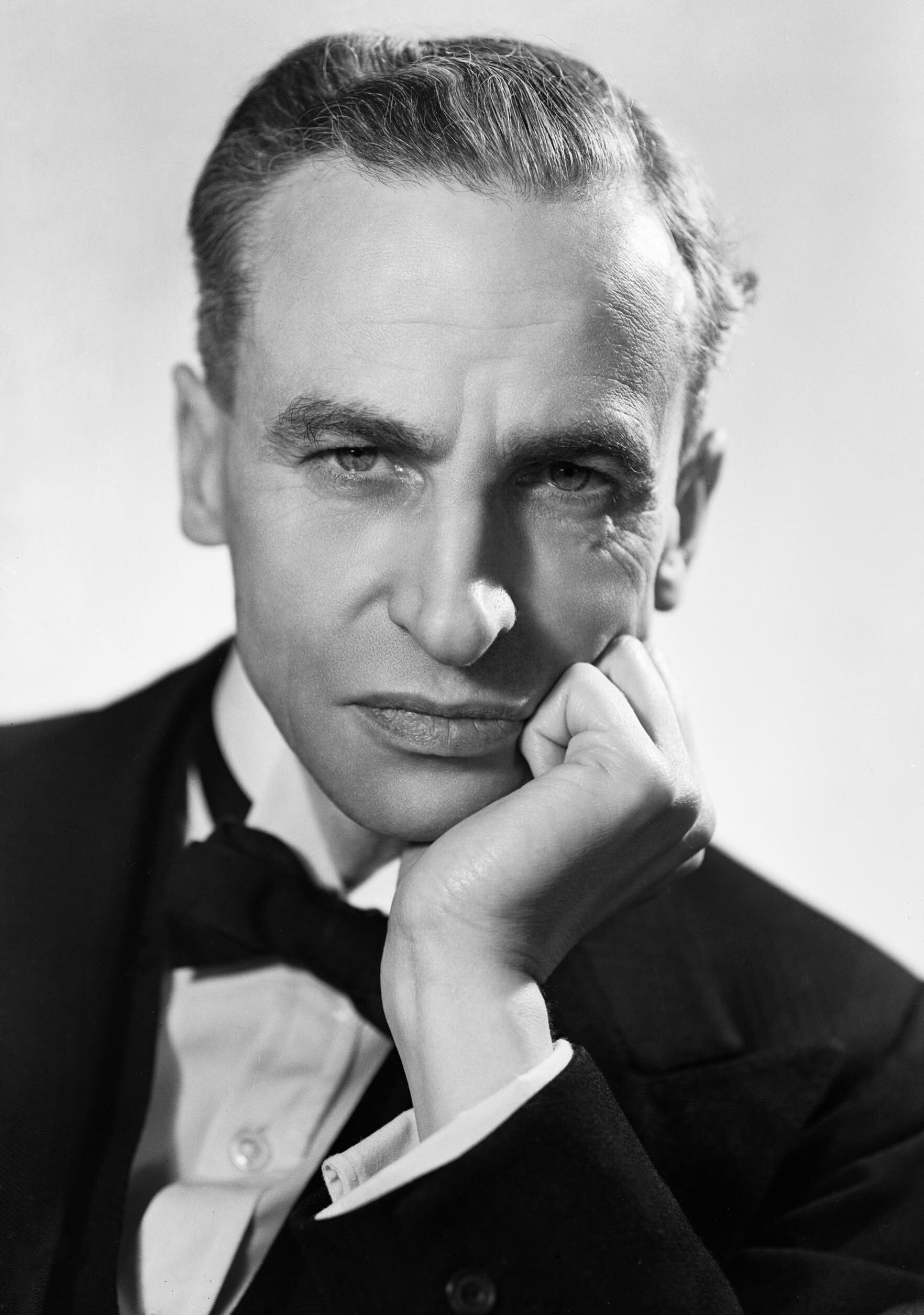

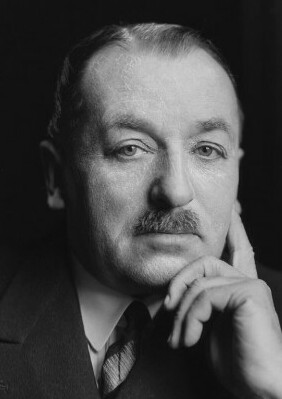
	First party	Second party
Leader	Clement Attlee	Winston Churchill
Party	Labour	Conservative
Alliance		Churchill Caretaker Ministry
Leader since	25 October 1935	9 October 1940
Leader's seat	Limehouse	Woodford
Last election	154 seats, 38.0%	387 seats, 47.8%
Seats won	393	197 (Note: Figure includes Speaker of the House of Commons Douglas Clifton Brown in Hexham.)
Seat change	▲239	▼190
Popular vote	11,967,746	9,101,099
Percentage	48.0%	36.2%
Swing	▲10.0 pp	▼11.6 pp
	Third party	Fourth party
Leader	Archibald Sinclair	Ernest Brown
Party	Liberal	Liberal National
Alliance		Churchill Caretaker Ministry
Leader since	26 November 1935	1940
Leader's seat	Caithness and Sutherland (lost seat)	Leith (lost seat)
Last election	21 seats, (Note: Combined seats for Liberal Party and Independent Liberals in 1931.) 6.7%	33 seats, 3.7%
Seats won	12	11
Seat change	▼9	▼22
Popular vote	2,252,430	737,732
Percentage	9.0%	2.9%
Swing	▲2.3 pp	▼0.8 pp
- Colours denote the winning party – as shown in § Results

- Composition of the House of Commons after the election
Prime Minister before election
Winston Churchill
Conservative
Prime Minister after election
Clement Attlee
Labour

A general election was held in the United Kingdom on Thursday 5 July 1945. (Note: Polling in some constituencies was delayed by several days, and the counting of votes was postponed until 26 July to allow time for overseas votes to arrive in Britain.) With the ongoing Second World War still fresh in the minds of voters, the opposition Labour Party led by Clement Attlee won a landslide victory with a majority of 146 seats, defeating the incumbent Conservative-led government under Prime Minister Winston Churchill. The result reflected widespread public concern about the future direction of the United Kingdom in the post-war period.

The election's campaigning was focused on leadership of the country and its postwar future. Churchill sought to use his wartime popularity as part of his campaign to keep the Conservatives in power after a wartime coalition had been in place since 1940 with the other political parties, but he faced questions from public opinion surrounding the Conservatives' actions in the 1930s and his ability to handle domestic issues unrelated to warfare. Clement Attlee, leader of the Labour Party, had been Deputy Prime Minister in the wartime coalition in 1940–1945 and was seen as a more competent leader by voters, particularly those who feared a return to the levels of unemployment in the 1930s and who sought a strong figurehead in British politics to lead the postwar rebuilding of the country. Opinion polls when the election was called showed strong approval ratings for Churchill, but Labour had held a lead in voting intention polls since 1943.

Labour won a landslide victory, gaining 239 seats for a total majority of 146 with 49.7% of the popular vote, allowing Attlee to become prime minister. The party also won two seats in a walkover, the last time any seat in the House of Commons went uncontested in a general election. (Note: Liverpool Scotland and Rhondda West.) This was Labour's first outright majority and enabled Attlee to begin implementing the party's post-war reforms. The result was a major shock for the Conservatives, who lost 189 seats despite winning 36.2% of the vote, having campaigned on the assumption that Churchill's wartime leadership would secure victory. The Liberal Party suffered a net loss of nine seats and its leader Archibald Sinclair lost his seat, while the Liberal National Party lost 22 seats, including that of its leader Ernest Brown. A total of 324 new MPs entered the House of Commons, a record that stood until 2024. Additionally, the beginning of the Attlee ministry paralleled the beginning of the Truman administration in the United States.

The 11.7% swing from the Conservatives to an opposition party is the largest since the Acts of Union 1800; the Conservative loss of the vote exceeded that of their landslide defeat in 1906. It was also the first election since 1906 in which the Conservatives did not win a plurality (relative majority) of the popular vote. Churchill remained actively involved in politics and returned as prime minister after leading his party into the 1951 general election. For the Liberal National Party the election was their last as a distinct party, as they merged with the Conservatives in 1947 (although they operated as a subsidiary party of the Conservatives until 1968) while Ernest Brown resigned from politics in the aftermath of the election.

As it was the first general election held since the German surrender in World War II, and nearly 10 years since the last general election in 14 November 1935, it was the first of three elections during the reign of George VI.

== Dissolution of Parliament and campaign ==
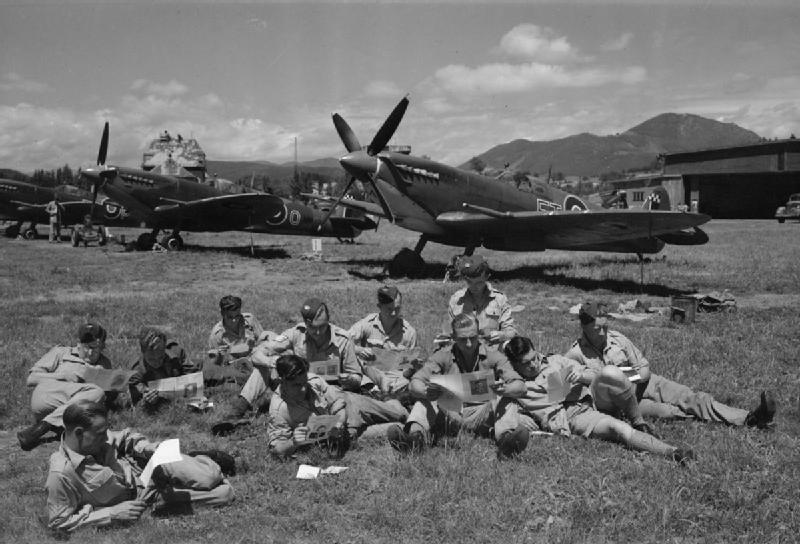
RAF mechanics in Klagenfurt, Austria study election material.

Held less than two months following VE Day, this was the first general election since 1935, as general elections had been suspended by Parliament during the Second World War. Clement Attlee, the leader of the Labour Party, refused Winston Churchill's offer of continuing the wartime coalition until the Allied defeat of Japan. On 15 June, King George VI dissolved Parliament, which had been sitting for nearly ten years without an election.

The Labour manifesto, Let Us Face the Future, included promises of nationalisation, economic planning, full employment, a National Health Service, and a system of social security. The manifesto proved popular with the electorate, selling one and a half million copies. Churchill's manifesto, Mr. Churchill's Declaration to the Voters, on the other hand, included progressive ideas on key social issues but was relatively vague on the idea of postwar economic control, and the party was associated with high levels of unemployment in the 1930s. It failed to convince voters that it could effectively deal with unemployment in a postwar Britain. In May 1945, when the war in Europe ended, Churchill's approval ratings stood at 83%, but the Labour Party had held an 18% poll lead as of February 1945.

The polls for some seats were delayed until 12 July and in Nelson and Colne until 19 July because of local wakes weeks. The results were counted and declared on 26 July to allow time to transport the votes of those serving overseas. Victory over Japan Day ensued on 15 August.

== Outcome ==
The caretaker government, led by Churchill, was heavily defeated. The Labour Party led by Attlee won a landslide victory and gained a majority of 146 seats. It was the first election in which Labour gained a majority of seats and the first in which it won a relative majority (plurality) of votes.

The election was a disaster for the Liberal Party, which lost all of its urban seats, and marked its transition from being a party of government to a party of the political fringe. Its leader, Archibald Sinclair, lost his rural seat of Caithness and Sutherland. That was the last general election until 2019 in which a major party leader lost their seat, but Sinclair lost only by six votes in a very tight three-way contest.

The Liberal National Party fared even worse by losing two-thirds of its seats and falling behind the Liberals in seat count for the first time since the parties split in 1931. It was the final election that the Liberal Nationals fought as an autonomous party, as they merged with the Conservative Party two years later although they continued to exist as a subsidiary party of the Conservatives until 1968.

Future prominent figures who entered Parliament included Harold Wilson, James Callaghan, Barbara Castle, Michael Foot and Hugh Gaitskell. Future Conservative Prime Minister Harold Macmillan lost his seat, but he returned to Parliament at a by-election later that year.

=== Reasons for Labour victory ===
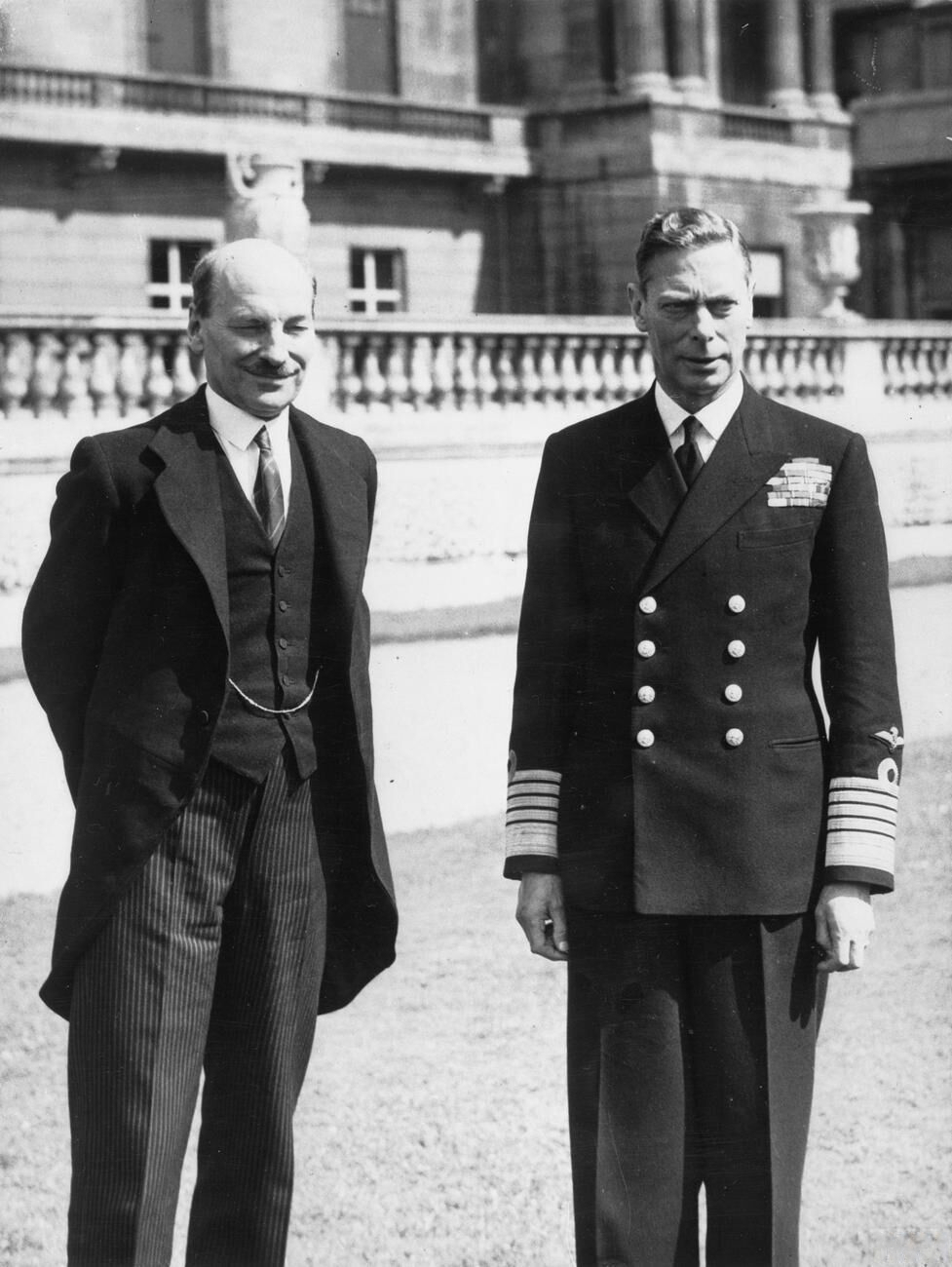
Attlee meeting King George VI following Labour's 1945 election victory

Ralph Ingersoll reported in late 1940:

Everywhere I went in London people admired [Churchill's] energy, his courage, his singleness of purpose. People said they didn't know what Britain would do without him. He was obviously respected. But no one felt he would be Prime Minister after the war. He was simply the right man in the right job at the right time. The time being the time of a desperate war with Britain's enemies.

The historian Henry Pelling, noting that polls showed a steady Labour lead after 1942, pointed to long-term forces that caused the Labour landslide: the usual swing against the party in power, the Conservative loss of initiative, wide fears of a return to the high unemployment of the 1930s, the theme that socialist planning would be more efficient in operating the economy, and the mistaken belief that Churchill would continue as prime minister regardless of the result.

==== Labour strengths ====
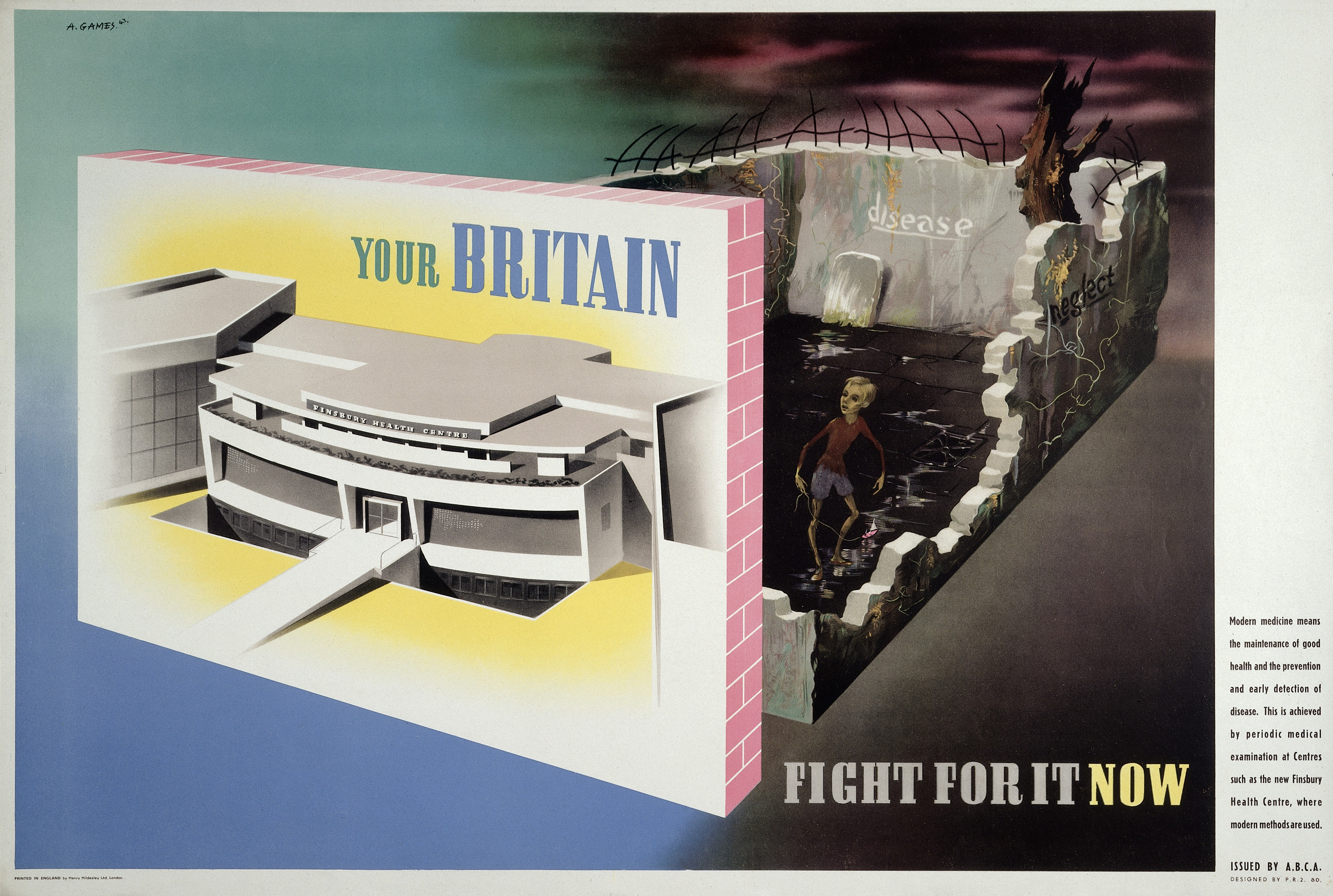
A 1943 poster by the Army Bureau of Current Affairs suggested that a British victory would lead to positive social change, like slum clearance. Churchill considered the poster "a disgraceful libel on the conditions prevailing in Great Britain before the war" and ordered it suppressed.

The greatest factor in Labour's dramatic win appeared to be its policy of social reform. In one opinion poll, 41% of respondents considered housing to be the most important issue that faced the country, 15% stated the Labour policy of full employment, 7% mentioned social security, 6% nationalisation, and just 5% international security, which was emphasised by the Conservatives.

The Beveridge Report, published in 1942, proposed the creation of a welfare state. It called for a dramatic turn in British social policy, with provision for nationalised healthcare, expansion of state-funded education, National Insurance and a new housing policy. The report was extremely popular, and copies of its findings were widely purchased, turning it into a best-seller. The Labour Party adopted the report eagerly, and the Conservatives (including Churchill, who did not regard the reforms as socialist) accepted many of the principles of the report, but argued that they were not affordable. Labour offered a new comprehensive welfare policy, reflecting a consensus that social changes were needed. The Conservatives were not willing to make the same changes that Labour proposed, and appeared out of step with public opinion.

Labour played to the concept of "winning the peace" that would follow the war. Possibly for that reason, there was especially strong support for Labour in the armed services, which feared the unemployment and homelessness to which the soldiers of the First World War had returned. It has been claimed that the left-wing bias of teachers in the armed services was a contributing factor, but that argument has generally not carried much weight, and the failure of the Conservative governments in the 1920s to deliver a "land fit for heroes" was likely more important.

Labour had also been given during the war the opportunity to display to the electorate its domestic competence in government, under men such as Attlee as Deputy Prime Minister, Herbert Morrison at the Home Office and Ernest Bevin at the Ministry of Labour. The differing wartime strategies of the two parties likewise gave Labour an advantage. Labour continued to attack prewar Conservative governments for their inactivity in tackling Hitler, reviving the economy and rearming Britain, but Churchill was less interested in furthering his party, much to the chagrin of many of its members and MPs.

==== Conservative weaknesses ====
Though voters respected and liked Churchill's wartime record, they were more distrustful of the Conservative Party's domestic and foreign policy record in the late 1930s. Churchill and the Conservatives are also generally considered to have run a poor campaign in comparison to Labour. Churchill's personal popularity remained high; hence, the Conservatives were confident of victory and based much of their election campaign on that, rather than proposing new programmes. However, people distinguished between Churchill and his party, a contrast that Labour repeatedly emphasised throughout the campaign. Voters also harboured doubts over Churchill's ability to lead the country on the domestic front. The writer and soldier Anthony Burgess remarked that Churchill, who then often wore a colonel's uniform, was not nearly as popular with soldiers at the front as with officers and civilians. Burgess noted that Churchill often smoked cigars in front of soldiers who had not had a decent cigarette in days.

In addition to the poor Conservative general election strategy, Churchill went so far as to accuse Attlee of seeking to behave as a dictator, despite Attlee's service as part of Churchill's war cabinet. In the most famous incident of the campaign, Churchill's first election broadcast on 4 June backfired dramatically and memorably. Denouncing his former coalition partners, he declared that Labour "would have to fall back on some form of a Gestapo" to impose socialism on Britain. Attlee responded the next night by ironically thanking the prime minister for demonstrating to the people the difference between "Churchill the great wartime leader" and "Churchill the peacetime politician" and argued the case for public control of industry.

Another blow to the Conservative campaign was the memory of the 1930s policy of appeasement, conducted by Churchill's Conservative predecessors, Neville Chamberlain and Stanley Baldwin, that had been widely discredited for allowing Adolf Hitler's Germany to become too powerful. Labour had strongly advocated appeasement until 1938, but the interwar period had been dominated by Conservatives. With the exception of two brief minority Labour governments in 1924 and 1929–1931, the Conservatives had been in power for all of the interwar period. As a result, the Conservatives were generally blamed for the era's mistakes: appeasement, inflation and the unemployment of the Great Depression. Many voters felt that although the First World War had been won, the peace that followed had been lost.

== Results ==
=== Summary of seats returned ===
Party	Leader	MPs		Aggregate votes	
Party	Leader		Of total		Of total (Note: Adjusted for multi-member constituencies.)
Labour Party	Clement Attlee	393 (Note: Includes 23 Co-operative Party MPs, as part of the Labour-Co-op alliance.)	61.4%	11,967,746	48.0%
Conservative and Unionist Party	Winston Churchill	197	30.8%	9,101,099	36.2%
Conservative Party (Note: Results for England and Wales.)	Winston Churchill	163	25.5%	7,829,082	31.6%
Unionist Party	John Craik-Henderson	25	3.9%	879,567	3.5%
Ulster Unionist Party	Basil Brooke	9	1.4%	392,450	1.1%
Liberal Party	Archibald Sinclair	12	1.9%	2,252,430	9.0%
Liberal National Party	Ernest Brown	11	1.7%	737,732	2.9%
Independent	—N/a	8	1.3%	132,339	0.5%
Independent Labour Party	Bob Edwards	3	0.5%	46,679	0.2%
Nationalist Party	James McSparran	2	0.3%	148,078	0.4%
National	—N/a	2	0.3%	133,179	0.5%
Communist Party of Great Britain	Harry Pollitt	2	0.3%	102,780	0.4%
Independent Unionist	—N/a	2	0.3%	82,542	0.3%
Independent Labour	—N/a	2	0.3%	63,135	0.3%
National Independent	—N/a	2	0.3%	61,749	0.3%
Independent Liberal	—N/a	2	0.3%	30,450	0.1%
Common Wealth Party	Charles Andrew Smith	1	0.2%	110,634	0.4%
Independent Progressive	—N/a	1	0.2%	35,071	0.1%

=== Full results ===
Below is a table summarising the constituency results of the 1945 general election in England, excluding the result in the university constituencies. The seat count and vote share comparisons for the Churchill Caretaker Ministry coalition are compared with the National Government coalition which had effectively dissolved in 1940.

Results of the July 1945 general election to the House of Commons of the United Kingdom
Party	Leader	Candidates	MPs					Aggregate votes		
Party	Leader	Candidates	Total	Gains	Losses	Net	Of total (%)	Total	Of total (%) (Note: Adjusted for multi-member constituencies.)	Change (%)
Labour	Clement; Attlee	603 (Note: Includes 34 Co-operative Party candidates, as part of the Labour-Co-op alliance.)	393 (Note: Includes 23 Co-operative Party MPs, as part of the Labour-Co-op alliance.)	242 (Note: Includes 14 Co-operative Party MPs, as part of the Labour-Co-op alliance.)	3	▲239	61.4 (Note: Includes 3.6% for the Co-operative Party, as part of the Labour-Co-op alliance.)	11,967,746 (Note: Includes 635,335 for the Co-operative Party, as part of the Labour-Co-op alliance.)	48.0 (Note: Includes 2.6% for the Co-operative Party, as part of the Labour-Co-op alliance.)	▲10.0 (Note: Includes ▲0.9% for the Co-operative Party, as part of the Labour-Co-op alliance.)
Churchill Caretaker Ministry (Total)	Winston; Churchill	618	210	16	235	▼219	32.8	9,972,010	39.6	▼13.7
Conservative (Note: Figure includes the Unionist Party and the Ulster Unionist Party under their nation affiliations with the Conservative Party.)	Winston; Churchill	559	197	14	204	▼190	30.8	9,101,099	36.2	▼11.6
Liberal; National	Ernest; Brown	49	11	0	22	▼22	1.7	737,732	2.9	▼0.8
National	—N/a	10	2 (Note: Andrew Duncan in City of London and John Anderson in Combined Scottish Universities.)	2 (Note: Andrew Duncan in City of London and John Anderson in Combined Scottish Universities.)	1 (Note: Ivor Guest in Brecon and Radnorshire.)	▲1	0.3	133,179	0.5	▲0.2
National; Labour	—N/a	0	0	Dissolved		▼8	—	0	0.0	▼1.5
Liberal	Archibald; Sinclair	306	12	5	14	▼9	1.9	2,252,430	9.0	▲2.3
Nationalist	James; McSparran	3	2	0	0	Steady	0.3	148,078	0.4	▲0.1
Independent	—N/a	36	8	6	0	▲6	—	132,340	0.5	▲0.5
Common Wealth	C. A. Smith	23	1 (Note: Vernon Bartlett in Chelmsford.)	New		▲1	—	110,634	0.4	New
Communist	Harry; Pollitt	21	2 (Note: Phil Piratin in Mile End and Willie Gallacher in West Fife.)	1 (Note: Phil Piratin in Mile End.)	0	▲1	0.3	102,780	0.4	▲0.3
Independent; Unionist	—N/a	3	2 (Note: John Mackie in Galloway and James Little in Down.)	Did not stand in 1935		▲2	—	82,542	0.3	—N/a
Independent; Labour	—N/a	7	2	2 (Note: Denis Pritt in Hammersmith North and Jack Beattie in Belfast West.)	0	▲2	—	63,135	0.3	▲0.2
National; Independent	—N/a	11	2 (Note: Ernest Graham-Little in London University and Daniel Lipson in Cheltenham.)	1 (Note: Daniel Lipson in Cheltenham.)	1 (Note: Austin Hopkinson in Mossley.)	Steady	—	61,749	0.3	▲0.1
Ind. Labour Party	Bob; Edwards	5	3	0	1 (Note: George Buchanan re-elected in Glasgow Gorbals but as official Labour candidate.)	▼1	0.5	46,679	0.2	▼0.5
Independent; Progressive	—N/a	7	1	1 (Note: Ernest Millington in Bridgwater.)	0	▲1	0.2	35,071	0.1	▲0.1
SNP	Douglas; Young	8	0	0	0	Steady	—	30,595	0.1	Steady
Independent; Liberal	—N/a	3	2	2 (Note: John MacLeod in Ross and Cromarty and Murdoch Macdonald in Inverness.)	0	▲2	—	30,450	0.1	▲0.1
Plaid Cymru	Saunders; Lewis	7	0	0	0	Steady	—	16,017	0.1	▲0.1
Commonwealth Labour Party	Harry; Midgley	1	0	New			—	14,096	0.1	New
Independent; Conservative	—N/a	3	0	0	0	Steady	—	9,729	0.0	▼0.1
Independent; National	—N/a	4	0	Did not stand in 1935			—	5,430	0.0	—N/a
Liverpool; Protestant	Harry Dixon Longbottom	1	0	0	0	Steady	—	2,601	0.0	Steady
Protestant; Action	John Cormack	1	0	New			—	2,493	0.0	New
Christian; Pacifist	—N/a	1	0	Did not stand in 1935			—	2,381	0.0	—N/a
Agriculturalist	—N/a	2	0	Did not stand in 1935			—	2,057	0.0	—N/a
Democratic	Norman Leith-Hay-Clark	5	0	New			—	1,809	0.0	New
Medical	—N/a	1	0	New			—	1,249	0.0	New
Socialist (GB)	Collective; Leadership	1	0	New			—	472	0.0	New
United Socialist	Guy; Aldred	1	0	New			—	300	0.0	New
Independent Scoittish Nationalist	—N/a	1	0	New			—	232	0.0	New
Total		1,683	640	25 (Note: The number of seats in England was increased from 492 to 517 for this election.)		▲25	100.0	25,095,195	100.0	0.0
Registered voters, and turnout								33,672,036 (Note: Including the electorate in uncontested constituencies.)	72.8 (Note: Adjusted for multi-member constituencies.)	▲1.7

=== Popular vote ===
Popular vote
Labour	48.0%
Conservative	36.2%
Liberal	9.0%
Liberal National	2.9%
Others	3.9%

Popular vote (coalitions)
Labour	48.0%
Caretaker Gov.	39.6%
Liberal	9.0%
Others	3.4%

=== Parliament seats ===
Parliament seats
Labour	61.4%
Conservative	30.8%
Liberal	1.9%
Liberal National	1.7%
Others	4.2%

Parliament seats (coalitions)
Labour	61.4%
Caretaker Gov.	32.8%
Liberal	1.9%
Others	3.9%

== Transfers of seats ==
All comparisons are with the winning party in the 1935 election; the aim is to provide a comparison with the previous general election. This list includes seats where the incumbent was standing down and therefore there was no possibility of a particular person being defeated.

- In some cases the sitting MP had changed to the gaining party. Such circumstances are marked with a *.
- In other circumstances the gaining party had won a by-election in the intervening years, and then retained the seat in 1945. Such circumstances are marked with a †.

To	From	No.	Seats
Communist	Labour	1	Mile End
Labour	Ind. Labour Party	1	Gorbals*
Labour	National Labour	8	Kilmarnock, Derby (one of two)†, Ormskirk, Leicester West, Nottingham South, Lichfield†, Leeds Central, Cardiff C
Labour	Liberal	9	Dundee (one of two), Paisley, Birkenhead East, Bristol North, (Note: Candidate had defected to Liberal National Party.) Bethnal Green South-West, Wolverhampton East, Middlesbrough West, Bradford South, Carnarvonshire
Labour	National Independent	1	Mossley
Labour	National	1	Brecon and Radnor†
Labour	Conservative	186	Dundee (one of two), Kelvingrove, Dunbartonshire†, Lanark, Lanarkshire N, Renfrewshire W, Rutherglen, Edinburgh North, Edinburgh Central, Midlothian S & Peebles, Berwick and Haddington, Bedford, Reading, Buckingham, Wycombe, Cambridge, Cambridgeshire, Birkenhead West, Crewe, Stalybridge and Hyde, Southampton (one of two), Penryn and Falmouth, Carlisle, Derby (one of two), Belper, Derbyshire South, Derbyshire West, (Note: Seat had been won by an Independent Labour candidate in a by-election, who fought and won the 1945 election as a Labour candidate.) Sutton, Darlington, Stockton-on-Tees, Sunderland (one of two), The Hartlepools, Leyton East, Colchester, East Ham N, Epping, Essex SE, Ilford N (from Ilford), Maldon, (Note: Seat had been won by an independent candidate in a by-election, who fought and won the 1945 election as a Labour candidate.) Walthamstow E, Bristol Central, Gloucester, Stroud, Thornbury, Portsmouth Central, Portsmouth North, Winchester, Dudley, Kidderminster, Stourbridge, Hitchin, St Albans, Watford, Kingston upon Hull North West, Kingston upon Hull South West, Chatham, Chislehurst, Dartford†, Dover, Faversham, Gillingham, Gravesend, Accrington, Barrow-in-Furness, Blackburn (both seats), Chorley, Clitheroe, Preston (both seats), Rossendale, Bolton (both seats), Eccles, Heywood and Radcliffe, Blackley, Manchester Exchange, Hulme, Moss Side, Rusholme, Oldham (one of two), Salford North, Salford South, Salford West, Stretford, Bootle, Edge Hill, Liverpool Exchange, Fairfield, Kirkdale, Walton, Warrington, Widnes, Harborough, Leicester East, Leicester South, Loughborough, Grimsby, Lincoln, Balham and Tooting, Battersea South, Brixton, Camberwell North West, Clapham, Dulwich, Fulham East, Greenwich, Hackney North, Hammersmith South, Islington East, Kensington North, Lewisham East, Lewisham West, Norwood, Paddington North, Fulham West†, Islington North†, Kennington†, Peckham†, St Pancras North, St Pancras South East, St Pancras South West, Stoke Newington, Wandsworth Central†, Woolwich West, Ealing West, Enfield, Harrow East, Spelthorne, Uxbridge, Willesden East, King's Lynn, Norfolk North, Norfolk South, Norfolk South West, Norwich (one of two), Kettering, Northampton, Peterborough, Wellingborough, Newcastle upon Tyne Central, Newcastle upon Tyne West, Tynemouth, Wallsend, Wansbeck, Nottingham Central, Nottingham East, Rushcliffe, The Wrekin, Frome, Taunton, Burton, Smethwick, Stafford, Bilston, Wolverhampton West, Ipswich†, Lowestoft, Sudbury, Croydon South, Mitcham, Wimbledon, Duddeston, Coventry East (replaced Coventry), Aston, Deritend, Erdington, King's Norton, Ladywood, Yardley, Sparkbrook, Birmingham West, Swindon, York, Cleveland, Leeds North East, Sheffield Central, Bradford North, Sowerby, Elland, Leeds West, Halifax, Bradford East, Newport, Llandaff and Barry, Cardiff E, (Note: Seat had been won by an independent candidate in a by-election.) Cardiff S
Labour	Liberal National	17	Greenock†, Leith, Luton, Devonport, (Note: Candidate had moved to 'National' label.) Gateshead, Sunderland (one of two), Southampton (one of two), Oldham (one of two), Bosworth, Southwark North†, Great Yarmouth, Norwich (one of two), Newcastle upon Tyne East, Walsall, Huddersfield, Spen Valley, Swansea West
Labour	New seats	14	Eton and Slough, Ilford South, Barking, Dagenham, Hornchurch, Thurrock, Barnet, Hendon North, Southall, Wembley North, Wembley South, Bexley, Acock's Green, Coventry West
Independent Labour	Labour	1	Hammersmith North*
Independent Labour	UUP	1	Belfast West
Common Wealth	Conservative	1	Chelmsford*
Liberal	Labour	1	Carmarthen
Liberal	Conservative	2	Dorset North, Buckrose
Liberal	Liberal National	2	Eye*, Montgomeryshire*
Independent Progressive	Conservative	1	Bridgwater†
Independent	Conservative	5	Grantham†, Rugby†, Cambridge University (one of two), Combined English Universities (one of two), Oxford University (one of two)
National Independent	Conservative	1	Cheltenham (Note: Seat had been won by Independent Conservative candidate in a by-election, who fought and won the 1945 election as a National Independent candidate.)
Conservative	Liberal	5	Caithness and Sutherland, Isle of Ely, Barnstaple, (Note: Candidate had defected to the Common Wealth party.) Berwick-upon-Tweed, Carnarvon
Conservative	Speaker	1	Daventry†
Conservative	New seats	8	Bucklow, Woodford, Orpington, Blackpool North, Carshalton, Sutton and Cheam, Worthing, Solihull
Ind. Unionist	Conservative	1	Galloway*
Independent Liberal	Liberal National	2	Ross and Cromarty, (Note: Seat had been won by National Labour in a by-election.) Inverness
Ind. Unionist	UUP	1	Down (one of two)*
Speaker	Conservative	1	Hexham*
National	Conservative	2	City of London (one of two)†, Combined Scottish Universities (one of three)
Independent	National Liberal	1	Combined Scottish Universities (one of three)

== MPs who lost their seats ==
=== Conservative ===
- Nigel Colman (Brixton)
- Harold Macmillan (Stockton-on-Tees)

=== Liberal ===
- Percy Harris (Bethnal Green South West)

== Opinion polls ==
Polls showed a lead for Labour since 1943, except for one poll in June 1945 when both Labour and the Conservatives tied on 45%.

== See also ==
- List of MPs elected in the 1945 United Kingdom general election
- 1945 United Kingdom general election in England
- 1945 United Kingdom general election in Scotland
- 1945 United Kingdom general election in Wales
- 1945 United Kingdom general election in Northern Ireland
- 1945 Prime Minister's Resignation Honours
- Attlee ministry
