= Newington West =

Parliamentary constituency in the United Kingdom, 1885–1918

- Former borough constituency for the House of Commons
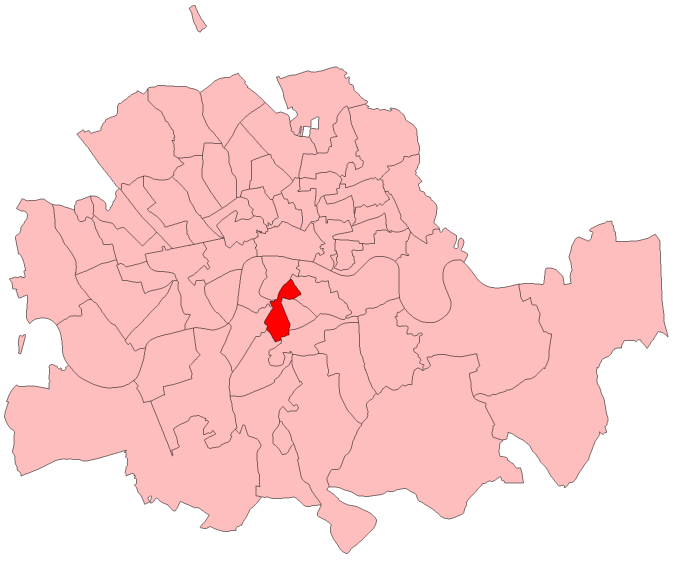
- Newington West in London

1885–1918
- Seats: one
- Created from: Lambeth (part of)
- Replaced by: Southwark Central

Newington West was a parliamentary constituency in the Newington area of South London. It returned one Member of Parliament (MP) to the House of Commons of the Parliament of the United Kingdom, elected by the first past the post system.

== History ==
The constituency was created by the Redistribution of Seats Act 1885 for the 1885 general election. It was abolished for the 1918 general election, although the new constituency of Southwark Central had very similar boundaries.

== Boundaries ==
Part of St Mary's ward and Trinity and St Paul's ward.

== Members of Parliament ==
Election	Member	Party
1885	Charles Cooke	Conservative
1892	Cecil Norton	Liberal
1916	James Daniel Gilbert	Liberal
1918	constituency abolished	

== Election results ==
Decades:	1880s; 1890s; 1900s; 1910s

=== Elections in the 1880s ===
General election 1885: Newington West
Party	Candidate	Votes	%	±%
Conservative	Charles Cooke	2,419	48.2	
Liberal	John Seymour Keay	1,774	35.4	
Independent Liberal	William McArthur	821	16.4	
Majority		645	12.8	
Turnout		5,014	78.6	
Registered electors		6,377		
Conservative win (new seat)				

Firth

General election 1886: Newington West
Party	Candidate	Votes	%	±%
Conservative	Charles Cooke	2,447	54.2	+6.0
Liberal	Joseph Bottomley Firth	2,065	45.8	+10.4
Majority		382	8.4	−4.4
Turnout		4,502	70.8	−7.8
Registered electors		6,377		
Conservative hold		Swing	-2.2	

=== Elections in the 1890s ===
Norton

General election 1892: Newington West
Party	Candidate	Votes	%	±%
Liberal	Cecil Norton	3,421	59.5	+13.7
Conservative	George Tallents	2,328	40.5	−13.7
Majority		1,093	19.0	N/A
Turnout		5,749	75.9	+5.1
Registered electors		7,579		
Liberal gain from Conservative		Swing	+13.7	

General election 1895: Newington West
Party	Candidate	Votes	%	±%
Liberal	Cecil Norton	3,219	53.8	−5.7
Conservative	George Tallents	2,769	46.2	+5.7
Majority		450	7.6	−11.4
Turnout		5,978	75.1	−0.8
Registered electors		7,971		
Liberal hold		Swing	-5.7	

=== Elections in the 1900s ===
General election 1900: Newington West
Party	Candidate	Votes	%	±%
Liberal	Cecil Norton	3,559	59.7	+5.9
Conservative	Francis Ricarde-Seaver	2,403	40.3	−5.9
Majority		1,156	19.4	+11.8
Turnout		5,962	70.2	−4.9
Registered electors		8,491		
Liberal hold		Swing	+5.9	

General election 1906: Newington West
Party	Candidate	Votes	%	±%
Liberal	Cecil Norton	4,446	64.7	+5.0
Conservative	Ralph Emanuel Belilios	2,425	35.3	−5.0
Majority		2,021	29.4	+10.0
Turnout		6,871	76.4	+6.2
Registered electors		8,995		
Liberal hold		Swing	+5.0	

=== Elections in the 1910s ===
General election January 1910: Newington West
Party	Candidate	Votes	%	±%
Liberal	Cecil Norton	4,350	52.5	−12.2
Conservative	Warwick Brookes	3,938	47.5	+12.2
Majority		412	5.0	−24.4
Turnout		8,288	86.0	+9.6
Liberal hold		Swing	-12.2	

General election December 1910: Newington West
Party	Candidate	Votes	%	±%
Liberal	Cecil Norton	4,038	53.6	+1.1
Conservative	Warwick Brookes	3,498	46.4	−1.1
Majority		540	7.2	+2.2
Turnout		7,536	78.2	−7.8
Liberal hold		Swing	+1.1	

General Election 1914–15:

Another General Election was required to take place before the end of 1915. The political parties had been making preparations for an election to take place and by July 1914, the following candidates had been selected;

- Liberal:Cecil Norton
- Unionist:

1916 Newington West by-election
Party	Candidate	Votes	%	±%
Liberal	James Daniel Gilbert	2,646	77.1	+23.5
Independent Labour	Joseph J Terrett	787	22.9	New
Majority		1,859	54.2	+47.0
Turnout		3,433	35.0	−43.2
Liberal hold		Swing		

== Notes and references ==
- Debrett’s Illustrated Heraldic and Biographical House of Commons and the Judicial Bench 1886
- Debrett’s House of Commons and the Judicial Bench 1901
- Debrett’s House of Commons and the Judicial Bench 1918
