= Roy Jenkins =

British politician (1920–2003)

The Right Honourable The Lord Jenkins of Hillhead OM PC
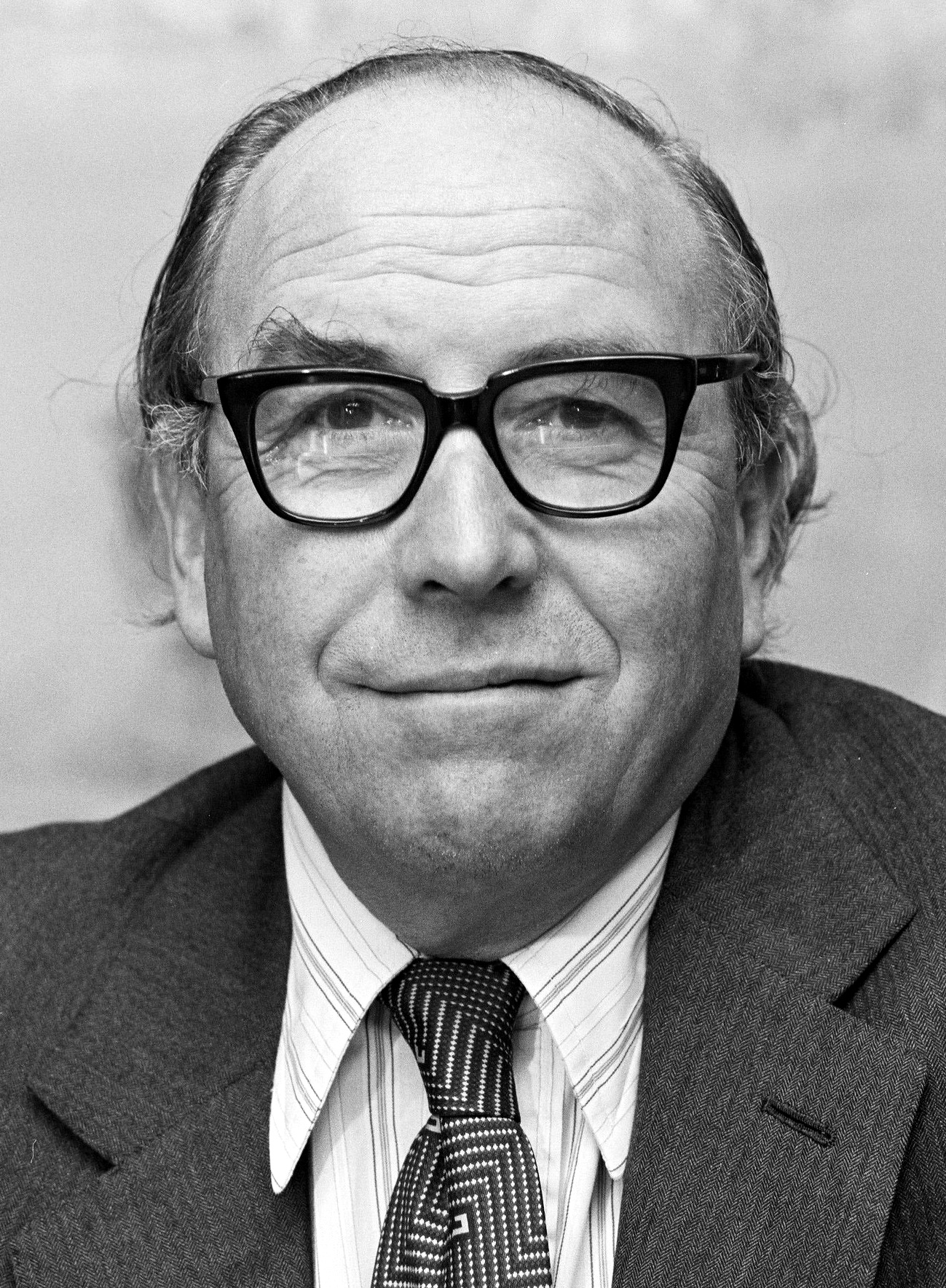
- Jenkins in 1977

Chancellor of the University of Oxford
- In office 14 March 1987 – 5 January 2003
- Vice‑Chancellor: The Lord Neill of Bladen; Sir Richard Southwood; Sir Peter North; Sir Colin Lucas
- Preceded by: Harold Macmillan
- Succeeded by: Chris Patten

President of the European Commission
- In office 6 January 1977 – 19 January 1981
- Preceded by: François-Xavier Ortoli
- Succeeded by: Gaston Thorn

Home Secretary
- In office 4 March 1974 – 10 September 1976
- Prime Minister: Harold Wilson; James Callaghan
- Preceded by: Robert Carr
- Succeeded by: Merlyn Rees
- In office 23 December 1965 – 30 November 1967
- Prime Minister: Harold Wilson
- Preceded by: Frank Soskice
- Succeeded by: James Callaghan

Chancellor of the Exchequer
- In office 30 November 1967 – 19 June 1970
- Prime Minister: Harold Wilson
- Chief Secretary: Jack Diamond
- Preceded by: James Callaghan
- Succeeded by: Iain Macleod
Junior ministerial offices
Minister of Aviation
In office 18 October 1964 – 23 December 1965
Prime Minister	Harold Wilson
Preceded by	Julian Amery
Succeeded by	Fred Mulley
Party political offices
Leader of the Liberal Democrats in the House of Lords
In office 16 July 1988 – 19 December 1997
Leader	Paddy Ashdown
Preceded by	The Baroness Seear
Succeeded by	The Lord Rodgers of Quarry Bank
Leader of the Social Democratic Party
In office 7 July 1982 – 13 June 1983
President	Shirley Williams
Deputy	David Owen
Preceded by	Party established
Succeeded by	David Owen
Deputy Leader of the Labour Party
In office 8 July 1970 – 10 April 1972
Leader	Harold Wilson
Preceded by	George Brown
Succeeded by	Edward Short
Shadow Cabinet offices
Shadow Home Secretary
In office 25 November 1973 – 4 March 1974
Leader	Harold Wilson
Preceded by	Shirley Williams
Succeeded by	Jim Prior
Shadow Chancellor of the Exchequer
In office 20 June 1970 – 19 April 1972
Leader	Harold Wilson
Preceded by	Iain Macleod
Succeeded by	Denis Healey
Parliamentary offices
Member of the House of Lords
Lord Temporal
Life peerage 20 November 1987 – 5 January 2003
Member of Parliament for Glasgow Hillhead
In office 25 March 1982 – 18 May 1987
Preceded by	Tam Galbraith
Succeeded by	George Galloway
Member of Parliament for Birmingham Stechford
In office 23 February 1950 – 5 January 1977
Preceded by	Constituency established
Succeeded by	Andrew MacKay
Member of Parliament for Southwark Central
In office 29 April 1948 – 3 February 1950
Preceded by	John Martin
Succeeded by	Constituency abolished

Personal details
- Born: Roy Harris Jenkins; 11 November 1920 Abersychan, Monmouthshire, Wales
- Died: 5 January 2003 (aged 82) East Hendred, Oxfordshire, England
- Party: Labour (until 1981); SDP (1981–1988); Liberal Democrats (from 1988)
- Spouse: Mary Jennifer Morris (m. 1945)
- Children: 3
- Parent: Arthur Jenkins (father)
- Education: Cardiff University; Balliol College, Oxford

Military service
- Allegiance: United Kingdom
- Branch/service: British Army
- Rank: Captain
- Unit: Royal Artillery
- Battles/wars: World War II

Roy Harris Jenkins, Baron Jenkins of Hillhead (11 November 1920 – 5 January 2003) was a British statesman and writer who served as President of the European Commission from 1977 to 1981. At various times a Member of Parliament (MP) for the Labour Party and the Social Democratic Party (SDP), and a peer for the Liberal Democrats, he was Chancellor of the Exchequer and Home Secretary under the Wilson and Callaghan governments.

The son of Arthur Jenkins, a coal-miner and Labour MP, Jenkins was educated at the University of Oxford and served as an intelligence officer during the Second World War. Initially elected as MP for Southwark Central in 1948, he moved to become MP for Birmingham Stechford in 1950. On the election of Harold Wilson after the 1964 election, Jenkins was appointed Minister of Aviation. A year later, he was promoted to the Cabinet to become Home Secretary. In this role, Jenkins embarked on a major reform programme; he sought to build what he described as "a civilised society", overseeing measures such as the effective abolition in Britain of both capital punishment and theatre censorship, the partial decriminalisation of homosexuality, relaxing of divorce law, suspension of birching and the liberalisation of abortion law.

Following the devaluation crisis in November 1967, Jenkins replaced James Callaghan as Chancellor of the Exchequer. Throughout his time at the Treasury, Jenkins oversaw a tight fiscal policy in an attempt to control inflation, and oversaw a particularly tough Budget in 1968 which saw major tax rises. As a result of this, the Government's current account entered a surplus in 1969. After Labour unexpectedly lost the 1970 election, Jenkins was elected as Deputy Leader of the Labour Party in 1970. He resigned from the position in 1972 after the Labour Party decided to oppose Britain's entry to the European Communities, which he strongly supported. When Labour returned to power following the 1974 election, Wilson appointed Jenkins as Home Secretary for the second time. Two years later, when Wilson resigned as prime minister, Jenkins stood in the leadership election to succeed him, finishing third behind Michael Foot and the winner James Callaghan. He subsequently chose to resign from Parliament and leave British politics, to accept appointment as the first-ever (and so far, only) British President of the European Commission, a role he took up in January 1977.

After completing his term at the Commission in 1981, Jenkins announced a surprise return to British politics; dismayed with the Labour Party's move further left under the leadership of Michael Foot, he became one of the "Gang of Four", senior, moderate Labour figures who broke away from the party and founded the SDP. In 1982, Jenkins won a by-election to return to Parliament as MP for Glasgow Hillhead, taking the seat from the Conservatives in a famous result. He became leader of the SDP ahead of the 1983 election, during which he formed an electoral alliance with the Liberal Party. Following his disappointment with the performance of the SDP in the election, he resigned as leader. He subsequently lost his seat in Parliament at the 1987 election to Labour's George Galloway, and accepted a life peerage shortly afterwards; he sat in the House of Lords as a Liberal Democrat.

Jenkins was later elected to succeed former prime minister Harold Macmillan as Chancellor of the University of Oxford following the latter's death; he would hold this position until his own death sixteen years later. In the late 1990s, he served as a close adviser to Prime Minister Tony Blair and chaired a major commission on electoral reform. In addition to his political career, he was also a noted historian, biographer, and writer. David Marquand described Jenkins's autobiography, A Life at the Centre (1991), as one which "will be read with pleasure long after most examples of the genre have been forgotten".

== Early life (1920–1945) ==
Born in Abersychan, Monmouthshire, in southeastern Wales, as an only child, Roy Jenkins was the son of a National Union of Mineworkers official, Arthur Jenkins. His father was imprisoned during the 1926 General Strike for his alleged involvement in disturbances. Arthur Jenkins later became President of the South Wales Miners' Federation and Member of Parliament for Pontypool, Parliamentary Private Secretary to Clement Attlee, and briefly a minister in the 1945 Labour government. Roy Jenkins' mother, Hattie Harris, was the daughter of a steelworks foreman.

Jenkins was educated at Pentwyn Primary School, Abersychan County Grammar School, University College, Cardiff, and at Balliol College, Oxford, where he was twice defeated for the Presidency of the Oxford Union, but took a first-class degree in Politics, Philosophy and Economics (PPE). His university colleagues included Tony Crosland, Denis Healey and Edward Heath, and he became friends with all three, although he was never particularly close to Healey.

In John Campbell's biography, A Well-Rounded Life, a romantic relationship between Jenkins and Crosland was detailed. Other figures whom he met at Oxford who would become notable in public life included Madron Seligman, Nicholas Henderson and Mark Bonham Carter.

During the Second World War, Jenkins received his officer training at Alton Towers and was posted to the 55th West Somerset Yeomanry at West Lavington, Wiltshire. Through the influence of his father, in April 1944, Jenkins was sent to Bletchley Park to work as a codebreaker; while there he befriended the historian Asa Briggs.

== Early political career (1945–1965) ==
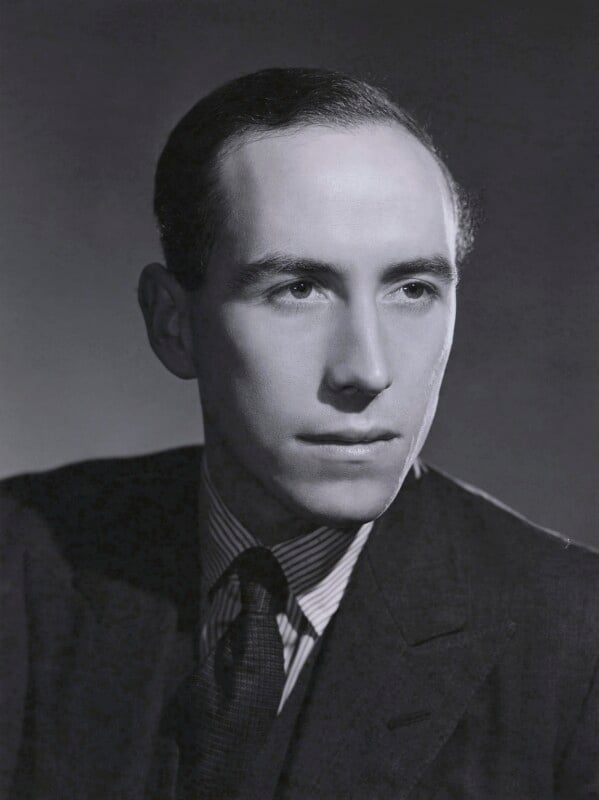
Jenkins in 1950

Having failed to win Solihull in 1945, after which he spent a brief period working for the Industrial and Commercial Finance Corporation, he was elected to the House of Commons in a 1948 by-election as the Member of Parliament for Southwark Central, becoming the "Baby of the House". His constituency was abolished in boundary changes for the 1950 general election, when he stood instead in the new Birmingham Stechford constituency. He won the seat, and represented the constituency until 1977.

In 1947, he edited a collection of Clement Attlee's speeches, published under the title Purpose and Policy. Attlee then granted Jenkins access to his private papers so that he could write his biography, which appeared in 1948 (Mr Attlee: An Interim Biography). The reviews were generally favourable, including George Orwell's in Tribune.

In 1950, he advocated a large capital levy, abolition of public schools and introduction of a measure of industrial democracy to nationalised industries as key policy objectives for the Labour government. In 1951 Tribune published his pamphlet Fair Shares for the Rich. Here, Jenkins advocated the abolition of large private incomes by taxing them, graduating from 50 per cent for incomes between £20,000 and £30,000 to 95 per cent for incomes over £100,000. He also proposed further nationalisations and said: "Future nationalisations will be more concerned with equality than with planning, and this means that we can leave the monolithic public corporation behind us and look for more intimate forms of ownership and control". He later described this "almost Robespierrean" pamphlet as "the apogee of my excursion to the left".

Jenkins contributed an essay on 'Equality' to the 1952 collection New Fabian Essays. In 1953 appeared Pursuit of Progress, a work intended to counter Bevanism. Retreating from what he had demanded in Fair Shares for the Rich, Jenkins now argued that the redistribution of wealth would occur over a generation and abandoned the goal of public school abolition. However, he still proposed further nationalisations: "It is quite impossible to advocate both the abolition of great inequalities of wealth and the acceptance of a one-quarter public sector and three-quarters private sector arrangement. A mixed economy there will undoubtedly be, certainly for many decades and perhaps permanently, but it will need to be mixed in very different proportions from this". He also opposed the Bevanites' neutralist foreign policy platform: "Neutrality is essentially a conservative policy, a policy of defeat, of announcing to the world that we have nothing to say to which the world will listen. ... Neutrality could never be acceptable to anyone who believes that he has a universal faith to preach". Jenkins argued that the Labour leadership needed to take on and defeat the neutralists and pacifists in the party; it would be better to risk a split in the party than face "the destruction, by schism, perhaps for a generation, of the whole progressive movement in the country".

Between 1951 and 1956, he wrote a weekly column for the Indian newspaper The Current. Here he advocated progressive reforms such as equal pay, the decriminalisation of homosexuality, the liberalisation of the obscenity laws and the abolition of capital punishment. Mr Balfour's Poodle, a short account of the House of Lords crisis of 1911 that culminated in the Parliament Act 1911, was published in 1954. Favourable reviewers included A. J. P. Taylor, Harold Nicolson, Leonard Woolf and Violet Bonham Carter. After a suggestion by Mark Bonham Carter, Jenkins then wrote a biography of the Victorian radical, Sir Charles Dilke, which was published in October 1958. Between 1955 and 1958 Jenkins served on the Board of Governors of the British Film Institute.

During the 1956 Suez Crisis, Jenkins denounced Anthony Eden's "squalid imperialist adventure" at a Labour rally in Birmingham Town Hall. Three years later he claimed that "Suez was a totally unsuccessful attempt to achieve unreasonable and undesirable objectives by methods which were at once reckless and immoral; and the consequences, as was well deserved, were humiliating and disastrous".

Jenkins praised Anthony Crosland's 1956 work The Future of Socialism as "the most important book on socialist theory" since Evan Durbin's The Politics of Democratic Socialism (1940). With much of the economy now nationalised, Jenkins argued, socialists should concentrate on eliminating the remaining pockets of poverty and on the removal of class barriers, as well as promoting libertarian social reforms. Jenkins was principal sponsor, in 1959, of the bill which became the liberalising Obscene Publications Act, responsible for establishing the "liable to deprave and corrupt" criterion as a basis for a prosecution of suspect material and for specifying literary merit as a possible defence.

In July 1959, Penguin published Jenkins' The Labour Case, timed to anticipate the upcoming election. Jenkins argued that Britain's chief danger was that of "living sullenly in the past, of believing that the world has a duty to keep us in the station to which we are accustomed, and showing bitter resentment if it does not do so". He added: "Our neighbours in Europe are roughly our economic and military equals. We would do better to live gracefully with them than to waste our substance by trying unsuccessfully to keep up with the power giants of the modern world". Jenkins claimed that the Attlee government concentrated "too much towards the austerity of fair shares, and too little towards the incentives of free consumers' choice". Although he still believed in the elimination of poverty and more equality, Jenkins now argued that these aims could be achieved by economic growth. In the final chapter ('Is Britain Civilised?') Jenkins set out a list of necessary progressive social reforms: the abolition of the death penalty, decriminalisation of homosexuality, abolition of the Lord Chamberlain's powers of theatre censorship, liberalisation of the licensing and betting laws, liberalisation of the divorce laws, legalisation of abortion, decriminalisation of suicide and more liberal immigration laws. Jenkins concluded:

Let us be on the side of those who want people to be free to live their own lives, to make their own mistakes, and to decide, in an adult way and provided they do not infringe the rights of others, the code by which they wish to live; and on the side of experiment and brightness, of better buildings and better food, of better music (jazz as well as Bach) and better books, of fuller lives and greater freedom. In the long run these things will be more important than the most perfect of economic policies.

In the aftermath of Labour's 1959 defeat, Jenkins appeared on Panorama and argued that Labour should abandon further nationalisation, question its connection with the trade unions and not dismiss a closer association with the Liberal Party. In November he delivered a Fabian Society lecture in which he blamed Labour's defeat on the unpopularity of nationalisation and he repeated this in an article for The Spectator. His Spectator article also called for Britain to accept its diminished place in the world, to grant colonial freedom, to spend more on public services and to promote the right of individuals to live their own lives free from the constraints of popular prejudices and state interference. Jenkins later called it a "good radical programme, although...not a socialist one".

In May 1960, Jenkins joined the Campaign for Democratic Socialism, a Gaitskellite pressure group designed to fight against left-wing domination of the Labour Party. In July 1960 Jenkins resigned from his frontbench role in order to be able to campaign freely for British membership of the Common Market. At the 1960 Labour Party conference in Scarborough, Jenkins advocated rewriting Clause IV of the party's constitution but he was booed. In November he wrote in The Spectator that "unless the Labour Party is determined to abdicate its role as a mass party and become nothing more than a narrow sectarian society, its paramount task is to represent the whole of the Leftward-thinking half of the country—and to offer the prospect of attracting enough marginal support to give that half some share of power".

During 1960–62, his main campaign was British membership of the Common Market, where he became Labour's leading advocate of entry. When Harold Macmillan initiated the first British application to join the Common Market in 1961, Jenkins became deputy chairman of the all-party Common Market Campaign and then chairman of the Labour Common Market Committee. At the 1961 Labour Party conference Jenkins spoke in favour of Britain's entry.

Since 1959, Jenkins had been working on a biography of the Liberal Prime Minister, H. H. Asquith. For Jenkins, Asquith ranked with Attlee as the embodiment of the moderate, liberal intelligence in politics that he most admired. Through Asquith's grandson, Mark Bonham Carter, Jenkins had access to Asquith's letters to his mistress, Venetia Stanley. Kenneth Rose, Michael Foot, Asa Briggs and John Grigg all favourably reviewed the book when it was published in October 1964. However, Violet Bonham Carter wrote a defence of her father in The Times against the few criticisms of Asquith in the book, and Robert Rhodes James wrote in The Spectator that "Asquith was surely a tougher, stronger, more acute man...than Mr. Jenkins would have us believe. The fascinating enigma of his complete decline is never really analysed, nor even understood. ... We required a Sutherland: but we have got an Annigoni". John Campbell claims that "for half a century it has remained unchallenged as the best biography and is rightly regarded as a classic".

Like Healey and Crosland, he had been a close friend of Hugh Gaitskell and for them Gaitskell's death and the elevation of Harold Wilson as Labour Party leader was a setback. For Jenkins, Gaitskell would remain his political hero. After the 1964 general election Jenkins was appointed Minister of Aviation and was sworn of the Privy Council. While at Aviation he oversaw the high-profile cancellations of the BAC TSR-2 and Concorde projects (although the latter was later reversed after strong opposition from the French Government). In January 1965 Patrick Gordon Walker resigned as Foreign Secretary and in the ensuing reshuffle Wilson offered Jenkins the Department for Education and Science; however, he declined it, preferring to stay at Aviation.

== Home Secretary (1965–1967) ==
In the summer of 1965, Jenkins eagerly accepted an offer to replace Frank Soskice as Home Secretary. However Wilson, dismayed by a sudden bout of press speculation about the potential move, delayed Jenkins' appointment until December. Once Jenkins took office – the youngest Home Secretary since Churchill – he immediately set about reforming the operation and organisation of the Home Office. The Principal Private Secretary, Head of the Press and Publicity Department and Permanent Under-Secretary were all replaced. He also redesigned his office, famously replacing the board on which condemned prisoners were listed with a fridge.

Following the 1966 general election, in which Labour won a comfortable majority, Jenkins pushed through a series of police reforms which reduced the number of separate forces from 117 to 49. The Times called it "the greatest upheaval in policing since the time of Peel". His visit to Chicago in September (to study their policing methods) convinced him of the need to introduce two-way radios to the police; whereas the Metropolitan Police possessed 25 radios in 1965, Jenkins increased this to 2,500, and provided similar numbers of radios to the rest of the country's police forces. Jenkins also provided the police with more car radios, which made the police more mobile but reduced the amount of time they spent patrolling the streets. His Criminal Justice Act 1967 introduced more stringent controls on the purchase of shotguns, outlawed last-minute alibis and introduced majority verdicts in juries in England and Wales. The Act was also designed to lower the prison population by the introduction of release under licence, easier bail, suspended sentences and earlier parole.

Immigration was a divisive and provocative issue during the late 1960s and on 23 May 1966 Jenkins delivered a speech on race relations, which is widely considered to be one of his best. Addressing a London meeting of the National Committee for Commonwealth Immigrants he notably defined Integration:

... not as a flattening process of assimilation but as equal opportunity, accompanied by cultural diversity, in an atmosphere of mutual tolerance.

Before going on to ask:

Where in the world is there a university which could preserve its fame, or a cultural centre which could keep its eminence, or a metropolis which could hold its drawing power, if it were to turn inwards and serve only its own hinterland and its own racial group?

And concluding that:

To live apart, for a person, a city, a country, is to lead a life of declining intellectual stimulation.

By the end of 1966, Jenkins was the Cabinet's rising star; the Guardian called him the best Home Secretary of the century "and quite possibly the best since Peel", the Sunday Times called him Wilson's most likeliest successor and the New Statesman labelled him "Labour's Crown Prince".

In a speech to the London Labour Conference in May 1967, Jenkins said his vision was of "a more civilised, more free and less hidebound society" and he further claimed that "to enlarge the area of individual choice, socially, politically and economically, not just for a few but for the whole community, is very much what democratic socialism is about". He gave strong personal support to David Steel's Private Member's Bill for the legalisation of abortion, which became the Abortion Act 1967, telling the Commons that "the existing law on abortion is uncertain and...harsh and archaic", adding that "the law is consistently flouted by those who have the means to do so. It is, therefore, very much a question of one law for the rich and one law for the poor". When the Bill looked likely to be dropped due to insufficient time, Jenkins helped ensure that it received enough parliamentary time to pass and he voted for it in every division.

Jenkins also supported Leo Abse's bill for the decriminalisation of homosexuality, which became the Sexual Offences Act 1967. Jenkins told the Commons: "It would be a mistake to think...that by what we are doing tonight we are giving a vote of confidence or congratulation to homosexuality. Those who suffer from this disability carry a great weight of loneliness, guilt and shame. The crucial question...is, should we add to those disadvantages the full rigour of the criminal law? By its overwhelming decisions, the House has given a fairly clear answer, and I hope that the Bill will now make rapid progress towards the Statute Book. It will be an important and civilising Measure".

Jenkins also abolished the use of flogging in prisons. In July 1967 Jenkins recommended to the Home Affairs Select Committee a bill to end the Lord Chamberlain's power to censor the theatre. This was passed as the Theatres Act 1968 under Jenkins' successor as Home Secretary, James Callaghan. Jenkins also announced that he would introduce legislation banning racial discrimination in employment, which was embodied in the Race Relations Act 1968 passed under Callaghan. In October 1967 Jenkins planned to introduce legislation that would enable him to keep out the 20,000 Kenyan Asians who held British passports (this was passed four months later under Callaghan as the Commonwealth Immigrants Act 1968, which was based on Jenkins' draft).

Jenkins is often seen as responsible for the most wide-ranging social reforms of the late 1960s, with popular historian Andrew Marr claiming "the greatest changes of the Labour years" were thanks to Jenkins. These reforms would not have happened when they did, earlier than in most other European countries, if Jenkins had not supported them. In a speech in Abingdon in July 1969, Jenkins said that the "permissive society" had been allowed to become a dirty phrase: "A better phrase is the 'civilized society', based on the belief that different individuals will wish to make different decisions about their patterns of behaviour and that, provided these do not restrict the freedom of others, they should be allowed to do so within a framework of understanding and tolerance". Jenkins' words were immediately reported in the press as "The permissive society is the civilised society", which he later wrote "was not all that far from my meaning".

For some conservatives, such as Peter Hitchens, Jenkins' reforms remain objectionable. In his book The Abolition of Britain, Hitchens accuses him of being a "cultural revolutionary" who takes a large part of the responsibility for the decline of "traditional values" in Britain. During the 1980s Margaret Thatcher and Norman Tebbit would blame Jenkins for family breakdowns, the decline of respect for authority and the decline of social responsibility. Jenkins replied by pointing out that Thatcher, with her large parliamentary majorities, never attempted to reverse his reforms.

== Chancellor of the Exchequer (1967–1970) ==
From 1967 to 1970 Jenkins served as Chancellor of the Exchequer, replacing James Callaghan following the devaluation crisis of November 1967. Jenkins' ultimate goal as Chancellor was economic growth, which depended on restoring stability to sterling at its new value after devaluation. This could only be achieved by ensuring a surplus in the balance of payments, which had been in a deficit for the previous five years. Therefore, Jenkins pursued deflation, including cuts in public expenditure and increases in taxation, in order to ensure that resources went into exports rather than domestic consumption. Jenkins warned the House of Commons in January 1968 that there was "two years of hard slog ahead".

He quickly gained a reputation as a particularly tough Chancellor with his 1968 budget increasing taxes by £923 million, more than twice the increase of any previous budget to date. Jenkins had warned the Cabinet that a second devaluation would occur in three months if his budget did not restore confidence in sterling. He restored prescription charges (which had been abolished when Labour returned to office in 1964) and postponed the raising of the school leaving age to 16 to 1973 instead of 1971. Housing and road building plans were also heavily cut, and he also accelerated Britain's withdrawal East of Suez. Jenkins ruled out increasing the income tax and so raised the taxes on: drinks and cigarettes (except on beer), purchase tax, petrol duty, road tax, a 50 per cent rise in Selective Employment Tax and a one-off Special Charge on personal incomes. He also paid for an increase in family allowances by cutting child tax allowances.

Despite Edward Heath claiming it was a "hard, cold budget, without any glimmer of warmth" Jenkins' first budget broadly received a warm reception, with Harold Wilson remarking that "it was widely acclaimed as a speech of surpassing quality and elegance" and Barbara Castle that it "took everyone's breath away". Richard Crossman said it was "genuinely based on socialist principles, fair in the fullest sense by really helping people at the bottom of the scale and by really taxing the wealthy". In his budget broadcast on 19 March, Jenkins said that Britain had been living in a "fool's paradise" for years and that it was "importing too much, exporting too little and paying ourselves too much", with a lower standard of living than France or West Germany.

Jenkins' supporters in the Parliamentary Labour Party became known as the "Jenkinsites". These were usually younger, middle-class and university-educated ex-Gaitskellites such as Bill Rodgers, David Owen, Roy Hattersley, Dick Taverne, John Mackintosh and David Marquand. In May–July 1968, some of his supporters, led by Patrick Gordon Walker and Christopher Mayhew, plotted to replace Wilson with Jenkins as Labour leader but he declined to challenge Wilson. A year later his supporters again attempted to persuade Jenkins to challenge Wilson for the party leadership but he again declined. He later wrote in his memoirs that the 1968 plot was "for me...the equivalent of the same season of 1953 for Rab Butler. Having faltered for want of single-minded ruthlessness when there was no alternative to himself, he then settled down to a career punctuated by increasingly wide misses of the premiership. People who effectively seize the prime ministership – Lloyd George, Macmillan, Mrs Thatcher – do not let such moments slip".

In April 1968, with Britain's reserves declining by approximately £500 million every quarter, Jenkins went to Washington to obtain a $1,400 million loan from the International Monetary Fund. Following a further sterling crisis in November 1968, Jenkins was forced to raise taxes by a further £250 million. After this the currency markets slowly began to settle and his 1969 budget represented more of the same with a £340 million increase in taxation to further limit consumption.

By May 1969, Britain's current account position was in surplus, thanks to a growth in exports, a drop in overall consumption and, in part, the Inland Revenue correcting a previous underestimation in export figures. In July Jenkins was also able to announce that the size of Britain's foreign currency reserves had been increased by almost $1 billion since the beginning of the year. It was at this time that he presided over Britain's only excess of government revenue over expenditure in the period 1936–7 to 1987–8. Thanks in part to these successes, there was a high expectation that the 1970 budget would be a more generous one. Jenkins, however, was cautious about the stability of Britain's recovery and decided to present a more muted and fiscally neutral budget. It is often argued that this, combined with a series of bad trade figures, contributed to the Conservative victory at the 1970 general election. Historians and economists have often praised Jenkins for presiding over the transformation in Britain's fiscal and current account positions towards the end of the 1960s. Andrew Marr, for example, described him as one of the 20th century's "most successful chancellors". Alec Cairncross considered Jenkins "the ablest of the four Chancellors I served".

Public expenditure as a proportion of GDP rose from 44 per cent in 1964 to around 50 per cent in 1970. Despite Jenkins' warnings about inflation, wage settlements in 1969–70 increased on average by 13 per cent and contributed to the high inflation of the early 1970s and consequently negated most of Jenkins' efforts to obtain a balance of payments surplus.

== Shadow Cabinet (1970–1974) ==
After Labour unexpectedly lost power in 1970, Jenkins was appointed Shadow Chancellor of the Exchequer by Harold Wilson. Jenkins was also subsequently elected to the deputy leadership of the Labour Party in July 1970, defeating future Labour Leader Michael Foot and former Leader of the Commons Fred Peart at the first ballot. At this time he appeared the natural successor to Harold Wilson, and it appeared to many only a matter of time before he inherited the leadership of the party, and the opportunity to become prime minister.

This changed completely, however, as Jenkins refused to accept the tide of anti-European feeling that became prevalent in the Labour Party in the early 1970s. After a special conference on the EEC was held by the Labour Party on 17 July 1971, which Jenkins was forbidden to address, he delivered one of the most powerful speeches of his career. Jenkins told a meeting of the Parliamentary Labour Party on 19 July: "At conference the only alternative [to the EEC] we heard was 'socialism in one country'. That is always good for a cheer. Pull up the drawbridge and revolutionize the fortress. That's not a policy either: it's just a slogan, and it is one which becomes not merely unconvincing but hypocritical as well when it is dressed up as our best contribution to international socialism". This reopened the old Bevanite–Gaitskellite divide in the Party; Wilson told Tony Benn the day after Jenkins' speech that he was determined to smash the Campaign for Democratic Socialism.

At the 1971 Labour Party conference in Brighton, the NEC's motion to reject the "Tory terms" of entry into the EEC was carried by a large majority. Jenkins told a fringe meeting that this would have no effect on his continued support for Britain's entry. Benn said Jenkins was "the figure dominating this Conference; there is no question about it". On 28 October 1971, he led 69 Labour MPs through the division lobby in support of the Heath government's motion to take Britain into the EEC. In so doing, they were defying a three-line whip and a five-to-one vote at the Labour Party annual conference. Jenkins later wrote: "I was convinced that it was one of the decisive votes of the century, and had no intention of spending the rest of my life answering the question of what did I do in the great division by saying 'I abstained'. I saw it in the context of the first Reform Bill, the repeal of the Corn Laws, Gladstone's Home Rule Bills, the Lloyd George Budget and the Parliament Bill, the Munich Agreement and the May 1940 votes".

Jenkins' action gave the European cause a legitimacy that would have otherwise been absent had the issue been considered solely as a party political matter. However, he was now regarded by the left as a "traitor". James Margach wrote in the Sunday Times: "The unconcealed objective of the Left now is either to humiliate Roy Jenkins and his allies into submission – or drive them from the party". At this stage, however, Jenkins would not fully abandon his position as a political insider, and chose to stand again for deputy leader, an act his colleague David Marquand claimed he later came to regret. Jenkins promised not to vote with the government again and he narrowly defeated Michael Foot on a second ballot.

In accordance with the party whip, Jenkins voted against European Communities Bill 55 times. However, he resigned both the deputy leadership and his shadow cabinet position in April 1972, after the party committed itself to holding a referendum on Britain's membership of the EEC. This led to some former admirers, including Roy Hattersley, choosing to distance themselves from Jenkins. Hattersley later claimed that Jenkins' resignation was "the moment when the old Labour coalition began to collapse and the eventual formation of a new centre party became inevitable". In his resignation letter to Wilson, Jenkins said that if there were a referendum "the Opposition would form a temporary coalition of those who, whatever their political views, were against the proposed action. By this means we would have forged a more powerful continuing weapon against progressive legislation than anything we have known in this country since the curbing of the absolute powers of the old House of Lords".

Jenkins' lavish lifestyle — Wilson once described him as "more a socialite than a socialist" — had already alienated much of the Labour Party from him.

In May 1972, he collected the Charlemagne Prize, which he had been awarded for promoting European unity. In September an ORC opinion poll found that there was considerable public support for an alliance between the 'moderate' wing of the Labour Party and the Liberals; 35 per cent said they would vote for a Labour–Liberal alliance, 27 per cent for the Conservatives and 23.5 per cent for 'Socialist Labour'. The Times claimed that there were "twelve million Jenkinsites". During the spring and summer of 1972, Jenkins delivered a series of speeches designed to set out his leadership credentials. These were published in September under the title What Matters Now, which sold well. In the book's postscript, Jenkins said that Labour should not be a narrow socialist party advocating unpopular left-wing policies but must aim to "represent the hopes and aspirations of the whole leftward thinking half of the country", adding that a "broad-based, international, radical, generous-minded party could quickly seize the imagination of a disillusioned and uninspired British public".

Following Dick Taverne's victory in the 1973 Lincoln by-election, where he stood as "Democratic Labour" in opposition to the official Labour candidate, Jenkins gave a speech to the Oxford University Labour Club denouncing the idea of a new centre party. Jenkins was elected to the shadow cabinet in November 1973 as Shadow Home Secretary. During the February 1974 election, Jenkins rallied to Labour and his campaign was described by David Butler and Dennis Kavanagh as sounding "a note of civilised idealism". Jenkins was disappointed that the Liberal candidate in his constituency won 6000 votes; he wrote in his memoirs that "I already regarded myself as such a closet Liberal that I naïvely thought they ought nearly all to have come to me".

Jenkins wrote a series of biographical essays that appeared in The Times during 1971–74 and which were published as Nine Men of Power in 1974. Jenkins chose Gaitskell, Ernest Bevin, Stafford Cripps, Adlai Stevenson II, Robert F. Kennedy, Joseph McCarthy, Lord Halifax, Léon Blum and John Maynard Keynes. In 1971 Jenkins delivered three lectures on foreign policy at Yale University, published a year later as Afternoon on the Potomac?

== Home Secretary (1974–1976) ==
When Labour returned to power in early 1974, Jenkins was appointed Home Secretary for the second time. Earlier, he had been promised the treasury; however, Wilson later decided to appoint Denis Healey as Chancellor instead. Upon hearing from Bernard Donoughue that Wilson had reneged on his promise, Jenkins reacted angrily. Despite being on a public staircase, he is reported to have shouted "You tell Harold Wilson he must bloody well come to see me ...and if he doesn't watch out, I won't join his bloody government ... This is typical of the bloody awful way Harold Wilson does things!" The Jenkinsites were dismayed by Jenkins' refusal to insist upon the Chancellorship and began to look elsewhere for leadership, thus ending the Jenkinsites as a united group.

Jenkins served from 1974 to 1976. Whereas during his first period as Home Secretary in the 1960s the atmosphere had been optimistic and confident, the climate of the 1970s was much more fractious and disillusioned. After two Northern Irish sisters, Marian Price and Dolours Price, were imprisoned for 20 years for the 1973 Old Bailey bombing, they went on hunger strike in order to be transferred to a prison in Northern Ireland. In a television broadcast in June 1974, Jenkins announced that he would refuse to give in to their demands, although in March 1975 he discreetly transferred them to a Northern Irish prison.

He undermined his previous liberal credentials to some extent by pushing through the controversial Prevention of Terrorism Act in the aftermath of the Birmingham pub bombings of November 1974, which, among other things, extended the length of time suspects could be held in custody and instituted exclusion orders. Jenkins also resisted calls for the death penalty to be restored for terrorist murderers. On 4 December he told the Cabinet committee on Northern Ireland that "everything he heard made him more convinced that Northern Ireland had nothing to do with the rest of the UK". When reviewing Garret FitzGerald's memoirs in 1991, Jenkins proclaimed: "My natural prejudices, such as they are, are much more green than orange. I am a poor unionist, believing intuitively that even Paisley and Haughey are better at dealing with each other than the English are with either".

The Sex Discrimination Act 1975 (which legislated for gender equality and set up the Equal Opportunities Commission) and the Race Relations Act 1976 (which extended to private clubs the outlawing of racial discrimination and founded the Commission for Racial Equality) were two notable achievements during his second time as Home Secretary.

Jenkins opposed Michael Foot's attempts to grant pickets the right to stop lorries during strikes and he was dismayed by Anthony Crosland's decision to grant an amnesty to the 11 Labour councillors at Clay Cross who had been surcharged for refusing to increase council rents in accordance with the Conservatives' Housing Finance Act 1972. After two trade unionists, Ricky Tomlinson and Des Warren (known as the "Shrewsbury Two"), were imprisoned for intimidation and affray for their part in a strike, Jenkins refused to accede to demands from the labour movement that they should be released. This demonstrated Jenkins' increasing estrangement from much of the labour movement and for a time he was heckled in public by people chanting "Free the Two". Jenkins also unsuccessfully tried to persuade the Cabinet to adopt electoral reform in the form of proportional representation and to have the Official Secrets Act 1911 liberalised to facilitate more open government.

Although becoming increasingly disillusioned during this time by what he considered the party's drift to the left, he was the leading Labour figure in the EEC referendum of June 1975 (and was also president of the 'Yes' campaign). In September 1974 he had followed Shirley Williams in stating that he "could not stay in a Cabinet which had to carry out withdrawal" from the EEC. During the referendum campaign, Tony Benn claimed that 500,000 jobs had been lost due to Britain's membership; Jenkins replied on 27 May that "I find it increasingly difficult to take Mr Benn seriously as an economics minister". He added that Britain outside the EEC would enter "an old people's home for fading nations. ... I do not even think it would be a comfortable or agreeable old people's home. I do not much like the look of some of the prospective wardens". The two men debated Britain's membership together on Panorama, which was chaired by David Dimbleby. According to David Butler and Uwe Kitzinger, "they achieved a decidedly more lucid and intricate level of discussion than is commonly seen on political television". Jenkins found it congenial to work with the centrists of all parties in the campaign and the 'Yes' campaign won by two to one.

After the referendum, Wilson demoted Benn to Energy Secretary and attempted to balance the downgrading of Benn with the dismissal of the right-wing minister Reg Prentice from the Department of Education, despite already promising Jenkins that he had no intention of sacking Prentice. Jenkins threatened to resign if Prentice was sacked, telling Wilson that he was "a squalid little man who was using squalid little arguments in order to explain why he was performing so much below the level of events". Wilson quickly backed down. In September Jenkins delivered a speech in Prentice's constituency of Newham to demonstrate solidarity with him after he was threatened with deselection by left-wingers in the constituency party. Jenkins was heckled by both far-left and far-right demonstrators and he was hit in the chest by a flour bomb thrown by a member of the National Front. Jenkins warned that if Prentice was deselected "it is not just the local party that is undermining its own foundations by ignoring the beliefs and feelings of ordinary people, the whole legitimate Labour Party, left as well as right, is crippled if extremists have their way". He added that if "tolerance is shattered formidable consequences will follow. Labour MPs will either have to become creatures of cowardice, concealing their views, trimming their sails, accepting orders, stilling their consciences, or they will all have to be men far far to the left of those whose votes they seek. Either would make a mockery of parliamentary democracy".

In January 1976, he further distanced himself from the left with a speech in Anglesey, where he repudiated ever-higher public spending: "I do not think you can push public expenditure significantly above 60 per cent [of GNP] and maintain the values of a plural society with adequate freedom of choice. We are here close to one of the frontiers of social democracy". A former supporter, Roy Hattersley, distanced himself from Jenkins after this speech.

In May 1976, he told the Police Federation conference to "be prepared first to look at the evidence and to recognize how little the widespread use of prison reduces our crime or deals effectively with many of the individuals concerned". He also responded to the Federation's proposals on law and order: "I respect your right to put them to me. You will no doubt respect my right to tell you that I do not think all the points in sum amount to a basis for a rational penal policy".

When Wilson suddenly resigned as prime minister in March 1976, Jenkins was one of six candidates for the leadership of the Labour Party but came third in the first ballot, behind Callaghan and Michael Foot. Realising that his vote was lower than expected, and sensing that the parliamentary party was in no mood to overlook his actions five years before, he immediately withdrew from the contest. On issues such as the EEC, trade union reform and economic policy he had proclaimed views opposite to those held by the majority of Labour Party activists, and his libertarian social views were at variance with the majority of Labour voters. A famous story alleged that when one of Jenkins' supporters canvassed a group of miners' MPs in the Commons' tea-room, he was told: "Nay, lad, we're all Labour here".

Jenkins had wanted to become Foreign Secretary, but Foot warned Callaghan that the party would not accept the pro-European Jenkins as Foreign Secretary. Callaghan instead offered Jenkins the Treasury in six months' time (when it would be possible to move Denis Healey to the Foreign Office). Jenkins turned the offer down. Jenkins then accepted an appointment as President of the European Commission (succeeding François-Xavier Ortoli) after Callaghan appointed Anthony Crosland to the Foreign Office.

== President of the European Commission (1977–1981) ==
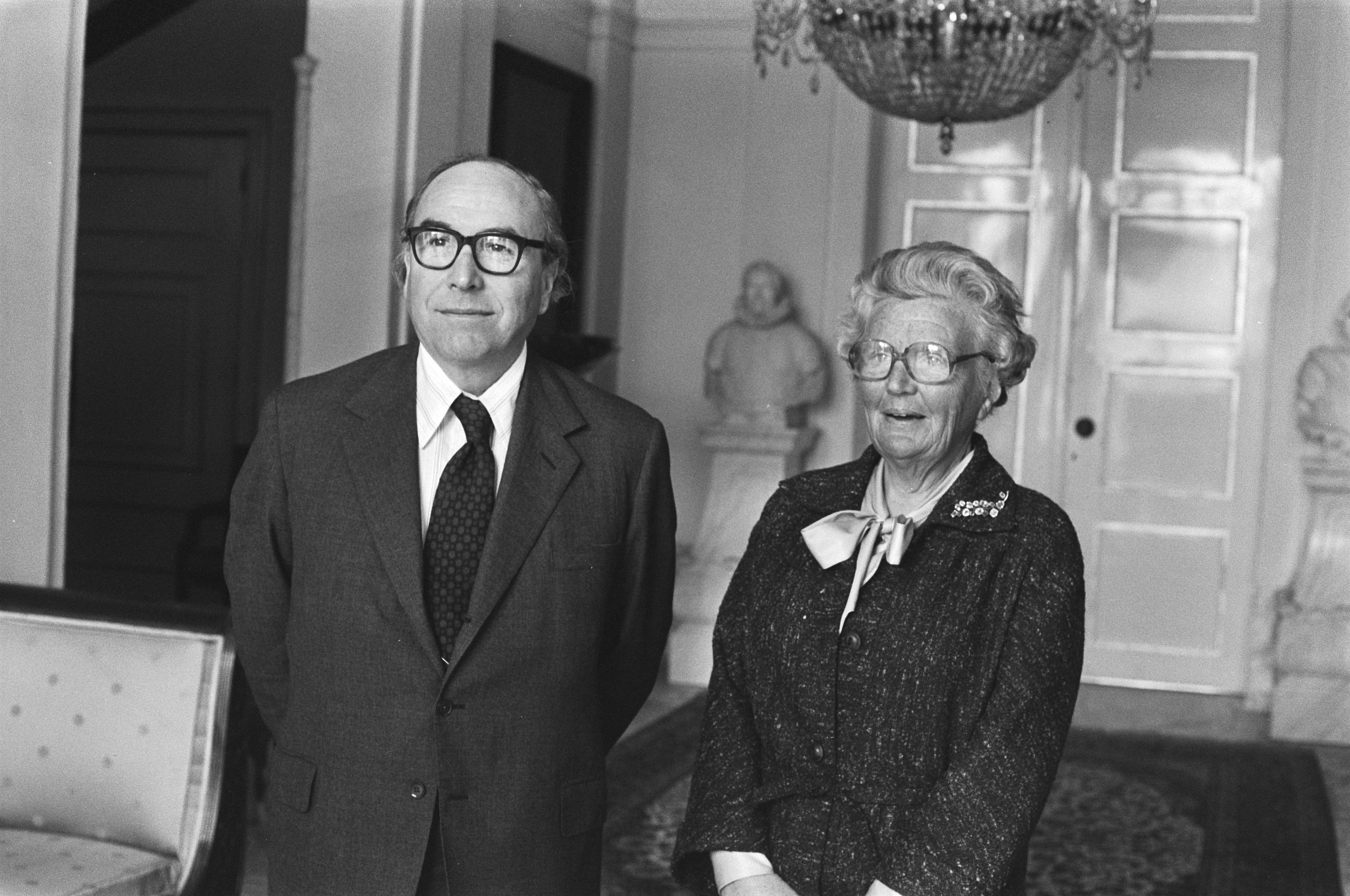
Jenkins (left) as President of the European Commission with Queen Juliana of the Netherlands in 1977

In an interview with The Times in January 1977, Jenkins said that: "My wish is to build an effective united Europe. ... I want to move towards a more effectively organized Europe politically and economically and as far as I am concerned I want to go faster, not slower". The main development overseen by the Jenkins Commission was the development of the Economic and Monetary Union of the European Union from 1977, which began in 1979 as the European Monetary System, a forerunner of the Single Currency or Euro. His biographer calls Jenkins "the godfather of the euro" and claims that among his successors only Jacques Delors has made more impact.

In a speech in Florence in October 1977, Jenkins argued that monetary union would facilitate "a more efficient and developed rationalisation of industry and commerce than is possible under a Customs Union alone". He added that "a major new international currency" would form "a joint and alternative pillar of the world monetary system" which would lead to greater international stability. Monetary union would also combat inflation by controlling the money supply. Jenkins conceded that this would involve the diminution of national sovereignty but he pointed out that "governments which do not discipline themselves already find themselves accepting very sharp surveillance" from the IMF. Monetary union would also promote employment and diminish regional differences. Jenkins ended the speech by quoting Jean Monnet's statement that politics was "not only the art of the possible, but...the art of making possible tomorrow what may seem impossible today".

President Jenkins was the first president to attend a G8 summit on behalf of the Community. He received an Honorary Degree (Doctor of Laws) from the University of Bath in 1978.

In October 1978, Tribune reported (falsely) that Jenkins and his wife had not paid their Labour Party subscription for several years. After this was repeated in the national press, Jenkins' drafted his wife's letter to The Times that refuted the allegation. Jenkins blamed the story on a "malicious Trot in the North Kensington Labour Party". Jenkins was disillusioned with the Labour Party and he was almost certain that he could not stand again as a Labour candidate; in January 1979 he told Shirley Williams that the "big mistake we had made was not to go and support Dick Taverne in 1973; everything had got worse since then".

He did not vote in the 1979 election. After the Conservatives won the election Margaret Thatcher contemplated appointing Jenkins Chancellor of the Exchequer on the strength of his success at cutting public expenditure when he was Chancellor. However, his friend Woodrow Wyatt claimed that Jenkins "had other and fresh fish to fry".

The Director-General of the BBC, Ian Trethowan, invited Jenkins to deliver the Richard Dimbleby Lecture for 1979, which he did on 22 November. The title Jenkins gave to his lecture, "Home Thoughts from Abroad", derived from a Robert Browning poem. He delivered it in the Royal Society of Arts and it was broadcast live on television. Jenkins analysed the decline of the two-party system since 1951 and criticised the excessive partisanship of British politics, which he claimed alienated the bulk of voters, who were more centrist. He advocated proportional representation and the acceptance of "the broad line of division between the public and private sectors", a middle way between Thatcherism and Bennism. Jenkins said that the private sector should be encouraged without too much interference to create as much wealth as possible "but use the wealth so created both to give a return for enterprise and to spread the benefits throughout society in a way that avoids the disfigurements of poverty, gives a full priority to public education and health services, and encourages co-operation and not conflict in industry and throughout society". He then reiterated his long-standing commitment to libertarianism:

You also make sure that the state knows its place...in relation to the citizen. You are in favour of the right of dissent and the liberty of private conduct. You are against unnecessary centralization and bureaucracy. You want to devolve decision-making wherever you sensibly can. ... You want the nation to be self-confident and outward-looking, rather than insular, xenophobic and suspicious. You want the class system to fade without being replaced either by an aggressive and intolerant proletarianism or by the dominance of the brash and selfish values of a 'get rich quick' society. ... These are some of the objectives which I believe could be assisted by a strengthening of the radical centre.

The Listener reprinted the text along with assessments by Enoch Powell, Paul Johnson, Jack Jones, J. A. G. Griffith, Bernard Crick, Neil Kinnock and Jo Grimond. They were all critical; Kinnock thought him misguided as Britain had already suffered from centrist rule for thirty years and Grimond complained that Jenkins' clarion call had come 20 years too late.

Jenkins' last year as President of the European Commission was dominated by Margaret Thatcher's fight for a rebate on Britain's contribution to the EEC budget. He believed that the quarrel was unnecessary and regretted that it soured Britain's relationship with the Community for years. In November 1980 Jenkins delivered the Winston Churchill memorial lecture in Luxembourg, where he proposed a solution to the British budgetary question. The proportion of the Community's budget spent on agriculture should be reduced by extending Community spending into new areas where Britain would receive more benefit, such as regional spending. The size of the Community's budget would, in his scheme, be tripled by transferring from the nation states to the Community competence over social and industrial policy.

== Social Democratic Party (1981–1987) ==
Following his Dimbleby Lecture, Jenkins increasingly favoured the formation of a new social democratic party. He publicly aired these views in a speech to the Parliamentary Press Gallery in June 1980, where he repeated his criticisms of the two-party system and attacked Labour's move to the left. At the previous month's Wembley conference, Labour had adopted a programme which included non-cooperation with the EEC and "a near neutralist and unilateralist" defence policy that would, Jenkins argued, render meaningless Britain's NATO membership. Labour's proposals for further nationalisation and anti-private enterprise policies, Jenkins claimed, were more extreme than in any other democratic country and it was not "by any stretch of the imagination a social democratic programme". He added that a new party could reshape politics and lead to the "rapid revival of liberal social democratic Britain".

The Labour Party conference at Blackpool in September 1980 adopted a unilateralist defence policy, withdrawal from the EEC and further nationalisation, along with Tony Benn's demands for the mandatory reselection of MPs and an electoral college to elect the party leader. In November Labour MPs elected the left-winger Michael Foot over the right-wing Denis Healey and in January 1981 Labour's Wembley conference decided that the electoral college that would elect the leader would give the trade unions 40 per cent of the vote, with MPs and constituency parties 30 per cent each. Jenkins then joined David Owen, Bill Rodgers and Shirley Williams (known as the "Gang of Four") in issuing the Limehouse Declaration. This called for the "realignment of British politics". They then formed the Social Democratic Party (SDP) on 26 March.

Jenkins delivered a series of speeches setting out the SDP's alternative to Thatcherism and Bennism and argued that the solution to Britain's economic troubles lay in the revenue from North Sea oil, which should be invested in public services. He attempted to re-enter Parliament at the Warrington by-election in July 1981 and campaigned on a six-point programme which he put forward as a Keynesian alternative to Thatcherism and Labour's "siege economy", but Labour retained the seat with a small majority.

Despite it being a defeat, the by-election demonstrated that the SDP was a serious force. Jenkins said after the count that it was the first parliamentary election that he had lost in many years, but was "by far the greatest victory in which I have ever participated".

At the SDP's first annual conference in October 1981, Jenkins called for "an end to the futile frontier war between public and private sectors" and proposed an "inflation tax" on excessive pay rises that would restrain rising wages and prices. After achieving this, an SDP government would be able to embark on economic expansion to reduce unemployment.

In March 1982, he fought the Glasgow Hillhead by-election, in what had previously been a Conservative-held seat. Polls at the beginning of the campaign put Jenkins in third place but after a series of ten well-attended public meetings which Jenkins addressed, the tide began to turn in Jenkins' favour, and he was elected with a majority of just over 2,000 on a swing of 19 per cent. The evening after his victory in Hillhead Jenkins told a celebration dinner of 200 party members held at the North British Hotel in Edinburgh "that the SDP had a great opportunity to become the majority party". Jenkins' first intervention in the House of Commons following his election, on 31 March, was seen as a disappointment. The Conservative MP Alan Clark wrote in his diary:

Jenkins, with excessive and almost unbearable gravitas, asked three very heavy statesman-like non-party-political questions of the PM. I suppose he is very formidable, but he was so portentous and long-winded that he started to lose the sympathy of the House about halfway through and the barracking resumed. The Lady replied quite brightly and freshly, as if she did not particularly know who he was, or care.

Whereas earlier in his career, Jenkins had excelled in the traditional set-piece debates in which he spoke from the dispatch box, the focus of parliamentary reporting had now moved to the point-scoring of Prime Minister's Questions, which he struggled with. Seated in the traditional place for third parties in the Commons (the second or third row below the gangway), and without a dispatch box and the gravitas it could have conferred, Jenkins was situated near (and shared the same microphone with) Labour's "awkward squad" that included Dennis Skinner and Bob Cryer, who regularly heckled abuse ("Roy, your flies are undone").

Seven days after Jenkins' by-election victory, Argentina invaded the Falklands and the Falklands War transformed British politics, increased substantially the public's support for the Conservatives and ended any chance that Jenkins' election would reinvigorate the SDP's support. In the SDP leadership election, Jenkins was elected with 56.44 per cent of the vote, with David Owen coming second. The SDP's momentum was also seen to have stalled as a result of its poor performance in the 1983 Darlington by-election, shortly before that year's general election, a contest which was seen as one where the party could do well. Despite much campaigning in the Labour-held seat, the SDP candidate finished a poor third.

During the 1983 election campaign, his position as the prime minister-designate for the SDP–Liberal Alliance was questioned by his close colleagues, as his campaign style was now regarded as ineffective; the Liberal leader David Steel was considered to have a greater rapport with the electorate. During the campaign, Steel called Jenkins to a meeting at his home in Ettrickbridge and proposed that Jenkins take a lower profile and that Steel take over as leader of the campaign. According to Steve Richards while Jenkins rejected Steel's view, the meeting meant Jenkins' "confidence was undermined and he staggered to the finishing line with less verve than he had displayed in the early days of the SDP" and showed little sign of his earlier "exuberance". Jenkins held on to his seat in Hillhead, which was the subject of boundary changes. While on the old boundaries the Conservatives had held the seat prior to Jenkins' victory, it was estimated by the BBC and ITN that on the new boundaries Labour would have captured the seat with a majority of just over 2,000 votes in 1979. Jenkins was challenged by Neil Carmichael, the sitting Labour MP for the Glasgow Kelvingrove constituency which had been abolished and a ministerial colleague of Jenkins in the Wilson governments. Jenkins defeated Carmichael by 1,164 votes to retain his seat in the House of Commons. According to The Glasgow Herald, Labour supporters at the election count in the Kelvin Hall booed and jeered when Jenkins' victory was announced, and he and his wife were "dismayed as police pushed back jostling crowds".

Following the general election, Owen succeeded him unopposed. Jenkins was disappointed with Owen's move to the right, and his acceptance and backing of some of Thatcher's policies. At heart, Jenkins remained an unrepentant Keynesian. In his July 1984 Tawney Lecture, Jenkins said that the "whole spirit and outlook" of the SDP "must be profoundly opposed to Thatcherism. It could not go along with the fatalism of the Government's acceptance of massive unemployment". He also delivered a series of speeches in the Commons attacking the Thatcherite policies of the Chancellor, Nigel Lawson. Jenkins called for more government intervention to support industry and for North Sea oil revenues to be channelled into rebuilding Britain's infrastructure and into educating a skilled workforce. He also attacked the Thatcher government for failing to join the European Exchange Rate Mechanism.

In 1985, he wrote to The Times to advocate the closing down of the political surveillance role of MI5. During the controversy surrounding Peter Wright's Spycatcher, in which he alleged that Harold Wilson had been a Soviet spy, Jenkins rubbished the allegation and reiterated his call for the end of MI5's powers of political surveillance.

In 1986, he won The Spectator's Parliamentarian of the Year award. He continued to serve as SDP Member of Parliament for Glasgow Hillhead until his defeat at the 1987 general election by the Labour candidate George Galloway, after boundary changes in 1983 had changed the character of the constituency. After his defeat was announced, The Glasgow Herald reported that he indicated he would not stand for parliament again. In 1986, his biography of Harry S. Truman was published and the following year his biography of Stanley Baldwin was published.

== Peerage, achievements, books and death (1987–2003) ==
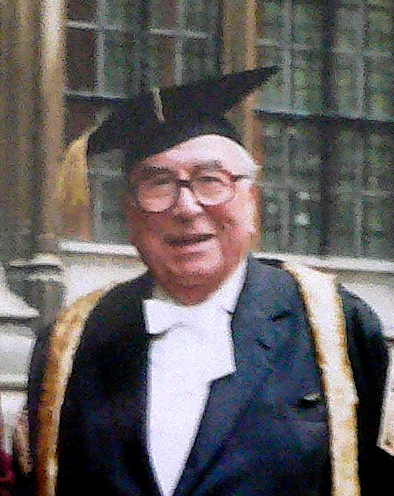
Jenkins robed as Chancellor of Oxford University

From 1987, Jenkins remained in politics as a member of the House of Lords as a life peer with the title Baron Jenkins of Hillhead, of Pontypool in the County of Gwent. Also in 1987, Jenkins was elected Chancellor of the University of Oxford. He was leader of the Liberal Democrats in the Lords from 1988 until 1997.

In 1988, he fought and won an amendment to the Education Reform Act 1988, guaranteeing academic freedom of speech in further and higher education establishments. This affords and protects the right of students and academics to "question and test received wisdom" and has been incorporated into the statutes or articles and instruments of governance of all universities and colleges in Britain.

In 1991, his memoirs, A Life at the Centre, was published by Macmillan, who paid Jenkins a £130,000 advance. He was magnanimous to most of those colleagues with whom he had clashed in the past, except for David Owen, whom he blamed for destroying the idealism and cohesion of the SDP. In the last chapter ('Establishment Whig or Persistent Radical?') he reaffirmed his radicalism, placing himself "somewhat to the left of James Callaghan, maybe Denis Healey and certainly of David Owen". He also proclaimed his political credo:

My broad position remains firmly libertarian, sceptical of official cover-ups and uncompromisingly internationalist, believing sovereignty to be an almost total illusion in the modern world, although both expecting and welcoming the continuance of strong differences in national traditions and behaviour. I distrust the deification of the enterprise culture. I think there are more limitations to the wisdom of the market than were dreamt of in Mrs Thatcher's philosophy. I believe that levels of taxation on the prosperous, having been too high for many years (including my own period at the Treasury), are now too low for the provision of decent public services. And I think the privatisation of near monopolies is about as irrelevant as (and sometimes worse than) were the Labour Party's proposals for further nationalisation in the 1970s and early 1980s.

A Life at the Centre was generally favourably reviewed: in the Times Literary Supplement John Grigg said it was a "marvellous account of high politics by a participant writing with honesty, irony and sustained narrative verve". In The Spectator Anthony Quinton remarked that Jenkins was "not afraid to praise himself and earns the right to do so by unfudged self-criticism". However, there were critical voices: John Smith in The Scotsman charged that Jenkins never had any loyalty to the Labour Party and was an ambitious careerist intent only on furthering his career. John Campbell claims that A Life at the Centre is now generally recognised as one of the best political memoirs. David Cannadine ranked it alongside Duff Cooper's Old Men Forget, R. A. Butler's The Art of the Possible and Denis Healey's The Time of My Life as one of the four best political memoirs of the post-war period.

In 1993, he was appointed to the Order of Merit. Also that year, his Portraits and Miniatures was published. The main body of the book is a set of 6 biographical essays (Rab Butler, Aneurin Bevan, Iain Macleod, Dean Acheson, Konrad Adenauer, Charles de Gaulle), along with lectures, articles and book reviews.

Jenkins' grave in Cat Street cemetery, East Hendred, Oxfordshire

A television documentary about Jenkins was made by Michael Cockerell, titled Roy Jenkins: A Very Social Democrat, and broadcast on 26 May 1996. Although an admiring portrait overall, Cockerell was frank about Jenkins' affairs and both Jenkins and his wife believed that Cockerell had betrayed their hospitality.

Jenkins hailed Tony Blair's election as Labour Party leader in July 1994 as "the most exciting Labour choice since the election of Hugh Gaitskell". He argued that Blair should stick "to a constructive line on Europe, in favour of sensible constitutional innovation...and in favour of friendly relations with the Liberal Democrats". He added that he hoped Blair would not move Labour further to the right: "Good work has been done in freeing it from nationalisation and other policies. But the market cannot solve everything and it would be a pity to embrace the stale dogmas of Thatcherism just when their limitations are becoming obvious".

Jenkins and Blair had been in touch since the latter's time as Shadow Home Secretary, when he admired Jenkins' reforming tenure at the Home Office. Jenkins told Paddy Ashdown in October 1995: "I think Tony treats me as a sort of father figure in politics. He comes to me a lot for advice, particularly about how to construct a Government". Jenkins tried to persuade Blair that the division in the centre-left vote between the Labour and Liberal parties had enabled the Conservatives to dominate the 20th century, whereas if the two left-wing parties entered into an electoral pact and adopted proportional representation, they could dominate the 21st century. Jenkins was an influence on the thinking of New Labour and both Peter Mandelson and Roger Liddle in their 1996 work The Blair Revolution and Philip Gould in his Unfinished Revolution recognised Jenkins' influence.

Before the 1997 election, Blair had promised an enquiry into electoral reform. In December 1997, Jenkins was appointed chair of a Government-appointed Independent Commission on the Voting System, which became known as the "Jenkins Commission", to consider alternative voting systems for the UK. The Jenkins Commission reported in favour of a new uniquely British mixed-member proportional system called "Alternative vote top-up" or "limited AMS" in October 1998, although no action was taken on this recommendation. Blair told Ashdown that Jenkins' recommendations would not pass the Cabinet.

British membership of the European single currency, Jenkins believed, was the supreme test of Blair's statesmanship. However, he was disappointed with Blair's timidity in taking on the Eurosceptic tabloid press. He told Blair in October 1997: "You have to choose between leading Europe or having Murdoch on your side. You can have one but not both". Jenkins was also critical of New Labour's authoritarianism, such as the watering down of the Freedom of Information Act 2000 and their intention to ban fox hunting. By the end of his life Jenkins believed that Blair had wasted his enormous parliamentary majority and would not be recorded in history as a great prime minister; he ranked him between Harold Wilson and Stanley Baldwin.

After Gordon Brown attacked Oxford University for indulging in "old school tie" prejudices because it rejected a state-educated pupil, Laura Spence, Jenkins told the House of Lords in June 2000 that "Brown's diatribe was born of prejudice out of ignorance. Nearly every fact he adduced was false". Jenkins voted for the equalisation of the homosexual age of consent and for repealing Section 28.

Jenkins wrote 19 books, including a biography of Gladstone (1995), which won the 1995 Whitbread Award for Biography, and a much-acclaimed biography of Winston Churchill (2001). His then-designated official biographer, Andrew Adonis, was to have finished the Churchill biography had Jenkins not survived the heart surgery he underwent towards the end of its writing. Historian Paul Johnson called it the best one-volume biography on its subject.

Jenkins underwent heart surgery in the form of a heart valve replacement on 12 October 2000 and postponed his 80th birthday celebrations whilst recovering, by having a celebratory party on 7 March 2001. He died on 5 January 2003, after suffering a heart attack at his home at East Hendred, in Oxfordshire. His last words, to his wife, were, "Two eggs, please, lightly poached". At the time of his death, Jenkins was working on a biography of US President Franklin D. Roosevelt.

After his death, Blair paid tribute to "one of the most remarkable people ever to grace British politics", who had "intellect, vision and an integrity that saw him hold firm to his beliefs of moderate social democracy, liberal reform and the cause of Europe throughout his life. He was a friend and support to me". James Callaghan and Edward Heath also paid tribute and Tony Benn said that as "a founder of the SDP he was probably the grandfather of New Labour". However, he was strongly criticised by others including Denis Healey, who condemned the SDP split as a "disaster" for the Labour Party which prolonged their time in opposition and allowed the Tories to have an unbroken run of 18 years in government.

Writing in The Guardian, Professor of Government at Oxford University Vernon Bogdanor provided this assessment of Jenkins:

Roy Jenkins was both radical and contemporary; and this made him the most influential exponent of the progressive creed in politics in postwar Britain. Moreover, the political creed for which he stood belongs as much to the future as to the past. For Jenkins was the prime mover in the creation of a form of social democracy which, being internationalist, is peculiarly suited to the age of globalisation and, being liberal, will prove to have more staying power than the statism of Lionel Jospin or the corporatist socialism of Gerhard Schröder. ... Roy Jenkins was the first leading politician to appreciate that a liberalised social democracy must be based on two tenets: what Peter Mandelson called an aspirational society (individuals must be allowed to regulate their personal lives without interference from the state); and that a post-imperial country like Britain could only be influential in the world as part of a wider grouping (the EU).

His alma mater, Cardiff University, honoured the memory of Roy Jenkins by naming one of its halls of residence Roy Jenkins Hall.

== Marriage and personal life ==
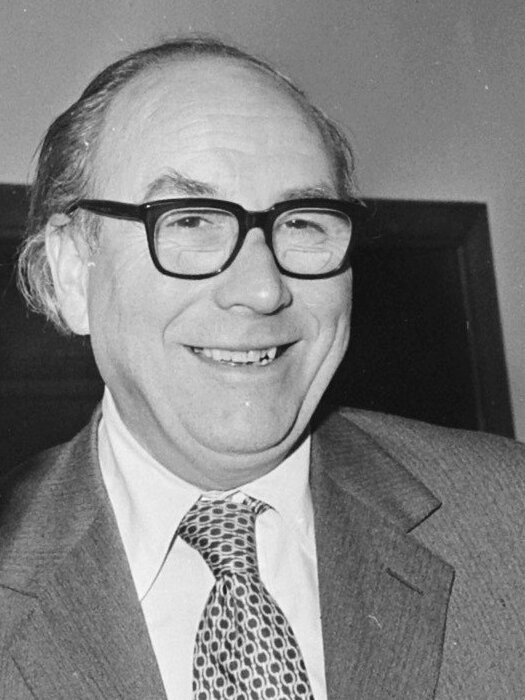
Jenkins in 1977

On 20 January 1945, Jenkins married Mary Jennifer Morris (18 January 1921 – 2 February 2017), the daughter of Sir (George) Parker Morris (1891–1972) and Dorothy Aylmer Morris (née Hale; 1893–1974). They had two sons, Charles and Edward, and a daughter, Cynthia. They were married for almost 58 years until his death, although he had "several affairs", including one with Jackie Kennedy's sister Lee Radziwill. Among his long-term mistresses were Leslie Bonham Carter and Caroline Gilmour, wives of fellow MPs and close friends Mark Bonham Carter and Ian Gilmour. However, these extra-marital relationships were conditional on his lovers having a good relationship with his wife: he later stated that he "could not imagine loving anyone who was not very fond of Jennifer".

Lady Jenkins was appointed Dame Commander of the Order of the British Empire (DBE) in 1985 Birthday Honours List for services to ancient and historical buildings, and was largely known as Dame Jennifer Jenkins.

Early in his life, Jenkins had a relationship with Anthony Crosland. According to the former Liberal Democrat Leader Vince Cable, Jenkins was bisexual.

== In popular culture ==
=== Theatre ===
The play Gang of Three was originally performed at the King's Head Theatre in London in 2025 and will tour the UK in 2026. The play examines the relationship between Denis Healey, Tony Crosland and Roy Jenkins and was written by Khan and Salinsky.

Jenkins was a main character in Steve Waters' 2017 play Limehouse, which premiered at the Donmar Warehouse; Jenkins was portrayed by Roger Allam.

== Works ==
- Roosevelt. Pan Macmillan. 2005. ISBN 0-330-43206-0.
- Churchill: A Biography. Macmillan. 2001. ISBN 0-333-78290-9.
- The Chancellors. Macmillan. 1998. ISBN 0-333-73057-7.
- Gladstone. Macmillan. 1995. ISBN 0-8129-6641-4.
- Portraits and Miniatures. Bloomsbury. 1993. ISBN 978-1-4482-0321-5.
- A Life at the Centre. Macmillan. 1991. ISBN 0-333-55164-8.
- European Diary 1977–81. Collins. 1989.
- Gallery of Twentieth Century Portraits and Oxford Papers. David & Charles. 1988. ISBN 0-7153-9299-9.
- Truman. HarperCollins. 1986. ISBN 0-06-015580-9.
- Baldwin. Collins. 1984. ISBN 0-00-217586-X.
- Nine Men of Power. Hamish Hamilton. 1974. ISBN 978-0241891384.
- Essays and Speeches. Collins. 1967.
- Asquith (2nd rev. ed.). Collins. 1978 [1964]. ISBN 0-00-211021-0.
- The Labour Case. Penguin. 1959.
- Sir Charles Dilke: A Victorian Tragedy (2nd rev. ed.). Collins. 1965 [1958]. ISBN 0-333-62020-8.
- Mr. Balfour's Poodle: Peers v. People. Collins. 1954. OCLC 436484.
- Pursuit of Progress: a Critical Analysis of the Achievement and Prospect of the Labour Party. Heinemann. 1953.
- Mr. Attlee: an Interim Biography. London: Heinemann. 1948.

Parliament of the United Kingdom
Preceded by Edward Carson	Baby of the House; 1948–1950	Succeeded by Peter Baker
Preceded by John Martin	Member of Parliament for Southwark Central; 1948–1950	Constituency abolished
New constituency	Member of Parliament for Birmingham Stechford; 1950–1977	Succeeded by Andrew MacKay
Preceded by Tam Galbraith	Member of Parliament for Glasgow Hillhead; 1982–1987	Succeeded by George Galloway
Political offices
Preceded by Frank Soskice	Home Secretary; 1965–1967	Succeeded by James Callaghan
Preceded by James Callaghan	Chancellor of the Exchequer; 1967–1970	Succeeded by Iain Macleod
Preceded by Robert Carr	Home Secretary; 1974–1976	Succeeded by Merlyn Rees
Preceded by François-Xavier Ortoli	President of the European Commission; 1977–1981	Succeeded by Gaston Thorn
Party political offices
Preceded by Arthur Skeffington	Chair of the Fabian Society; 1957–1958	Succeeded by Eirene White
Preceded by George Brown	Deputy Leader of the Labour Party; 1970–1972	Succeeded by Edward Short
New post	Leader of the Social Democratic Party; 1982–1983	Succeeded by David Owen
Preceded by The Baroness Seear	Leader of the Liberal Democrats in the House of Lords; 1988–1997	Succeeded by The Lord Rodgers of Quarry Bank
Academic offices
Preceded by Harold Macmillan	Chancellor of the University of Oxford; 1987–2003	Succeeded by Chris Patten
