= Abuse of Power =

Abuse of power is the commission of an unlawful act in an official capacity.

The term can also refer to:

- Abuse of Power (film), a 1971 Greek film directed by Stavros Tsiolis and starring Nikos Kourkoulos
- Abuse of Power (novel), a 2011 American novel by Michael Savage
- The Abuse of Power, a 1979 memoir by James Margach
- Abuse of Power: The New Nixon Tapes, a 1997 book by Stanley Kutler

== See also ==
- Abusive power and control
