= Harry Day (politician) =

British theatre owner and politician (1880–1939)

Harry Day MP
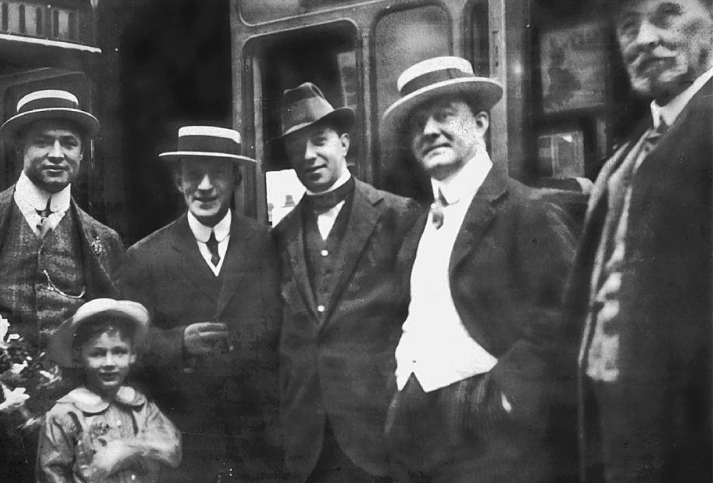
- Left to right: Theodore Hardeen with his son, Joe Hyman, Harry Day, Lord Northcliffe and C. Dundas Slater.
- Born: 16 September 1880
- Died: 16 September 1939 (aged 59)
- Occupations: Politician, theatre owner

Harry Day (16 September 1880 – 16 September 1939) was a British theatre owner and Labour Party politician. In the early 1900s, he worked as a manager for the magician Harry Houdini.

== Biography ==
Day was born as Edward Lewis Levy in the United States. He legally changed his name to Harry Day.

He was the son of David John Day. He has sold tickets for Barnum & Bailey's travelling circus. He subsequently worked as a bill poster before gaining ownership of theatres in Bristol, Bedford and Dover. He was also briefly Harry Houdini's manager.

Day had managed Houdini's European tours. In June, 1900 he helped Houdini arrange an interview with C. Dundas Slater the manager of Alhambra Theatre. Slater requested a demonstration and challenged Houdini to perform a handcuff escape in the jail section at Scotland Yard. Houdini successfully escaped from the handcuffs with ease, impressing William Melville the first chief of the British Secret Service Bureau. Houdini was booked into the Alhambra Theatre and his magic show was an immediate hit, his salary rose to $300 a week.

In 1901 he married Katherine Amelia Rea, an actor with the stage name "Kitty Colyer", and they had two children. Day was Jewish.

In 1909, Houdini gave him a painting with the message "To Harry Day from his sincere pal, Harry Houdini." This painting was later damaged in a break in at his home.

== Politician ==
Day was elected as Member of Parliament (MP) for Southwark Central at the 1924 general election, having unsuccessfully contested the seat in 1923. He was re-elected in 1929 with a much-increased majority, but when Labour split at the 1931 general election he lost the seat to a Conservative supporter of the National Government.

He was elected to the London County Council as a councillor for Southwark Central in the same year he lost his parliamentary seat.

Day regained his Commons seat at the 1935 general election, holding both parliamentary and council seats until his death.

In 1939, he became ill and travelled to Canada for his health. He died on his 59th birthday in Quebec.

Parliament of the United Kingdom
Preceded by James Daniel Gilbert	Member of Parliament for Southwark Central; 1924 – 1931	Succeeded by Ian Macdonald Horobin
Preceded by Ian Macdonald Horobin	Member of Parliament for Southwark Central; 1935 – 1939	Succeeded by John Hanbury Martin
