= 1948 Southwark Central by-election =

UK parliamentary by-election

A by-election for the constituency of Southwark Central in the United Kingdom House of Commons was held on 29 April 1948, caused by the resignation of the incumbent Labour MP John Hanbury Martin. The result was a hold for the Labour Party, with their candidate Roy Jenkins, who was to become a prominent figure in British politics throughout the 1960s, 1970s and 1980s.

== Result ==
Southwark Central by-election, 1948
Party	Candidate	Votes	%	±%
Labour	Roy Jenkins	8,744	65.4	−6.5
Conservative	J M Greenwood	4,623	34.6	+6.5
Majority		4,121	30.8	−13.0
Turnout		13,367		
Labour hold		Swing		

== Previous result ==
General election 1945: Southwark Central
Party	Candidate	Votes	%	±%
Labour	John Hanbury Martin	9,336	71.9	+18.6
Conservative	WA Steward	3,654	28.1	New
Majority		5,682	43.8	+37.2
Turnout		12,990	62.8	
Labour hold		Swing		

== Sources ==
- Craig, F. W. S. (1983) [1969]. British parliamentary election results 1918-1949 (3rd edition ed.). Chichester: Parliamentary Research Services. ISBN 0-900178-06-X.
- Leigh Rayment's Historical List of MPs
