= Van der Elst =

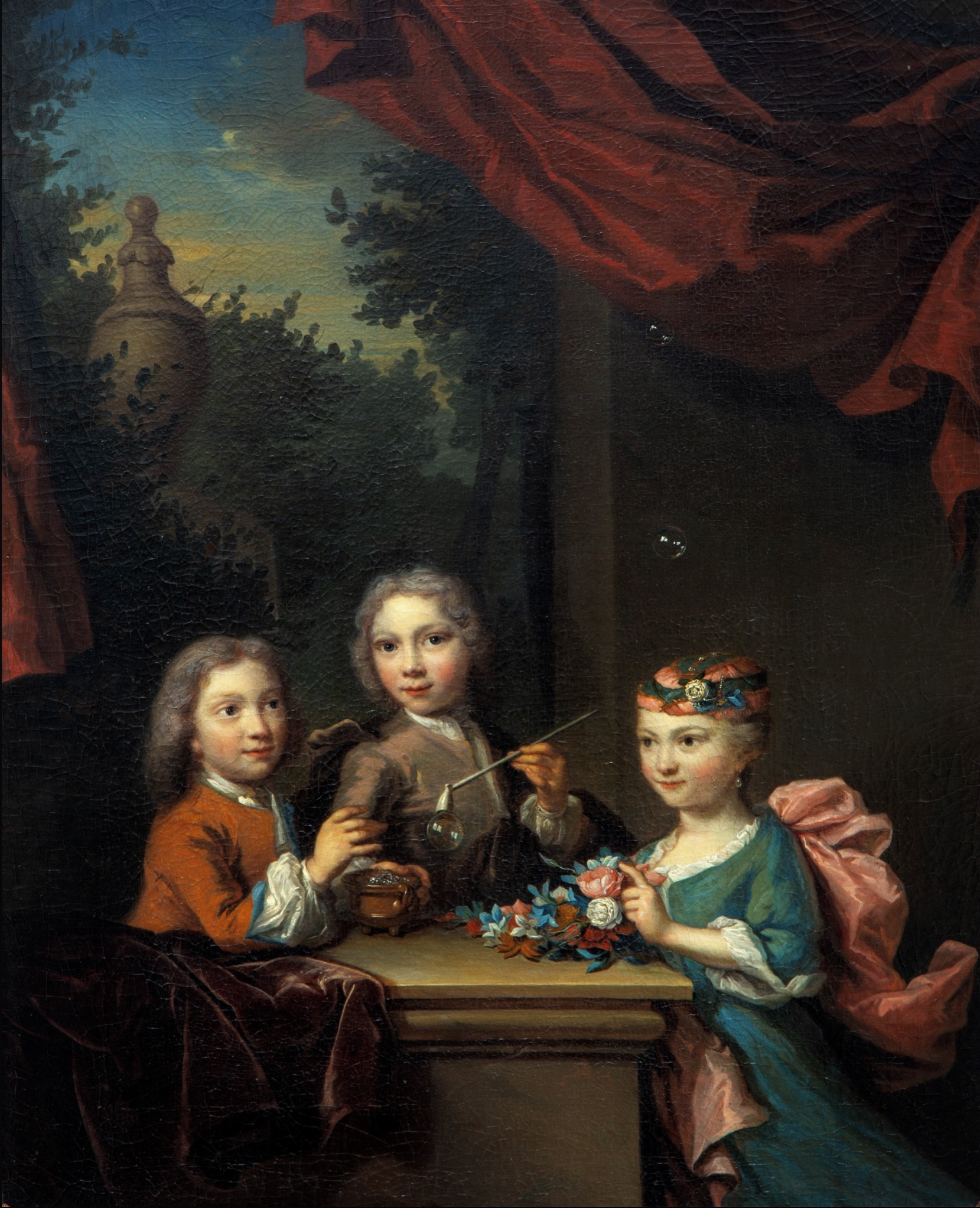
3 van der Elst children painted by Arnold Boonen

van der Elst or Van Der Elst is a Dutch toponymic surname meaning "from the alder (woods)". The forms Elst and Van Elst may also refer to an origin in the city of Elst, Gelderland, the town Elst, Utrecht, or other villages by that name. Certain branches belong to the Belgian nobility as well to important Dutch patrician non-noble families (Nederlands Patriciaat). The name may refer to:

- Barbe (Barbara) van der Elst, Marchioness of Antwerp ( - 1581), married in 1543 to Jean d'Arschot-Schoonhoven, Marquess of Antwerp.
- Bartel van der Elst (or "Van der Helst"; 1613–1670), Dutch portrait painter
- Bartholomeus van der Elst van Bleskensgraaf, Seigneur of Bleskensgraaf (1789 - 1861), Alderman of Dordrecht
- Cédric Van der Elst (b. 1980), Belgian football midfielder
- François Van der Elst (1954–2017), Belgian football winger, brother of Leo
- Franky Van der Elst (b. 1961), Belgian football midfielder and manager
- Franz-Peter Tebartz-van Elst (b. 1959), German Roman Catholic bishop
- Ingrid van der Elst (b. 1955), Dutch cricketer and field hockey player
- Jan van der Elst. Alderman of Antwerp 1404-07, 1411 and 1413; Dean of the guild of Antwerp in 1408. Son of knight Gerard van der Elst, Ducal receiver of Brussels 1412-18 and commissioned by the States as receiver-general of Brabant 1415-16.
- Jehan van der Elst, knight, Seigneur of Breeschaet (1462 - 1522), married to Barbara de Mechelen
- Joseph Baron van der Elst (1896–1971), Belgian diplomat, art collector and writer
- Karl Frans van der Elst van Bleskensgraaf (1938 - 2000), Captain of KLM Flight KL 867, which encountered volcanic ash over Alaska in 1989.
- Leo Van der Elst (b. 1962), Belgian football midfielder, brother of François
- Léon Baron van der Elst (1865–1933), Advisor to King Albert 1 and diplomat
- Lodewijk van der Elst (or "Van der Helst"; 1642–aft.1684), Dutch portrait painter, son of Bartel
- Ottho Johannes van der Elst van Bleskensgraaf (1858–1913), Seigneur of Bleskensgraaf
- Reinier van der Elst, Marquess of Rijen. Alderman of Antwerp in 1385-1417. Steward of Antwerp from 1396,-1399. Schout of Mechelen 1400-05, Schout of Antwerp 1407-1408.
- Thomas van der Elst, knight, Seigneur of Breeschaet (1500 - 1528), married to Marie de Scheijff.
- Violet Van der Elst (1882–1966), English businesswoman who campaigned against capital punishment and owner of Harlaxton Manor.

== See also ==
- Van Der Elst visa
