= Ian Horobin =

British politician (1899–1976)

Sir Ian Horobin
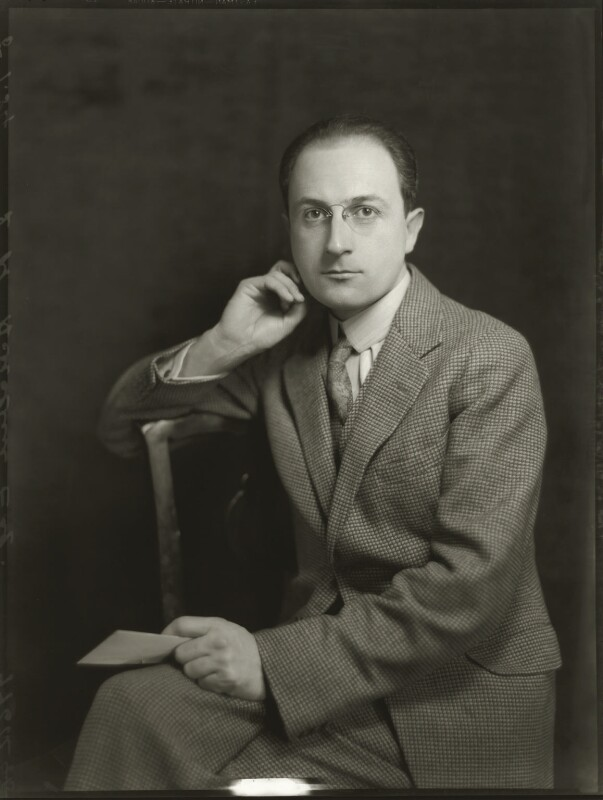

Parliamentary Secretary to the Minister for Power
- In office 1958–1959

Member of Parliament for Oldham East
- In office 25 October 1951 – 18 September 1959
- Preceded by: Frank Fairhurst
- Succeeded by: Charles Mapp

Member of Parliament for Southwark Central
- In office 27 October 1931 – 25 October 1935
- Preceded by: Harry Day
- Succeeded by: Harry Day

Personal details
- Born: Ian Macdonald Horobin; 16 November 1899 United Kingdom
- Died: 5 June 1976 (aged 76) Tangier, Morocco
- Party: Conservative
- Other political affiliations: National (1931–1935)
- Education: Sidney Sussex College, Cambridge
- Occupation: Politician, poet, veteran
- Awards: Knight Bachelor

Military service
- Rank: Squadron Leader
- Battles/wars: World War I; World War II

Sir Ian Macdonald Horobin (16 November 1899 – 5 June 1976) was a British Conservative Party politician, poet, and veteran of the First and Second World Wars. Horobin served as the Parliamentary Secretary to the Minister for Power from 1958 to 1959, but stood down from politics shortly before his conviction for indecent assault, for which he served four years in prison.

== Biography ==
=== Education and career ===
Horobin was the son of J. C. Horobin, the principal of Homerton College, Cambridge, and his wife, Maud Adeline née Ford (known after her second marriage as M. A. Cloudesley Brereton). He was educated at Highgate School and Sidney Sussex College, Cambridge, where he read economics.

Horobin initially served with the Royal Naval Reserve in World War I before joining the Royal Air Force. After coming down from Cambridge, in 1923 he became the warden of the Mansfield House University Settlement in London's East End, which worked with vulnerable young men and children. Horobin helped raise over £500,000 for the settlement, and left it when he was elected as the National Member of Parliament (MP) for Southwark Central, a seat he held until 1935.

Upon the outbreak of the Second World War, Horobin rejoined the Royal Air Force, and was promoted to squadron leader. In 1941 he was captured by the Japanese and detained as a prisoner of war until his release in 1945. The Japanese tortured and beat Horobin after he refused to reveal the methods of escape by key prisoners led by Laurens van der Post, and he played an important role in facilitating morale among prisoners at the Soekaboemi prison camp after volunteering as the camp's hygiene officer. Horobin returned to work at Mansfield House settlement after the war was over, remaining there until 1961. He was given a knighthood in 1955 for his work at the institution.

Horobin stood in the Oldham West seat for the Conservative Party at the 1950 general election, where he lost to Labour's Leslie Hale. In 1951 Horobin successfully contested Oldham East, and held the seat with a narrow majority of 380 in the 1955 election. Horobin was the first member of the Conservative government to lose his seat at the 1959 general election.

It was announced on 29 March 1962 that Horobin was to receive a life peerage, but he withdrew his acceptance on 13 April, stating that the demands of the role would be too much for him. About this time, he sold a number of paintings from his collection at Sotheby's.

=== Indecency trial ===
After denunciation by a clergyman, Horobin was held on indecency charges in May 1962, accused of several charges of indecent assault on boys aged under 16 in 1958 and 1959. A 17-year-old boy was also held with Horobin and he was jointly charged with committing two acts of indecency with Horobin in 1961, and attempting to procure another man for an act of indecency with Horobin.

As Warden of Mansfield House University Settlement, Horobin lived in a small flat there. According to Michael Bloch, Horobin's homosexual tastes were common knowledge among the residents, who were rewarded for yielding to Horobin's demands. He apparently formed "affectionate relationships" with some of them.

At the trial in June 1962, where Horobin was defended by Peter Rawlinson, QC, the prosecution alleged that Horobin had told his secretary that he was "virtually married" to the 17-year-old. Several witnesses at the trial testified to Horobin's behaviour and the manner of his assaults. Horobin admitted ten charges of assault in July 1962, and was sentenced to four years imprisonment. Horobin had told the secretary of the settlement that his relationships with boys had been going on for over 40 years and described homosexuals as "... us poor devils who are born like this; nothing can change me. It is natural for us to love boys in this way."

Unrepentant, Horobin told his friend John Betjeman: "I broke the law with my eyes open all my life until I went to prison. I broke it in prison. I broke it immediately I came out of prison, and I have not the slightest intention of ever paying any attention to it."

=== Other activities ===
Horobin presented two episodes of BBC radio's The Week in Westminster in 1932. In 1935 a judge found in favour of Horobin in a case of trespass at his home in Essex, Blue House Farm in Lambourne End. Horobin had put a gate across a lane leading to Hainault Forest having been disturbed by the parking of cars on the lane, and it had been torn down by a woman who claimed that it had always been used for this purpose. The judge ruled that the nature of the lane had not been that it was to be presumed a place to park vehicles.

== Death ==
Horobin moved to Tangier, Morocco, after his release from prison, and died there in 1976.

== Bibliography ==
- The Pleasures of Planning (1935)
- Poems (1935)
- More Poems (1939)
- Collected Poems (1973)

Parliament of the United Kingdom
Preceded by Harry Day	Member of Parliament for Southwark Central; 1931–1935	Succeeded by Harry Day
Preceded by Frank Fairhurst	Member of Parliament for Oldham East; 1951–1959	Succeeded by Charles Mapp
