= Violet Van der Elst =

British entrepreneur and campaigner

- Born: Violet Anne Dodge; 4 January 1882; Feltham, Middlesex, England
- Died: 30 April 1966 (aged 84); Ticehurst, Sussex, England
- Known for: activities against the death penalty
- Spouse(s): (1) Henry Arthur Nathan (2) Jean Julien Romain Van der Elst

Violet Van der Elst (4 January 1882 – 30 April 1966) was a British entrepreneur and campaigner best remembered for her activities against the death penalty.

== Biography ==
She was born Violet Anne Dodge, the daughter of a coal porter and a washerwoman, she herself worked as a scullery maid. In 1903, she married Henry Arthur Nathan, a civil engineer 13 years her senior. She developed cosmetics including Shavex, the first brush-less shaving cream, and became a successful businesswoman. After her first husband died on 15 November 1927, she married Jean Julien Romain Van der Elst, a Belgian who had been working for her as a manager but was also a painter.

Having amassed a huge personal fortune she purchased Harlaxton Manor, in Lincolnshire, England in 1937. She restored the house, having renamed it Grantham Castle, and had it wired for electricity.

She gained publicity from her vocal campaigns against capital punishment, and stood three times, unsuccessfully, as an independent candidate to be a Member of Parliament. Firstly she fought the Putney constituency at the 1935 general election, coming third. Then she stood for Southwark Central in the 1940 by-election as an independent supporting the National Government, coming third. And lastly, she contested Hornchurch at the 1945 general election, coming fourth.

She lost most of her fortune through "obsessive litigation". She was forced to sell her country house and moved to a flat in Knightsbridge, London, in 1959.

== Publications ==
She wrote the book On the Gallows in 1937 as part of her efforts to eradicate the death penalty. In the same year she published a collection of 13 ghost stories, The Torture Chamber and Other Stories.

== Death and legacy ==
Largely forgotten, she died in Ticehurst House Hospital, a lunatic asylum, in Ticehurst, Sussex, on 30 April 1966, aged 84; her wealth reduced to £15,528, having seen the abolition of capital punishment for murder in Britain the previous year.

Van der Elst was portrayed by Frances Bennett in the Granada Television series Lady Killers, in an episode depicting the 1936 trial of Charlotte Bryant. In the 2005 film Pierrepoint, she is played by Ann Bell.

== Bibliography ==
- Jenkins, Simon (2003). England's Thousand Best Houses. London: Penguin Books. ISBN 978-0-7139-9596-1. OCLC 813876627.
- Gattey, Charles Neilson (1972). The Incredible Mrs. Van der Elst. London: Leslie Frewin Ltd. ISBN 978-0856320156.
- Van der Elst, Violet (1937a). On the Gallows. London: Doge Press. ASIN B00584QIPE.
- Van der Elst, Violet (1937b). The Torture Chamber and Other Stories. London: Doge Press. ASIN B0018G2IOG.
- Van der Elst, Violet (1945s). Death of the Vampire Baroness and other Thrilling Stories.
