= Arnold Boonen =

Dutch painter (1669–1729)

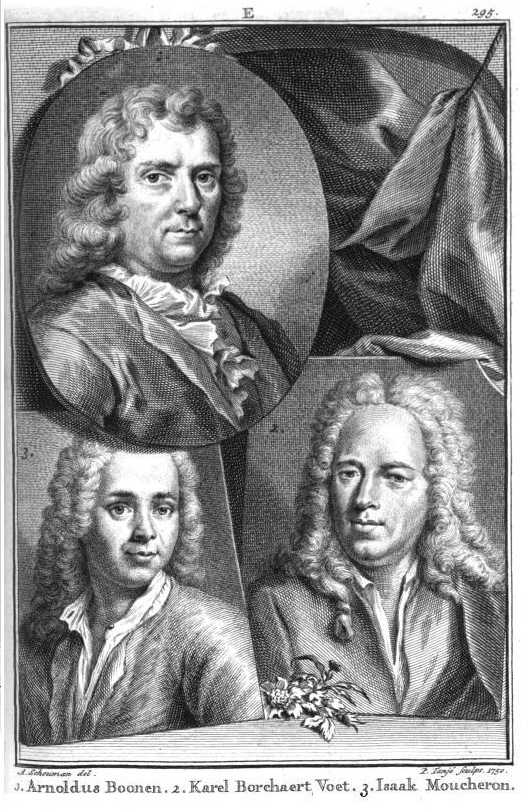
Portrait of Arnoldus Boonen (upper left) in Jan van Gool's "Nieuw Schouburg", 1750

Arnold van Boonen (16 December 1669 – 2 October 1729) was a Dutch portrait painter.

== Life ==
He was born at Dordrecht, in the Dutch Republic in 1669. He was a pupil first of Arnold Verbuis, and then of Godefried Schalken. He painted genre pictures in the style of the latter, representing subjects by candlelight. However, due to much encouragement in portrait painting, he shifted almost entirely to that branch of art. His style was well adapted to succeed in it. An excellent colourist, a faithful designer of his model, and highly skilled, he was soon distinguished as one of the ablest artists of his day. He painted a great number of portraits of the most distinguished people of his time, among whom were Peter the Great, the Elector of Mentz, the Landgrave of Hesse-Darmstadt, the Prince and Princess of Orange, the great Duke of Marlborough, and several others. He created large paintings for different company halls in Amsterdam and Dordrecht. He died in 1729.

The Dresden Gallery has seven works by him, and the Woman Singing in the Lille Gallery is also attributed to him. His son, Kasper van Boonen, also painted portraits, but in no way proved himself equal to his father.

== Gallery ==
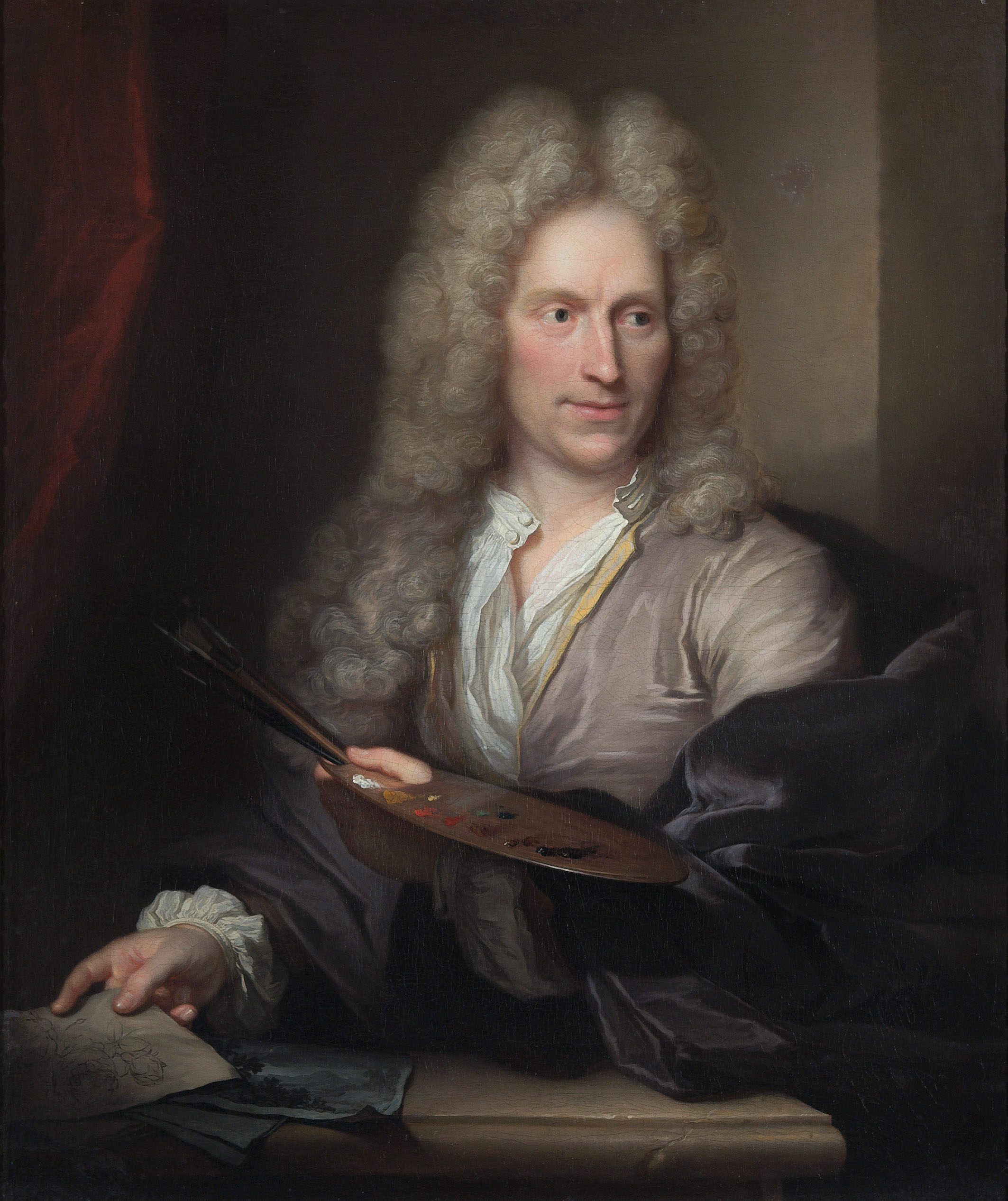
Portrait of Jan van Huysum, c. 1720

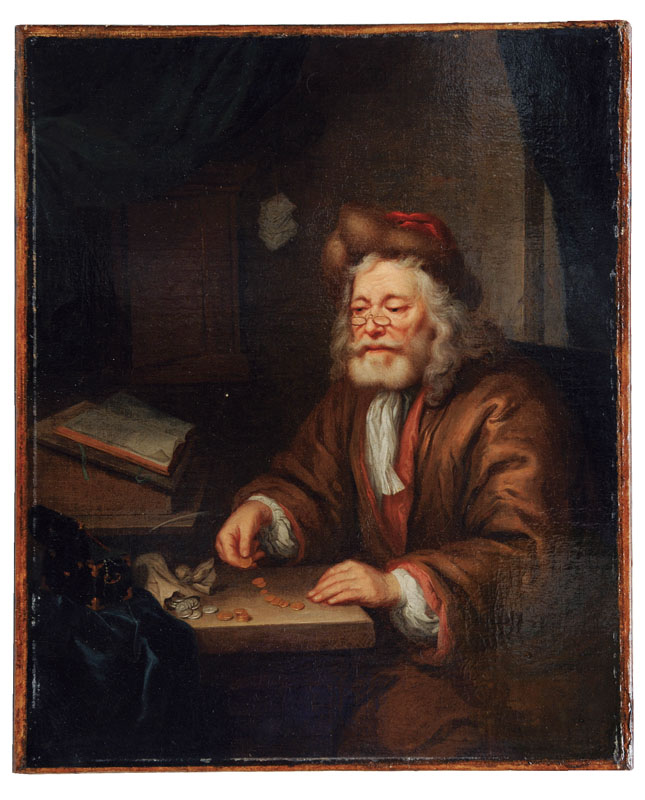
Merchant in his office, before 1729

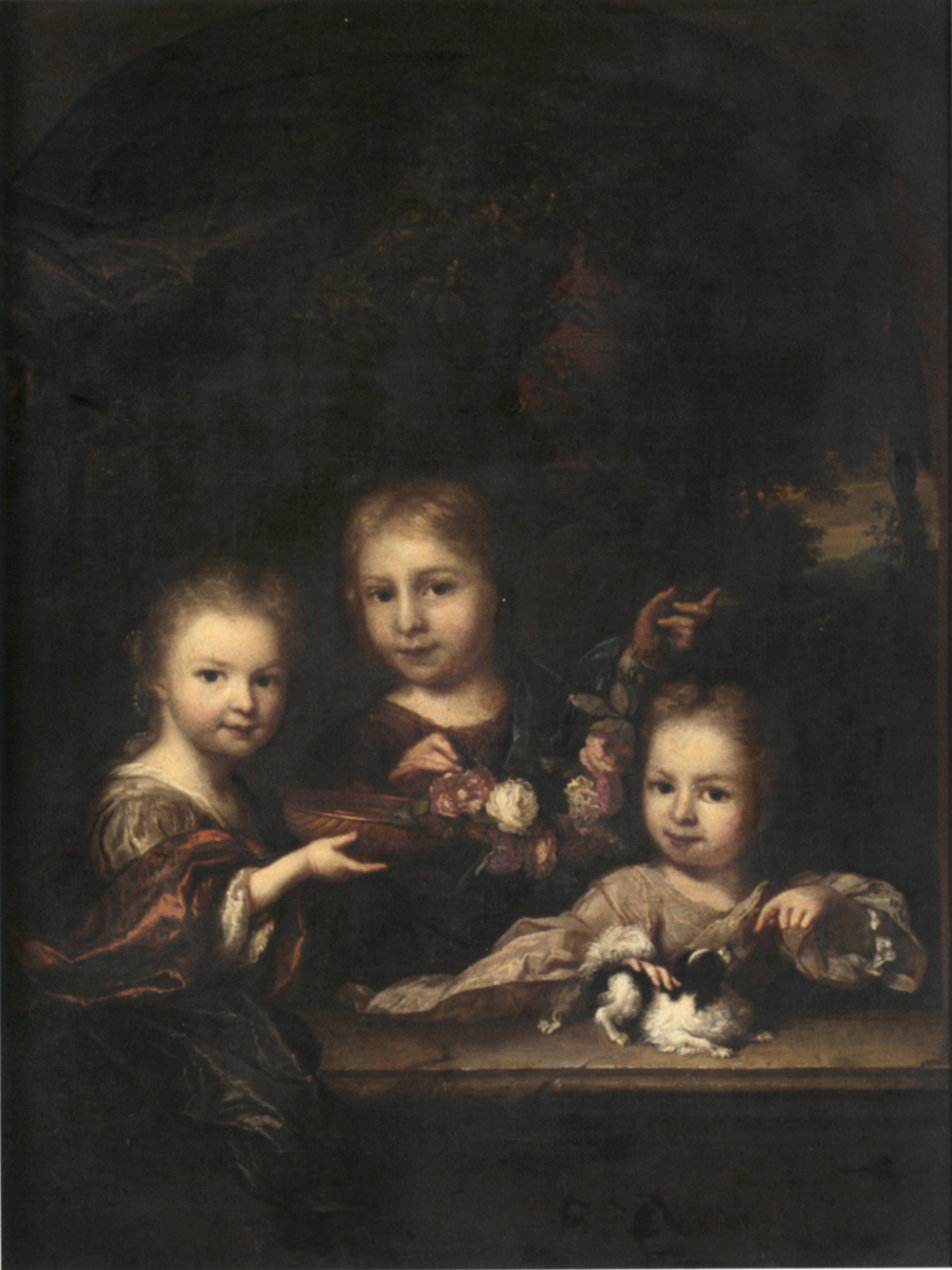
Detail of a painting with (left) Agatha Levina Geelvinck (1701-1761), c. 1705

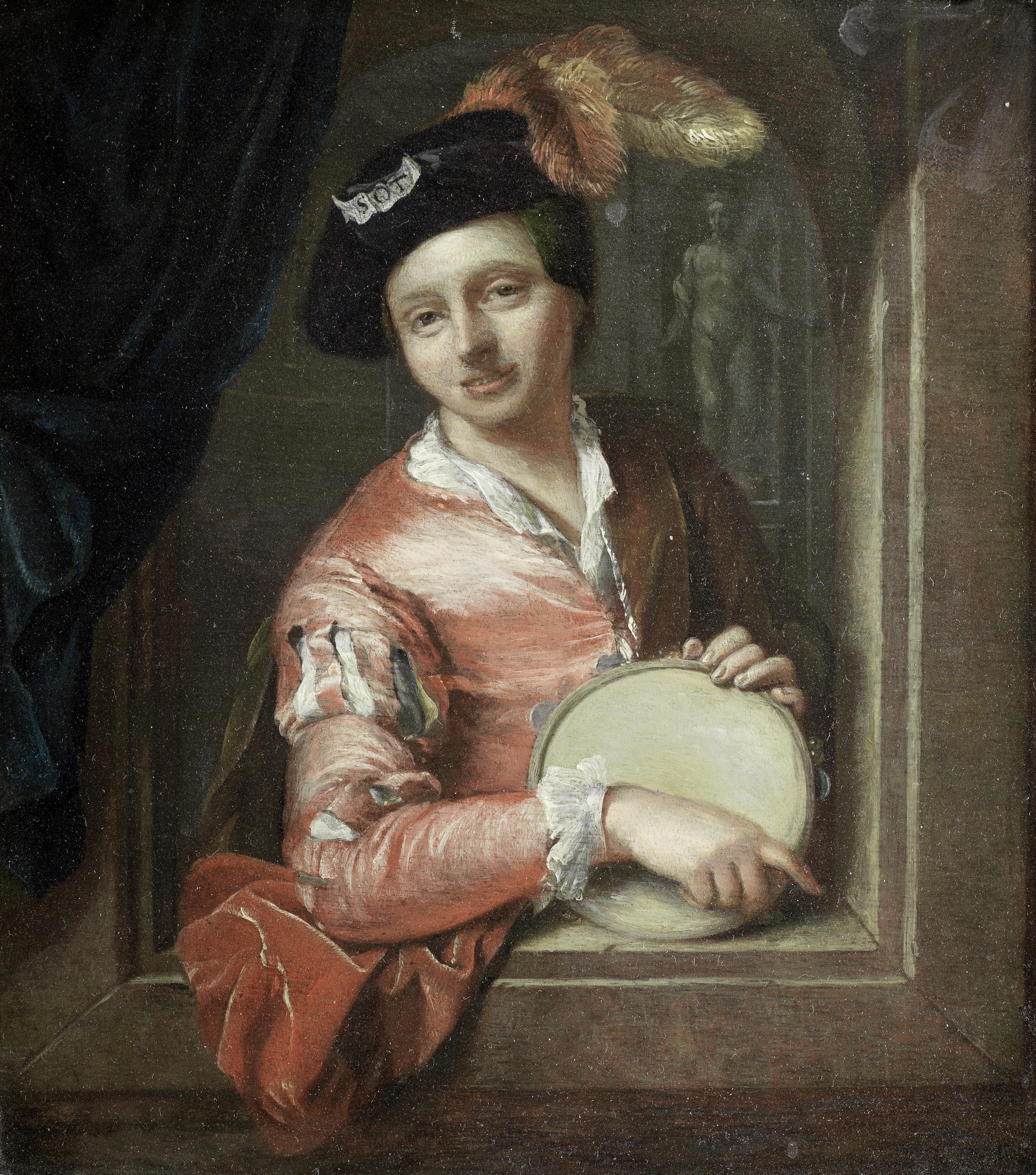
A young boy holding a tambourine, c. 1729

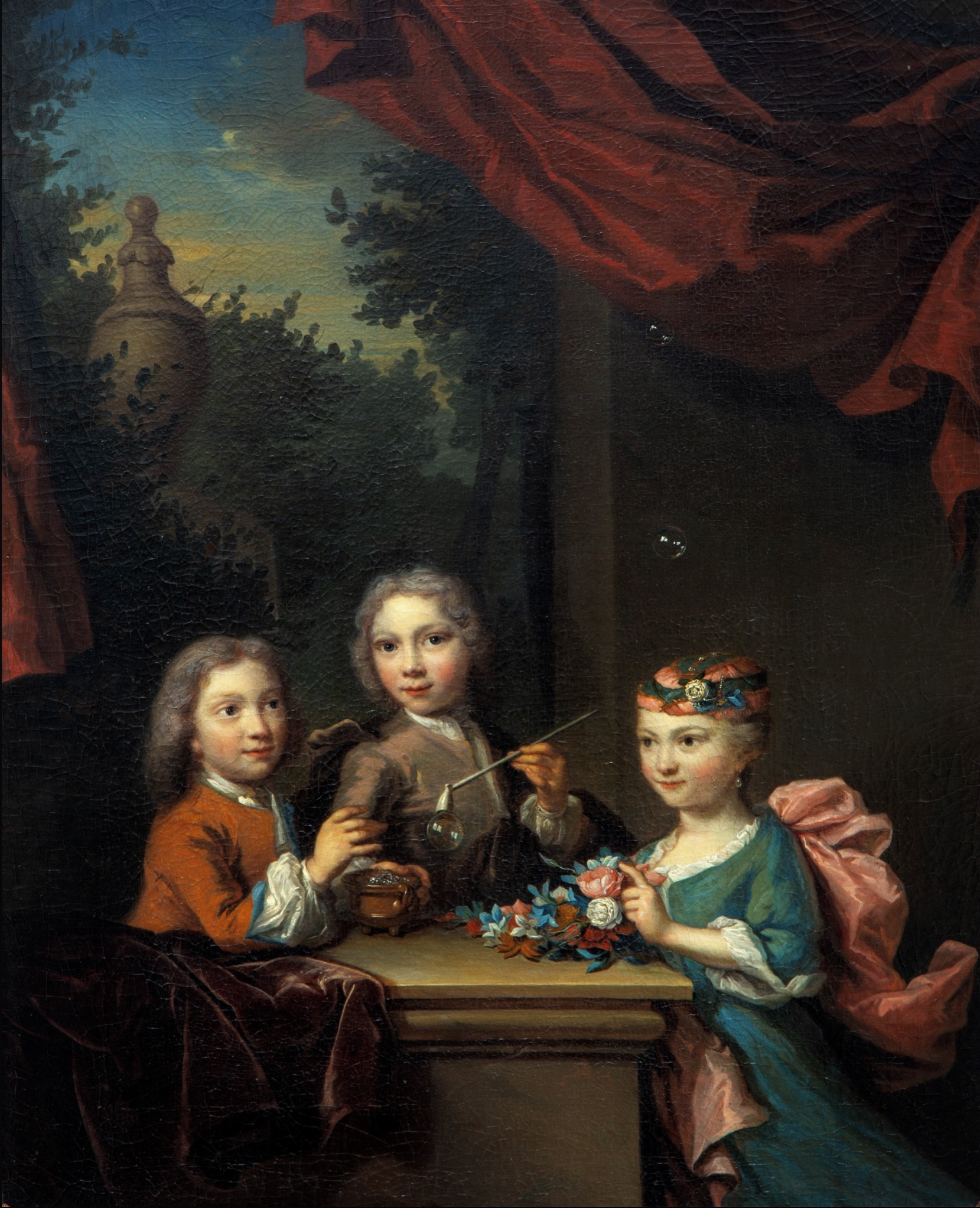
Family portrait of 3 children of the van der Elst family

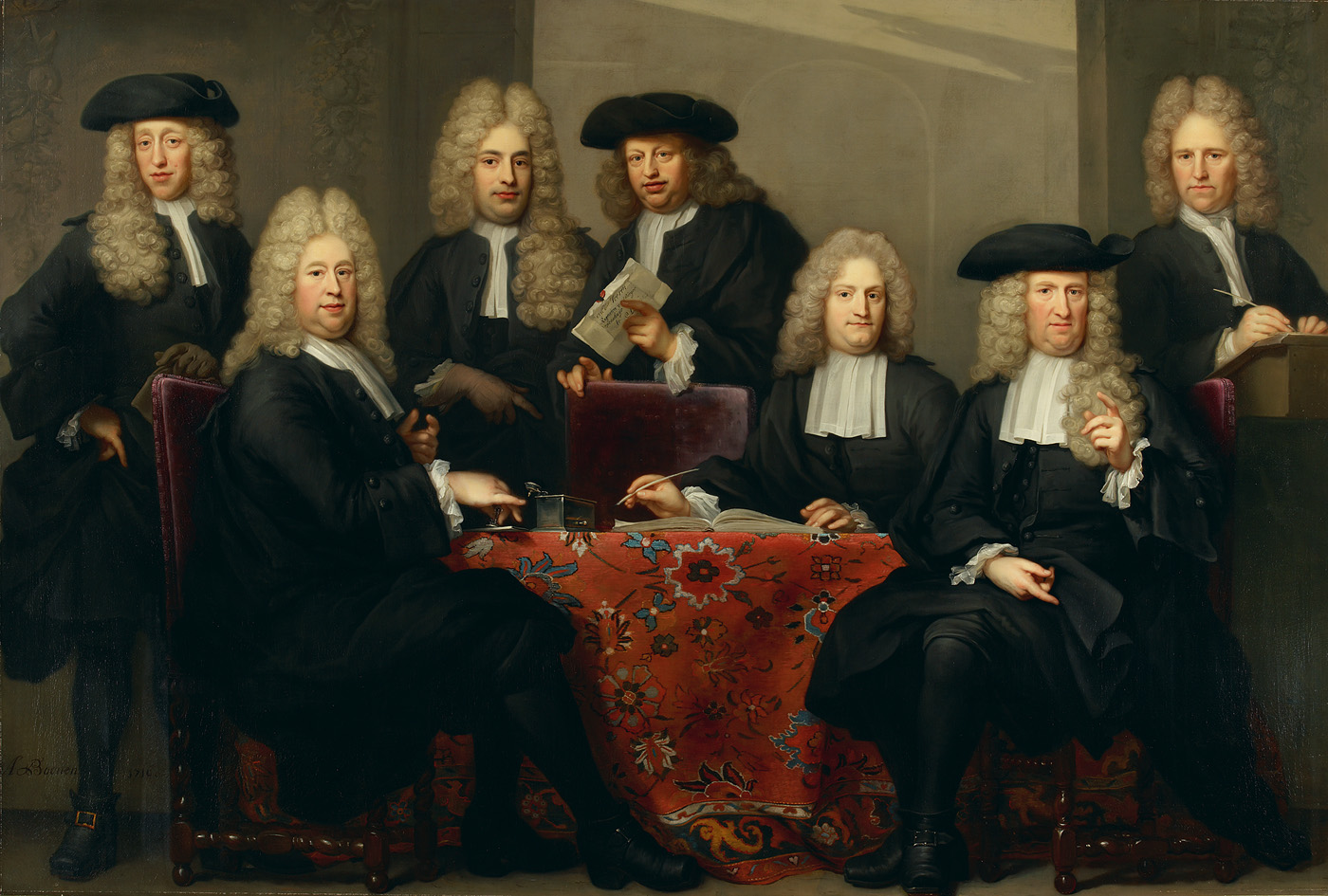
Regents of the Burgerweeshuis (municipal orphanage) in Amsterdam, 1716

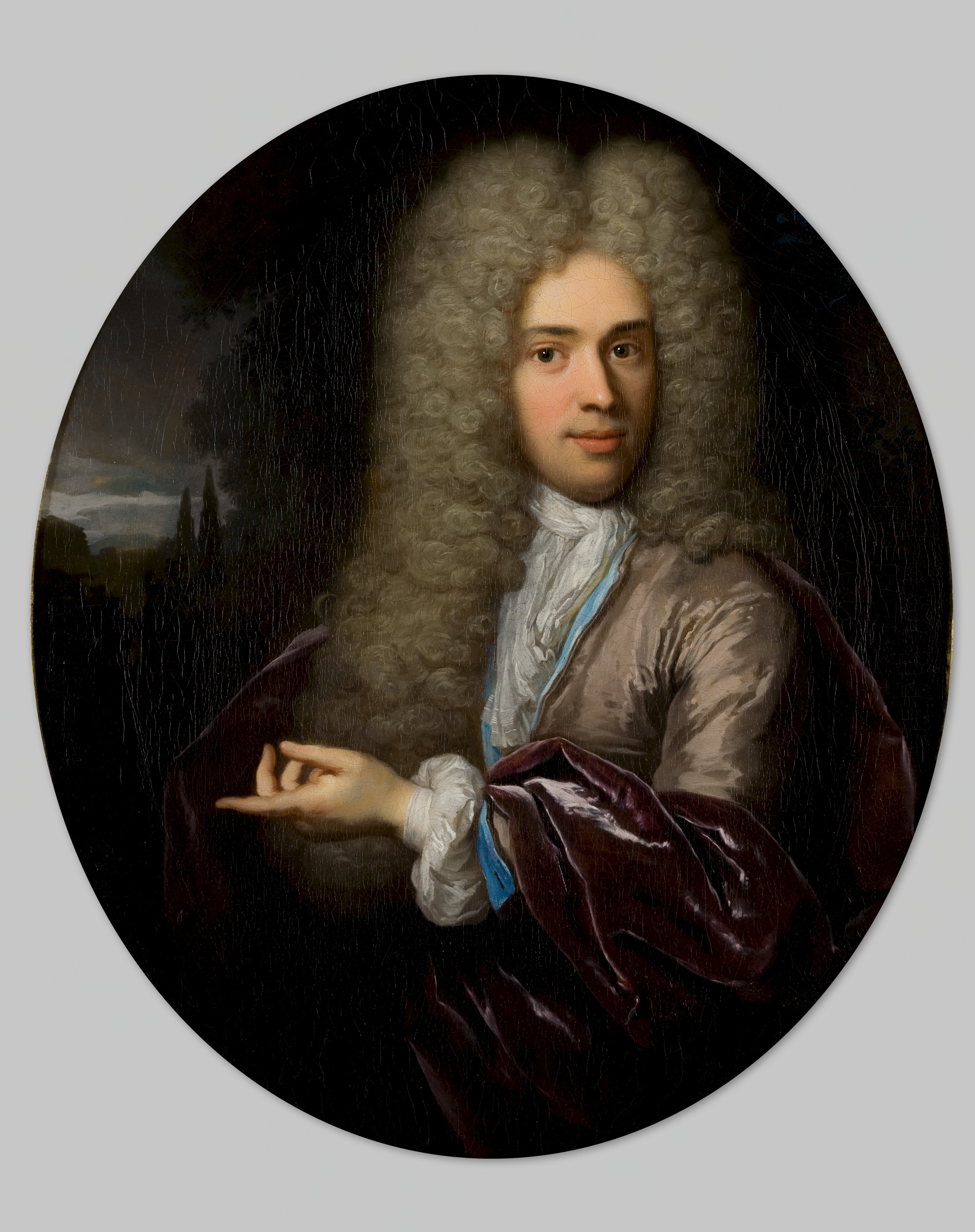
Daniël Deutz by Arnold Boonen

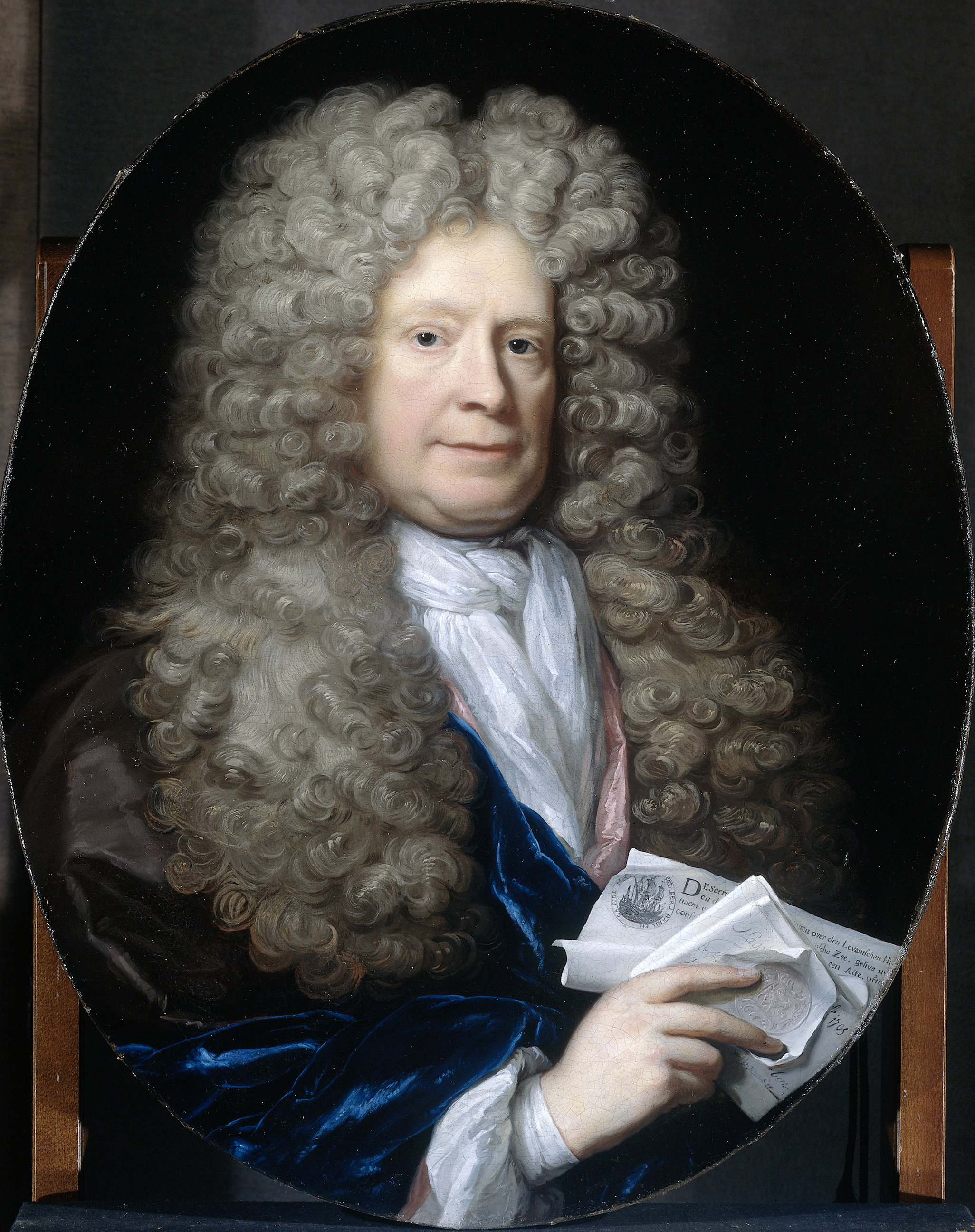
Portrait of Pieter van de Poel, 1700
