= 1940 Southwark Central by-election =

UK Parliamentary by-election

The 1940 Southwark Central by-election was held on 10 February 1940. The by-election was held due to the death of the incumbent Labour MP, Harry Day. It was won by the Labour candidate John Hanbury Martin.

Southwark Central by-election, 1940
Party	Candidate	Votes	%	±%
Labour	John Hanbury Martin	5,285	64.3	+11.0
Anti-War	Charles W. Searson	1,550	18.9	New
National	Violet Van der Elst	1,382	16.8	−29.9
Majority		3,735	45.4	+38.8
Turnout		8,217		
Labour hold		Swing		
