= John Hanbury Martin =

British politician (1890–1983)

John Hanbury Martin (4 April 1890 – 3 February 1983) was a British Labour politician.

Martin was educated at Wellington College and Brasenose College, Oxford, before becoming an author and journalist. During World War I, he served as a captain in the Queen's Westminsters. At the 1931 United Kingdom general election, he stood unsuccessfully for the Labour Party in Great Yarmouth, and from 1934 until 1949, he served on Southwark Borough Council.

In 1934, he married Avice Blanaid Trench, daughter of Herbert Trench, but they were divorced in 1938.

He was elected Member of Parliament (MP) for Southwark Central in 1940, resigning in 1948. In 1951, he married Dorothy Helen Lloyd-Jones.

Parliament of the United Kingdom
Preceded by Harry Day	Member of Parliament for Southwark Central; 1940–1948	Succeeded by Roy Jenkins
