= Southwark Central =

Parliamentary constituency in the United Kingdom, 1918–1950

- Former borough constituency for the House of Commons

1918–1950
- Seats: one
- Created from: Newington West
- Replaced by: Southwark

Southwark (Br [ˈsʌðɨk]) Central was a borough constituency returning a single Member of Parliament to the House of Commons of the Parliament of the United Kingdom through the first past the post voting system. The constituency was a very compact and urban area, and was one of three divisions of the Parliamentary Borough of Southwark, which was identical to the Metropolitan Borough of Southwark, in South London. The creation of the constituency was recommended by the Boundary Commission in a report issued in 1917, and formally created by the Representation of the People Act 1918. It came into existence at the 1918 general election.

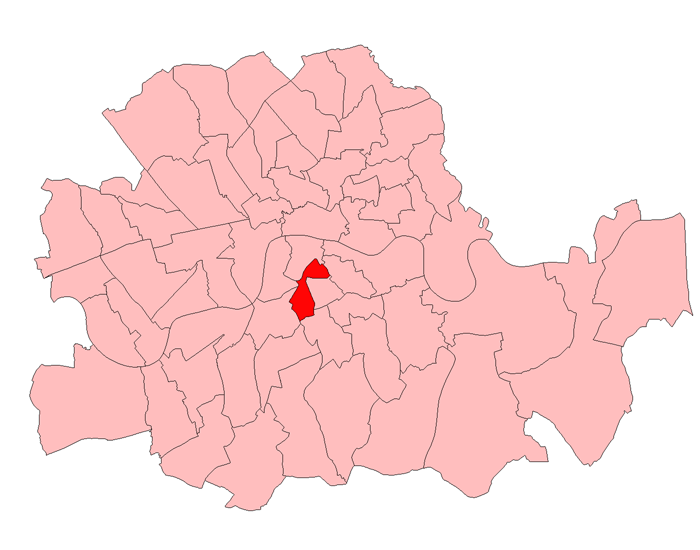
Southwark Central in the Parliamentary County of London

As the borough of Southwark had only 67,279 electors on 15 October 1946, the relevant date for the subsequent Boundary Commission review, the borough was only entitled to a single Member of Parliament. As a consequence Southwark Central was abolished as a separate constituency by the Representation of the People Act 1948, along with its neighbours Southwark North and Southwark South East and went out of existence at the 1950 general election, forming part of the re-established Southwark constituency.

== Boundaries ==
Southwark Metropolitan Borough wards in 1916

When the constituency was created, it was defined to include three whole wards of the Metropolitan Borough of Southwark (St Mary's, St Paul's and Trinity) together with a small section of the St George's ward. This formed an area in two main parts linked by a narrow strip of land around Elephant and Castle. The southern section, between Kennington Park Road and Walworth Road, including the St Mary and St Paul wards, was almost entirely residential. It stretched to Kennington Park and to Avenue Road, being the southern boundary of the borough. Around the Elephant and Castle area the constituency included Newington Butts and the Metropolitan Tabernacle, but at its narrowest point it was only about 100 yards between the western boundary on Newington Causeway and the eastern boundary on the railway line through Elephant & Castle railway station.

North of Elephant and Castle, the constituency turned to the east and included a second area of Newington between New Kent Road and Newington Causeway in the Trinity ward. The southern boundary of this part of the constituency continued along New Kent Road to divide St George's ward along it and Tower Bridge Road up to the borough boundary with Bermondsey. The northern part of Trinity ward, north of Wickham Place, was not included. The constituency's last MP, future Chancellor Roy Jenkins, described it as "postage stamp-sized".

== Members of Parliament ==
Election	Member	Party
1918	James Daniel Gilbert	Coalition Liberal
1922	James Daniel Gilbert	National Liberal
1923	James Daniel Gilbert	Liberal
1924	Harry Day	Labour
1931	Ian Horobin	National
1935	Harry Day	Labour
1940 by-election	John Hanbury Martin	Labour
1948 by-election	Roy Jenkins	Labour
1950	constituency abolished: see Southwark	

== Elections ==
=== Elections in the 1910s ===
1918 general election: Southwark Central
Party		Candidate	Votes	%
C	National Liberal	James Daniel Gilbert	8,060	72.1
	Labour	Leslie Haden-Guest	3,126	27.9
Majority			4,934	44.2
Turnout			11,186	40.4
Registered electors			27,699	
	National Liberal win (new seat)			
C indicates candidate endorsed by the coalition government.

=== Elections in the 1920s ===
1922 general election: Southwark Central
Party	Candidate	Votes	%	±%
National Liberal	James Daniel Gilbert	10,522	65.6	–6.5
Labour	George Dobson Bell	5,522	34.4	+6.5
Majority		5,000	31.2	−13.0
Turnout		16,044		
Registered electors				
National Liberal hold		Swing	–6.5	

1923 general election: Southwark Central
Party	Candidate	Votes	%	±%
Liberal	James Daniel Gilbert	8,676	45.3	−20.3
Labour	Harry Day	6,690	34.9	+0.5
Unionist	Charles Louis Nordon	3,801	19.8	New
Majority		1,986	10.4	−20.8
Turnout		21,167		
Registered electors				
Liberal hold		Swing	–10.4	

1924 general election: Southwark Central
Party	Candidate	Votes	%	±%
Labour	Harry Day	9,199	40.0	+5.1
Liberal	James Daniel Gilbert	7,817	34.1	−11.2
Conservative	Charles Louis Nordon	5,937	25.9	+6.1
Majority		1,382	5.9	N/A
Turnout		22,953		
Registered electors				
Labour gain from Liberal		Swing		

1929 general election: Southwark Central
Party	Candidate	Votes	%	±%
Labour	Harry Day	13,318	52.3	+12.3
Unionist	Edward Keeling	6,256	24.6	−1.3
Liberal	James Robert Want	5,878	23.1	−11.0
Majority		7,062	27.7	+21.8
Turnout		25,452		
Registered electors				
Labour hold		Swing	+6.8	

=== Elections in the 1930s ===
1931 general election: Southwark Central
Party	Candidate	Votes	%	±%
National	Ian Horobin	15,913	65.3	New
Labour	Harry Day	8,466	34.7	−17.6
Majority		7,447	30.6	N/A
Turnout		24,379		
Registered electors				
National gain from Labour		Swing		

1935 general election: Southwark Central
Party	Candidate	Votes	%	±%
Labour	Harry Day	11,098	53.3	+18.6
National Labour	Ernest Stanford	9,735	46.7	−18.6
Majority		1,363	6.6	N/A
Turnout		20,833		
Registered electors				
Labour gain from National		Swing		

=== Elections in the 1940s ===
1940 Southwark Central by-election
Party	Candidate	Votes	%	±%
Labour	John Hanbury Martin	5,285	64.3	+11.0
Anti-War	Charles W. Searson	1,550	18.9	New
National	Violet Van der Elst	1,382	16.8	−29.9
Majority		3,735	45.4	+38.8
Turnout		8,217		
Registered electors				
Labour hold		Swing		

1945 general election: Southwark Central
Party	Candidate	Votes	%	±%
Labour	John Hanbury Martin	9,336	71.9	+18.6
Conservative	William Steward	3,654	28.1	New
Majority		5,682	43.8	+37.2
Turnout		12,990	62.8	
Registered electors				
Labour hold		Swing		

1948 Southwark Central by-election
Party	Candidate	Votes	%	±%
Labour	Roy Jenkins	8,744	65.4	−6.5
Conservative	James Greenwood (MP)	4,623	34.6	+6.5
Majority		4,121	30.8	−13.0
Turnout		13,367		
Registered electors				
Labour hold		Swing		

== Sources ==
- Leigh Rayment's Historical List of MPs – Constituencies beginning with "S" (part 4)
