= James Margach =

20th-century British political journalist

James Dunbar Margach CBE (1910 – 23 March 1979) was a British journalist.

He was born in Elgin, Scotland and began his career in journalism, aged 22, as the Westminster correspondent for the Aberdeen Free Press and Journal. In this role he got to know Ramsay MacDonald and Stanley Baldwin, both of whom told him sensitive political information.

He later became the political correspondent for The Sunday Times, retiring in 1976. In a career spanning more than 40 years Margach knew 11 Prime Ministers and his unopinionated journalism helped generations of politicians from all parties to entrust him with their confidences; he was friends both with the far-left MP James Maxton and the Conservative peer Lord Swinton. Shortly before he died he wrote his memoirs The Abuse of Power which, as Ferdinand Mount noted, "portrays most of the prime ministers he was intimate with as vain, bullying, deceitful, paranoiac, unscrupulous and vengeful. But what is so strange is that for virtually half his life he lived with these monsters and never wrote a thing in his newspaper about what they were really like".

He was appointed a Commander of the Order of the British Empire in the 1969 Birthday Honours.

== Works ==
- How Parliament Works (London: Tom Stacey, 1972).
- The Abuse of Power: The War between Downing Street and the Media from Lloyd George to James Callaghan (London: Allen Lane, 1978).
- The Anatomy of Power: An Enquiry into the Personality of Leadership (London: Allen Lane, 1979).
