= Burnham (surname) =

Burnham is a surname of English origin.

== Notable people ==
- Andrew Burnham (priest) (born 1948), Church of England Bishop
- Andy Burnham (born 1970), current Prime Minister of the United Kingdom (leader of the Labour Party from July 2026)
- Bo Burnham (born 1990), American comedian, musician, and filmmaker
- Charles Burnham (musician) (born 1950), American musician
- Chris Burnham, American comic book artist
- Clara Louise Burnham (1854–1927), American novelist
- Claudine Burnham, American politician from New Hampshire
- Clark Burnham (1802–1871), American politician from New York
- Daniel Burnham (1846–1912), American architect and urban planner
- Daniel F. Burnham (1864–1957), American politician from Wisconsin
- David Burnham (novelist) (1907–1974), American novelist
- Edward Burnham (1916–2015), English actor
- Edwin Otway Burnham (1824–1873), American minister
- Eleanor Burnham, Welsh politician
- Enid, Lady Burnham, British-Argentinian Girl Guide scout
- Forbes Burnham (1923–1985), Guyanese politician and leader of Guyana
- Frederick K. Burnham, American motorboat racer
- Frederick Russell Burnham (1861–1947), American scout and adventurer
- George Burnham (1868–1939), American banker and politician from California
- Gracia Burnham (born 1959), American missionary
- Helen Burnham (born 1956), English swimmer
- Harry Burnham (1875–1951), American politician from Nebraska
- Henry E. Burnham (1844–1917), American politician from New Hampshire
- Howard Burnham (1870–1917), American spy for France during World War I
- Howard Mather Burnham (1842–1863), Union first lieutenant in the American Civil War
- Hugo Burnham (born 1956), English musician
- Iris Burnham, American educator
- James Burnham (1905–1987), American political theorist
- Jeremy Burnham, English actor and screenwriter
- Joshua Burnham (born 2004), American football player
- Kevin Burnham (1956–2020), American sailor
- Lem Burnham (born 1947), American football player
- Linda Burnham (born 1948), American women's rights activist
- Oscar Burnham (born 1999), French para-alpine skier
- Paul Burnham, English businessman and cricket supporter
- Robert Burnham Jr. (1931–1993), American astronomer
- Roger Noble Burnham (1876–1962), American sculptor
- Sherburne Wesley Burnham (1838–1921), American astronomer
- Thomas Burnham (1617–1688), English-born American lawyer and landowner
- Van Burnham (born 1971), American writer, designer, producer, and curator
- Walter Dean Burnham (1930–2022), American academic and expert on U.S. elections and voting patterns
- Watch Burnham (1860–1902), American baseball umpire and manager
- Zacheus Burnham (1777–1857), Canadian farmer, judge, and politician from Upper Canada

== In fiction ==
- Lester Burnham, the main character in the 1999 film American Beauty
- Michael Burnham, a character in the 2017 television series Star Trek: Discovery, played by Sonequa Martin-Green

== See also ==
- Burnham (disambiguation), a disambiguation page
- Baron Burnham, a title in the Peerage of the UK
