= Burnham =

Burnham may refer to:

== People ==
- Burnham (surname), includes a list of people with the name
  - Andy Burnham, current Prime Minister of the United Kingdom
- Baron Burnham, a title in the Peerage of the United Kingdom

== Places ==
=== Canada ===
- Burnham, Saskatchewan

=== England ===
- Burnham, Buckinghamshire
  - Burnham Beeches, a nature reserve
  - Burnham railway station
  - Burnham Grammar School
  - East Burnham, a hamlet
- Burnham-on-Crouch, Essex
- Burnham Green, Hertfordshire, location of The White Horse
- Burnham, Lincolnshire
  - High Burnham, Isle of Axholme, Lincolnshire
  - Low Burnham, Isle of Axholme, Lincolnshire
- Burnham Market, Norfolk
- Norfolk Burnhams
- Burnham-on-Sea, Somerset

=== New Zealand ===
- Burnham, New Zealand army base

=== United States ===
- Burnham, Illinois
- Burnham, Maine
- Burnham, Missouri
- Burnham, Pennsylvania
- Mount Burnham, a peak along the San Gabriel Mountains in California

=== Philippines ===
- Burnham Park, a park in Baguio City

== Other uses ==
- Burnham (band), a Vermont-based Pop-Rock band
- Burnham (crater), on the Moon
- Burnham Institute for Medical Research, a nonprofit medical research institute
- J.W. Burnham House, historic house in Louisiana, USA
- Operation Burnham, a 2010 military action in Afghanistan
- Burnham F.C. football team
