= Senator Burnham (disambiguation) =

Henry E. Burnham (1844–1917) was a U.S. Senator from New Hampshire from 1901 to 1913. Senator Burnham may also refer to:

- Alfred A. Burnham (1819–1879), Connecticut State Senate
- Clark Burnham (1802–1871), New York State Senate
- Edward Goodwin Burnham (1827–1908), Connecticut State Senate
- Harry Burnham (1875–1951), Nebraska State Senate
