= John le Sage =

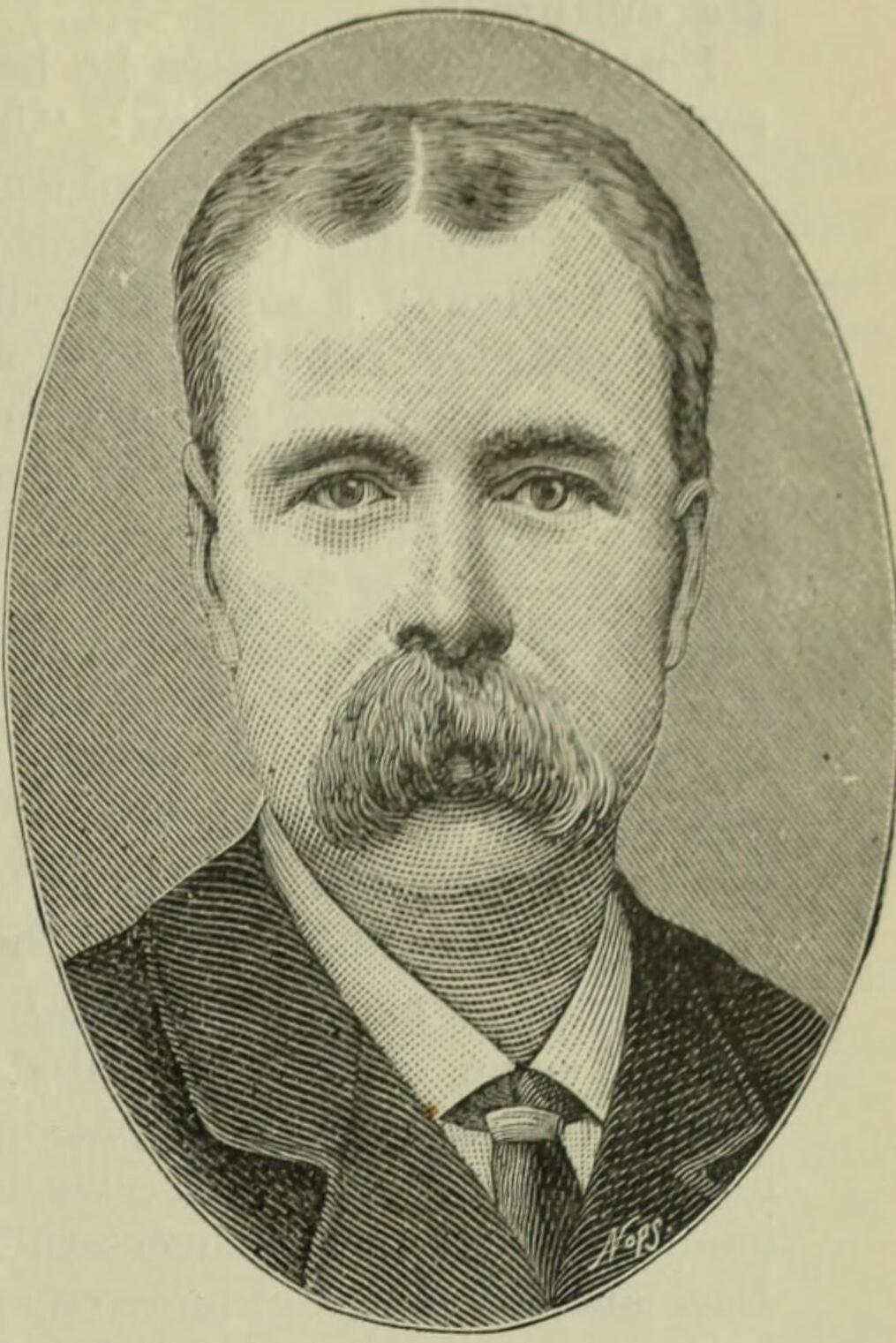
- Born: John Merry Sage; 23 April 1837; Clifton, Bristol, England
- Died: 1 January 1926 (aged 88); Fulham, London, England
- Occupations: Journalist, editor
- Employer: The Daily Telegraph
- Spouses: Ellen Augusta Kent (m. 1862–1865) Clara Ellen Scott (m. 1868–1873) Elizabeth Lord (m. 1874–1926)

Sir John Merry le Sage (23 April 1837 – 1 January 1926), was a British journalist and newspaper editor.

== Biography ==
Born in Clifton, Bristol, Le Sage was the son of John Sage and his wife Elizabeth, née Godfrey; Le Sage would adopt the "Le" for his last name during middle age. He began his career in journalism when he was employed as a reporter for The Torquay Directory and South Devon Journal, later working for the Western Morning News. In 1863, he obtained a position with The Daily Telegraph in London, beginning an association with the paper that would last for sixty years.

Le Sage worked primarily as a foreign correspondent. Though not regarded as a great writer, he was best known for providing the first reports of the German troops marching into Paris during the Franco-Prussian War in 1871. He was also present during the period of the Paris Commune, as well as the coronation of Tsar Alexander III. He enjoyed a good relationship with first Joseph Moses Levy and then his son Edward Levy-Lawson, successive owners of the Daily Telegraph. When the senior Levy died, Le Sage was named as editor, though Levy-Lawson exercised firm control over the newspaper until he became Baron Burnham in 1903. As editor, Le Sage continued the traditions laid out by his predecessors, focusing on the middle class reader and ignoring criticism of his practices.

Though Le Sage proved a successful editor, by the early 20th century he was having difficulties keeping up with changes in the journalistic profession. Hampered by his age and an unwillingness to delegate responsibility, he nonetheless continued on as editor and was knighted in 1918 in recognition for his services to journalism. Le Sage retired from his post in June 1923 and died on New Year's Day, 1926, at his home in Fulham.

Media offices
Preceded by Edwin Arnold	Editor of The Daily Telegraph; 1888–1923	Succeeded by Frederick Miller
