= USS Dixie =

USS Dixie has been the name of more than one United States Navy ship, and may refer to:

- USS Dixie (1893), a ship in commission as an auxiliary cruiser from 1898 to 1899, as a training ship from 1899 to 1902, as a transport from 1903 to 1905 and from 1906 to 1907, and as a destroyer tender from 1909 to 1922
- USS Dixie (AD-14), a destroyer tender in commission from 1940 to 1982

It may also refer to:

- USS Dixie III (SP-701), later USS SP-701, a patrol boat in commission from 1917 to 1919
