= Burnhamia =

Burnhamia may refer to:

- 834 Burnhamia, an asteroid
- Burnhamia, an extinct genus of devil rays
