= Enid, Lady Burnham =

Enid, Lady Burnham CBE
- Enid, Lady Burnham from a 1971 newspaper
- Born: Marie Enid Robson; 27 May 1894; Buenos Aires, Argentina
- Died: 29 July 1979 (aged 85); Beaconsfield, Buckinghamshire, England
- Other name: Lady B
- Office: Girl Guide Chief Commissioner for England
- Spouse: Edward Lawson, 4th Baron Burnham (m. 1920)

The Rt. Hon. Enid Lawson, Baroness Burnham CBE (née Marie Enid Robson; 27 May 1894 – 29 July 1979) served as the Girl Guide Chief Commissioner for England. She was also president of the Buckinghamshire Red Cross Society for 28 years, president of the Federation of Women's Institutes for five years and also vice-president of the Council for the Preservation of Rural England.

== Early life and personal life ==
She was born in Buenos Aires, the only daughter of Hugh Scott Robson, a British-Argentinian polo player, and his wife, Lucy Grigg. She had an older brother, Noel Robson. The family moved back to England in February 1901 and lived with her maternal grandparents. She was educated at Heathfield School in Berkshire. On 28 January 1920, she married Edward Lawson, 4th Baron Burnham. They had two sons and a daughter:

- William Edward Harley Lawson, 5th Baron Burnham (1920–1993)
- Hon Lucia Edith Lawson (29 August 1922 – 24 July 2011), married Roger Marquis, 2nd Earl of Woolton, divorced 1953. Married John William Whitehead in 1966.
- Hugh John Frederick Lawson, 6th Baron Burnham (1931–2005)

== Honours ==
In 1952 Burnham was a recipient of the Silver Fish Award, the highest adult award in Girlguiding. She was appointed Commander of the Order of the British Empire (CBE) in 1957.
