= Hugh Lawson =

Hugh Lawson may refer to:

- Hugh Lawson (British politician) (1912–1997), British Common Wealth Party politician, Member of Parliament 1944–45
- Hugh Lawson, 6th Baron Burnham (1931–2005), British newspaper executive
- Hugh Lawson (jazz pianist) (1935–1997), American jazz pianist
- Hugh Lawson (judge) (born 1941), U.S. federal judge
