= Frederick Burnham =

Frederick Burnham may refer to:

- Frederick K. Burnham, American motorboat racer, winner of the 1910 APBA Challenge Cup
- Frederick Russell Burnham (1861–1947), American scout and world traveling adventurer
- Frederick Ernest Burnham (1847–??), lawyer and politician in Manitoba, Canada
