= Hall Barn =

Country house in Beaconsfield, Buckinghamshire, England

Coordinates: 51.5940°N 0.6393°W

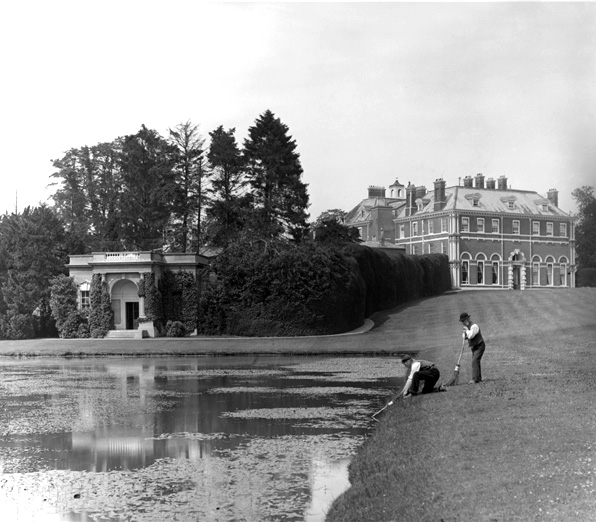
Hall Barn and boathouse from Country Life magazine, 1898

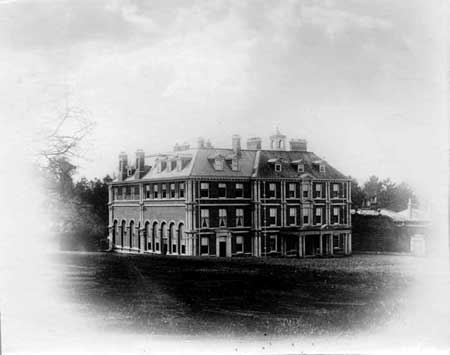
Hall Barn, around 1900

Hall Barn is a historic country house located in Beaconsfield, South Bucks district, in Buckinghamshire, England.

== History ==
The Hall Barn estate was bought by Anne Waller in 1624. The house was built in the late-17th century by her son Edmund Waller, a poet and Member of Parliament at various times between 1624 and 1679. His grandson added the south wing. The estate was sold by his family in 1832 to Sir Gore Ouseley, 1st Baronet, who rebuilt the southern facade and was High Sheriff of Buckinghamshire for 1835.

Edward Levy-Lawson, 1st Baron Burnham bought the estate in 1880 and made a number of renovations and improvements, and in the early 21st century, the estate remained under the management Hugh Lawson, 6th Baron Burnham. Since his death it has been the home of his sister, Jenefer Farncombe (nee Lawson).

There were royal visits to the estate, including from the Duke of Cambridge in November 1902, and from King Edward VII and the Prince of Wales (later King George V) for a shooting party in January 1903. The Princess Royal "took the salute" at Hall Barn in the 1940s at the Girl Guide County Rally.

During the Second World War, the house was used as a hospital supplies unit. In November 1946, the Hall Barn Estate was reported in Tatler as being the "lovely home" and venue for the wedding reception for extended family and friends of the newly-wed daughter of the "charming" Lord and Lady Burnham.

In the late 1960s, Hall Barn was substantially remodelled by the noted neo-classical architect Tom Bird (of Bird & Tyler Associates), with work completed in 1972. The Edwardian library and ballroom, which Lord Burnham considered ugly and difficult to heat (and which had unbalanced the late 17th century design), were pulled down, and a new south and east elevation created, using stone dressings and carved capitals from the demolished extensions. Despite the catalogue to the 1974 V&A exhibition 'The Destruction of the Country House' listing Hall Barn as 'partially destroyed', the remodelling returned the house to its Queen Anne core and saved Hall Barn from total destruction.

Hall Barn is listed Grade II* on the National Heritage List for England, and its landscaped park and gardens are also Grade II listed on the Register of Historic Parks and Gardens. The boathouse, the obelisk, and the "Temple of Venus" pavilion on the estate all date to the 18th century and are also listed as Grade II*.

== Filming location ==
Hall Barn has been used as a filming location for various films and series. In Gosford Park (2001) the opening sequence outside Lady Trentham's home was shot there, and the temple used as the scene for lunch after the shoot. Midsomer Murders Season 7, Episode 4 (2004) "Sins of Commission", prominently features the black gatehouse to Hall Barn. It featured in the series Downton Abbey as Loxley House, the home of Sir Anthony Strallan. The location was also used in the 1981 Oscar-winning film Chariots of Fire as the home of the composite character Lord Andrew Lindsay, who memorably practiced his hurdling skills on the lawn by perching filled champagne glasses on each hurdle to determine if he'd touched the hurdles or not on each jump. Hall Barn was also featured in the mini-series Sense and Sensibility as Delaford House, Call the Midwife (2012 season 1, episode 5) and Black Beauty. It featured as the manor-house of Råbäck in Vestergothland in Sweden in Count Magnus (2022).
