= Frederick Miller (British journalist) =

- Born: 1863; Dundee, Scotland
- Died: 6 November 1924
- Education: High School of Dundee
- Alma mater: University of Edinburgh
- Employer(s): The Scotsman; The Daily Telegraph

Frederick Miller (1863 – 6 November 1924) was a British journalist, who briefly became editor of The Daily Telegraph from the year 1923 to 1924.

== Biography ==
Miller was born in Dundee. He attended the High School of Dundee and the University of Edinburgh, and after graduating joined The Scotsman. Within a matter of weeks, he was recommended for the post of assistant sub-editor of the Telegraph, beginning an association with the newspaper of over forty years.

In 1885, he was appointed chief sub-editor, but a golf accident that caused him to lose his eye led to his transferral to outdoor duty as a reporter for some months. In 1900, he was appointed an assistant to the editor, Sir John le Sage, later becoming his chief assistant. Taking the position of assistant editor in 1914, he went to Paris soon after the outbreak of the First World War to organise the Telegraph's reporting.

In June 1923, Sir John retired after forty years at the helm, and Miller succeeded him as editor. However, little more than 15 months later, he died suddenly, on 6 November 1924.

Media offices
Preceded by John le Sage	Editor of The Daily Telegraph; 1923–1924	Succeeded by Arthur Watson
