= Arthur B. Sleigh =

Canadian-born British Army officer and travel writer

Colonel Arthur B. Sleigh, also known as Burrowes Willcocks Arthur Sleigh (c. 1821, Montreal – 1869, Chelsea), was a British Army officer, travel writer and the original founder of the British newspaper The Daily Telegraph.

Sleigh founded The Daily Telegraph in 1855 to air a personal grievance against Prince George, Duke of Cambridge, but its first issue was not a success and Sleigh was soon forced to sell the paper to his publisher, Joseph Moses Levy.

He was the promoter of the British Columbia Overland Transit Company.

== Works ==
Sleigh was the author of:

- The Outcast Prophet (1847)
- Pine Forests and Hackmatack Clearings (1853)

== Notes and references ==
- P B Waite. "Sleigh, Burrows Wilcocks Arthur". Dictionary of Canadian Biography. University of Toronto Press. Toronto and Buffalo. 1976. Volume 9. Pages 723 and 724.
- Norah Story. "Burrows Willcocks Arthur Sleigh". The Oxford Companion to Canadian History and Literature. Oxford University Press. Toronto. London. New York. 1967. Reprinted with corrections. 1968. Page 767.
- Frederic Boase. "Sleigh, Burrowes Willcocks Arthur". Modern English Biography. 1901. Volume 3. Column 604.
- "B. W. A. Sleigh: Introduction by P. B. Waite" (1962) 42 The Dalhousie Review 55
- "Lieut.-Col. B. W. A. Sleigh" (1869) 1 The Register and Magazine of Biography 471 to 472
- Brian Tennyson. "1853: B W A Sleigh". Impressions of Cape Breton. Cape Breton University Press. 1986. Page 127.
- Dennis Griffiths. "Colonel Sleigh and The Telegraph". Fleet Street: Five Hundred Years of the Press. British Library. 2006. Page 94 et seq.
- Frances Elma Gillespie. Labor and Politics in England. 1850-1867. Octagon Books. 1966. Page 124.
- Goodday v Sleigh (1854) 24 Law Times Reports 121
- In re BWA Sleigh (1857) 2 Solicitors' Journal & Reporter 44
