= Diane Willman =

Australian news journalist and foreign correspondent

- Born: Diane Carolyn Willman; 4 October 1943 (age 82); Sydney, New South Wales, Australia

Diane Carolyn Willman (born 4 October 1943) is a former Australian journalist, who became well known to both Australian and Canadian audiences in the 1970s through her work with the Australian Broadcasting Corporation (ABC) and the Canadian Broadcasting Corporation (CBC) covering the Lebanese Civil War.

== Early life ==
Diane Carolyn Willman was born on 4 October 1943 in what was then Fairlight Private Hospital on Sydney's Northern Beaches to Hilda (née Wachsmann) and Mervyn Willman, a Flight Lieutenant with the R.A.A.F..

Her younger sister is Vicki Willman, who would go on to skipper the first all-female crew in the Sydney to Hobart Yacht Race in 1975.

The Willman family resided in the suburb of Balgowlah on Sydney's Northern Beaches. As a young girl listening to Superman radio serials, she became intrigued by the character of Lois Lane. "With great decision, at about the age of five I decided I wanted to be like Lois Lane and be a reporter", Willman said later.

Willman's father, who after the war became a barrister, wanted Willman to follow in his footsteps. "Both my parents were very much against me being a reporter. They thought it wasn't lady-like."

== Career ==
Willman began her journalism career at The Daily Telegraph, before joining the ABC in 1964.

Having worked in the ABC's radio newsroom for a number of years, Willman asked to be posted overseas as a Foreign Correspondent. The ABC refused on account of her gender. "I was told quite clearly that because I was female they were not going to send me overseas and put me in one of their overseas offices", recalled Willman years later. "The only way to do it was go freelance, so I did. I taught myself how to play the stock market to be able to fund a year away."

She travelled to India in 1968 where she spent a year freelancing, before relocating to Lebanon in 1969, only months after the Israeli attack on Beirut International Airport. Based in Beirut, Willman began filing radio reports for the Canadian Broadcasting Corporation (CBC), and various American networks. The ABC, Willman's previous Australian employer, who didn't have a correspondent at that time in Beirut, also began taking Willman's stories as conflict in the region began escalating with the relocation of the Palestinian Liberation Organization to Lebanon from Jordan.

Throughout the 1970s, Willman's war reporting was frequently heard on the ABC's radio current affairs programs AM and PM, and she became widely known to audiences as fighting erupted between the Lebanese Christian militias and Palestinian insurgents, resulting in a violent civil war throughout the region.

Willman was noted for her third-person accounting of events, as well as compelling first-person anecdotes of what she called, 'life under siege'. Her baby son, Tarek, could often be heard in the background of a number of her reports. Willman later told of having to nurse Tarek while filing despatches and live broadcasts for AM, swiftly moving from left to right breast without missing a syllable, "fortunately I don't think any listeners knew they were getting breast-fed AM."

She and her infant son were among hundreds evacuated from Lebanon by the United States to Athens in July, 1976 during a period of increasing violence. Willman travelled on to Australia to be reunited with family, but would return to Lebanon shortly thereafter.

As the conflict became more volatile, Willman felt increasingly that she and her family would be in danger the longer she stayed. "Your number is eventually up, and one day I suddenly got the feeling that if we weren't out in three weeks, the number would be up." Returning to Australia, she became host of the ABC's Correspondent's Report in 1978, and would occasionally fill in as compere of AM.

During the 1980s, Willman joined the newsroom of the Special Broadcasting Service (SBS). In 1985, she became a reporter and producer for Dateline, a new weekly current affairs program which SBS had established the previous year, and was largely focused on international events, often in developing or warring nations. Following the 1986 United States bombing of Libya, Willman was one of the few journalists permitted entry into the Libyan capital of Tripoli, delivering a world exclusive report for Dateline.

In 1988, she was appointed as Dateline's Executive Producer, but departed the program in 1989 to head up Asia Report, a new SBS-produced current affairs program which explored political, economic and social trends in Asian countries. The program was an outlier in Australian broadcasting at the time. An early episode which included a controversial report on Chinese repression in Tibet, filed only weeks before the Tiananmen Square massacre, provoked the ire of Chinese embassy officials in Australia. "We are very grateful to the Chinese for jumping up and down and demanding that the Government and the network stop us broadcasting that report", Willman told The Sydney Morning Herald in response to the controversy. "You dream of something happening that will put a program like this in the daily newspapers and bring it to the attention of a broad audience."

Leaving television in the 1990s, Willman became the national editor of SBS Radio, overseeing all output for the broadcaster's radio news division. She held the role until her retirement in 2007.

== Personal life ==
While in Beirut, Willman met Jihad Bisher, a Palestinian working for the United Nations in 1972. The pair married within six months of meeting and had a son, Tarek in 1975. Retired, she resides on Sydney's Northern Beaches.
