= 834 Burnhamia =

Large background asteroid

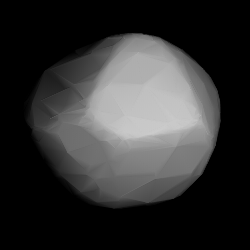
- Shape of Burnhamia from modeled lightcurve

Discovery
- Discovered by: M. F. Wolf
- Discovery site: Heidelberg Obs.
- Discovery date: 20 September 1916

Designations
- Pronunciation: /bərnˈheɪmiə/
- Named after: Sherburne Wesley Burnham (American astronomer)
- Alternative designations: A916 SG · 1959 CA; 1972 JE · A905 UM; 1916 AD · 1905 UM
- Minor planet category: main-belt · (outer); background

Orbital characteristics
- Epoch 31 May 2020 (JD 2459000.5)
- Uncertainty parameter 0
- Observation arc: 114.27 yr (41,737 d)
- Aphelion: 3.8256 AU
- Perihelion: 2.5443 AU
- Semi-major axis: 3.1849 AU
- Eccentricity: 0.2012
- Orbital period (sidereal): 5.68 yr (2,076 d)
- Mean anomaly: 207.71°
- Mean motion: 0° 10^{m} 24.24^{s} / day
- Inclination: 3.9779°
- Longitude of ascending node: 182.68°
- Argument of perihelion: 91.320°

Physical characteristics
- Mean diameter: 61.278±0.303 km; 61.44±2.13 km; 66.65±2.4 km
- Synodic rotation period: 13.875±0.001 h
- Geometric albedo: 0.0698±0.005; 0.071±0.008; 0.082±0.007
- Spectral type: Tholen = GS: X (S3OS2); B–V = 0.752±0.020; U–B = 0.472±0.047
- Absolute magnitude (H): 9.5

834 Burnhamia (prov. designation: A916 SG or 1916 AD) is a large background asteroid, approximately 61 kilometers (38 miles) in diameter, that is located in the outer region of the asteroid belt. It was discovered on 20 September 1916, by German astronomer Max Wolf at the Heidelberg Observatory in southwest Germany. The X-type asteroid (GS) has a rotation period of 13.9 hours. It was named after American astronomer Sherburne Wesley Burnham (1838–1921).

== Orbit and classification ==
Burnhamia is a non-family asteroid of the main belt's background population when applying the hierarchical clustering method to its proper orbital elements. It orbits the Sun in the outer main-belt at a distance of 2.5–3.8 AU once every 5 years and 8 months (2,076 days; semi-major axis of 3.18 AU). Its orbit has an eccentricity of 0.20 and an inclination of 4° with respect to the ecliptic. The asteroid's observation arc begins with its first observation as A905 UM at Heidelberg Observatory on 26 October 1905, almost 11 years prior to its official discovery observation.

== Naming ==
This minor planet was named after Sherburne Wesley Burnham (1838–1921), American astronomer who discovered many visual binary stars and is known for his Burnham Double Star Catalogue (BDS), a catalogue of double stars seen in the Northern Hemisphere, which was published in two parts by the Carnegie Institution of Washington in 1906. Burnham observed from the Chicago (1877), Lick (1888) and Yerkes (1897) observatories. The naming was published in the journal Astronomische Nachrichten in 1921 (AN 214, 69), and was also mentioned in The Names of the Minor Planets by Paul Herget in 1955 (H 82). The lunar crater Burnham is also named in his honor.

== Physical characteristics ==
In the Tholen classification, Burnhamia is closest to a G-type asteroid and somewhat similar to a common stony S-type asteroid, while In ioth the Tholen- and SMASS-like taxonomy of the Small Solar System Objects Spectroscopic Survey (S3OS2), Burnhamia is an X-type asteroid.

=== Rotation period ===
In October 2006, a rotational lightcurve of Burnhamia was obtained from photometric observations by Robert Buchheim at the Altimira Observatory (G76) in California. Lightcurve analysis gave a well-defined rotation period of 13.875±0.001 hours with a brightness variation of 0.20±0.02 magnitude (U=3). The result supersedes previous observations by French amateur astronomer Laurent Bernasconi from May 2005, with a period of 13.9±0.03 hours with an amplitude of 0.15±0.01 magnitude (U=2+), and from October 2006, that gave a period of 13.85±0.03 hours and an amplitude of 0.22±0.02 magnitude (U=3−).

=== Diameter and albedo ===
According to the surveys carried out by the NEOWISE mission of NASA's Wide-field Infrared Survey Explorer (WISE), the Japanese Akari satellite, and the Infrared Astronomical Satellite IRAS, Burnhamia measures (61.278±0.303), (61.44±2.13) and (66.65±2.4) kilometers in diameter and its surface has an albedo of (0.071±0.008), (0.082±0.007) and (0.0698±0.005), respectively. The Collaborative Asteroid Lightcurve Link derives an albedo of 0.0602 and a diameter of 66.64 kilometers based on an absolute magnitude of 9.55. The WISE team also published an alternative mean-diameter of (66.151±1.727 km) with corresponding albedos of (0.0611±0.0082). Two asteroid occultations of Burnhamia September 2013 and January 2014, gave both a best-fit ellipse dimension of (61.0 km × 61.0 km). These timed observations are taken when the asteroid passes in front of a distant star.
