= Baron Burnham =

Barony in the Peerage of the United Kingdom

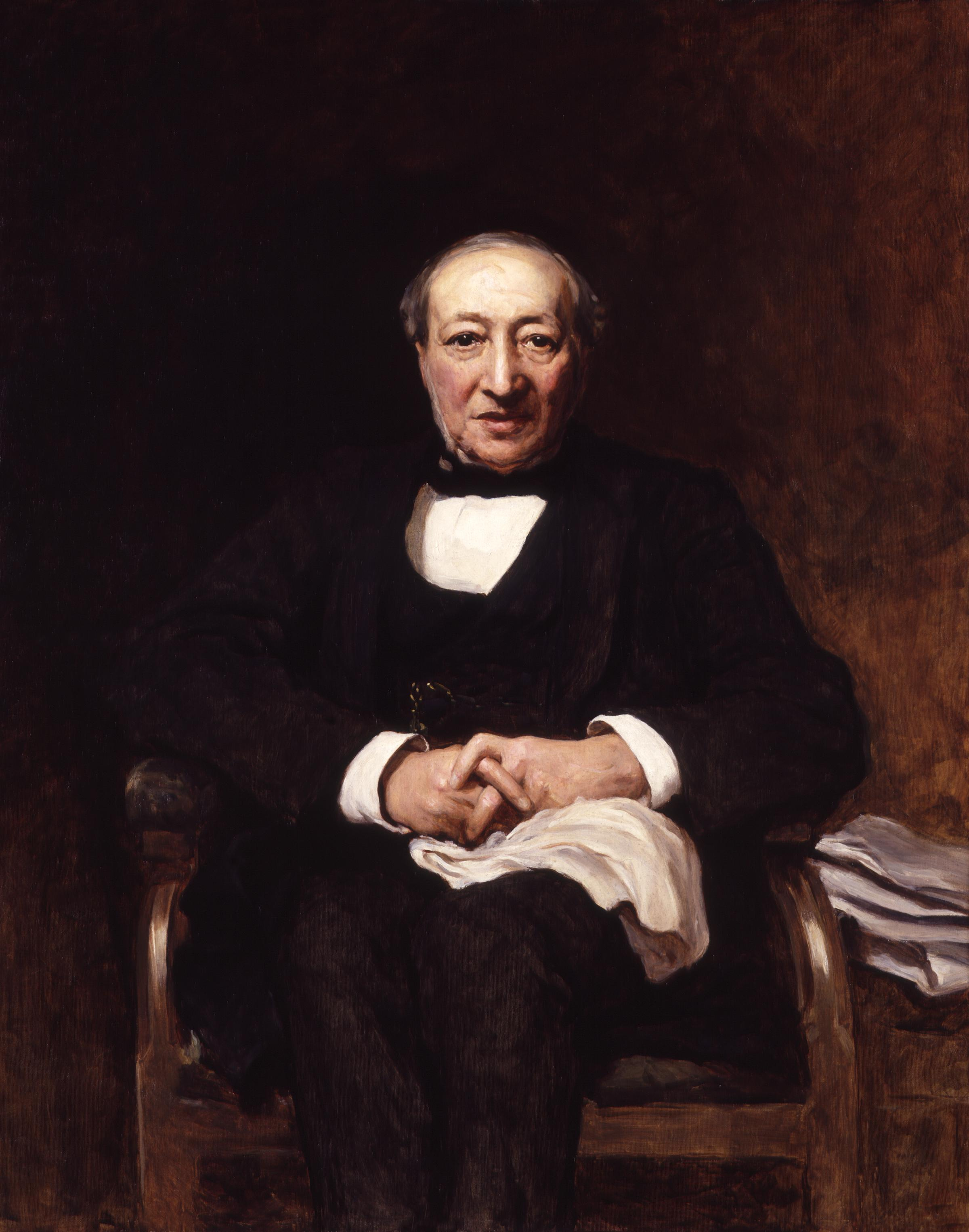
Joseph Moses Levy, ancestor of the Barons Burnham, by Hubert von Herkomer, exhibited 1888

Escutcheon of the Levy-Lawson baronets

Arms of the Barons Burnham

Baron Burnham, of Hall Barn in the Parish of Beaconsfield in the County of Buckingham, is a title in the Peerage of the United Kingdom. It was created on 31 July 1903 for the influential newspaper magnate Sir Edward Levy-Lawson, 1st Baronet, owner of The Daily Telegraph. He had already been created a Baronet, of Hall Barn in The Parish of Beaconsfield in the County of Buckingham and of Peterborough Court in the City of London, in the Baronetage of the United Kingdom on 13 October 1892. Levy-Lawson was the son of Joseph Moses Levy, who acquired The Daily Telegraph only months after its founding.

Lord Burnham was succeeded by his eldest son, the second Baron. He followed his father in the management and ownership of the newspaper, but sold it in 1928 to Lord Camrose and partners. Lord Burnham also sat as a Member of Parliament. On 16 May 1919, he was created Viscount Burnham, of Hall Barn in the County of Buckingham, in the Peerage of the United Kingdom.

However, he had no surviving male issue and the viscountcy became extinct on his death, while he was succeeded in the baronetcy and barony by his younger brother, the third Baron. He was succeeded by his son, the fourth Baron. He was a Major-General in the Territorial Army. His younger son, the sixth Baron (who succeeded his elder brother in 1993), was active on the Conservative benches in the House of Lords and served as a Deputy Speaker between 1995 and 2001 and 2002 and 2005 and as Conservative Deputy Chief Whip from 1997 to 2001. Lord Burnham was one of the 90 elected hereditary peers who were allowed to remain in the House of Lords after the passing of the House of Lords Act 1999. As of 2015, the title is held by his son, the seventh Baron, who succeeded in 2005.

The family retained an interest in The Daily Telegraph after it was sold in 1928. The fourth Baron and his son the sixth Baron were both executives of the newspaper until the Camrose interests were in turn displaced by Conrad Black in 1986.

The first Baron's sons retained the name Levy-Lawson though predominantly using Lawson, and the fourth Baron was registered with it at birth, but subsequently they have used Lawson only.

== Levy-Lawson baronets (1892) ==
- Edward Levy-Lawson, 1st Baronet (1833–1916) (created Baron Burnham in 1903)

=== Baron Burnham (1903) ===
- Edward Levy-Lawson, 1st Baron Burnham (1833–1916)
- Harry Lawson Webster Levy-Lawson, 2nd Baron Burnham (1862–1933) (created Viscount Burnham in 1919)

=== Viscount Burnham (1919) ===
- Harry Lawson Webster Levy-Lawson, 1st Viscount Burnham (1862–1933)

=== Baron Burnham (1903; reverted) ===
- William Arnold Webster Levy-Lawson, 3rd Baron Burnham (1864–1943)
- Edward Frederick Lawson, 4th Baron Burnham (1890–1963)
- William Edward Harry Lawson, 5th Baron Burnham (1920–1993)
- Hugh John Frederick Lawson, 6th Baron Burnham (1931–2005)
- Harry Frederick Alan Lawson, 7th Baron Burnham (born 1968)

There is no heir to the baronetcy and the barony.

=== Title succession chart ===
Title succession chart, Barons Burnham

Levy-Lawson baronets Baron Burnham
Edward Levy-Lawson; 1st Baron Burnham; 1st Baronet; 1833–1916
Viscount Burnham
Harry Levy-Lawson; 1st Viscount Burnham; 2nd Baron Burnham; 1862–1933	William Levy-Lawson; 3rd Baron Burnham; 3rd Baronet; 1864–1943
Viscountcy extinct
Edward Lawson; 4th Baron Burnham; 1890–1963	Lt. William Levy-Lawson; 1893–1914
William Lawson; 5th Baron Burnham; 1920–1993	Hugh Lawson; 6th Baron Burnham; 1931–2005
Edward Lawson; 1952–1952	Harry Lawson; 7th Baron Burnham born 1968

Baronetage of the United Kingdom
Preceded by Hunt baronets	Levy-Lawson baronets of Hall Barn and Peterborough Court; 13 October 1892	Succeeded by Morgan baronets
