= Frederick K. Burnham =

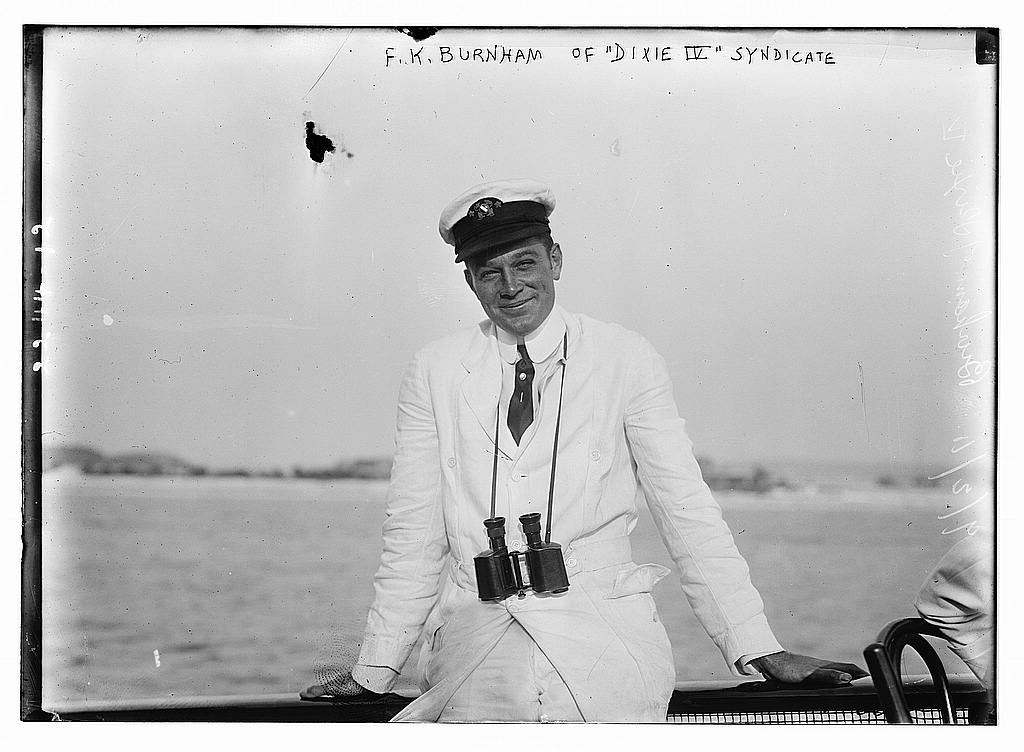
Burnham in 1911

Frederick K. Burnham was the winner of the APBA Challenge Cup with his boat Dixie III in 1910. He was also a winner of the Harmsworth Cup.

== Biography ==
In 1910 and 1911 he won the Harmsworth Trophy for power boat racing in his boats Dixie III and Dixie IV.

In 1911 he was charged with criminal negligence and cowardice by Dr. R.A. Toms, Justice of the Peace of Tonawanda, New York. Harold W. Bell was killed when Burnham's motorboat, the Dixie IV, ran ashore while competing in championship races here on September 16, 1911.

Burnham married, in June 1907, Lillian Richardson Baldwin (1882-1967), who was a niece of the opera star Lillian Nordica. They divorced in 1912 and had two children: Frederick W. Burnham (born 1908) and Annette Patricia Burnham (1910-1966).
