= Edward Goodwin Burnham =

American politician

Edward Goodwin Burnham (June 2, 1827 - before May 5, 1908) was the president of Eaton, Cole Cole & Burnham Company. He was a member of the Connecticut State Senate, 14th District, from 1887 to 1888.

== Biography ==
He was born in Springfield, Massachusetts on June 2, 1827. He died before May 5, 1908.
