= Van Burnham =

American writer

- Born: June 28, 1971 (age 54); Raleigh, North Carolina
- Occupations: Author & Curator
- Notable work: Supercade
- Website: http://www.supercade.com

Van Burnham (born June 28, 1971) is an American writer, designer, producer, and curator. She is the author of Supercade: A Visual History of the Videogame Age (MIT Press) and former contributing editor of Wired. Burnham curated the games component of Beyond the Streets and wrote the essay “Graffiti x Games” for the catalog, exploring the relationship between videogames and street art. She also curated and produced the ARCADIA exhibition for Soho House, launched in West Hollywood.

Burnham resides in Los Angeles, California where she stewards the Supercade private arcade museum.

== Books ==
- Burnham, Van (August 2001). Supercade: A Visual History of the Videogame Age 1971–1984. MIT Press. ISBN 9780262024921.
- Burnham, Van (November 2021). Supercade: A Visual History of the Videogame Age 1985–2001. Supercade Press. ISBN 9781737983804.
