= The White Horse, Burnham Green =

Pub in Datchworth, Hertfordshire, England

Coordinates: 51.8343°N 0.1695°W

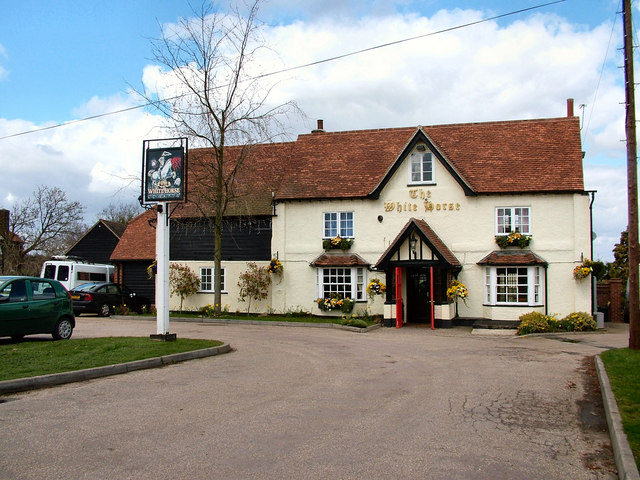
The White Horse

The White Horse is a grade II listed public house in Whitehorse Lane, Burnham Green, in the parish of Datchworth in Hertfordshire. The building dates from around the seventeenth century. It was formerly known as The Chequers.
