= Sherburne Wesley Burnham =

American astronomer

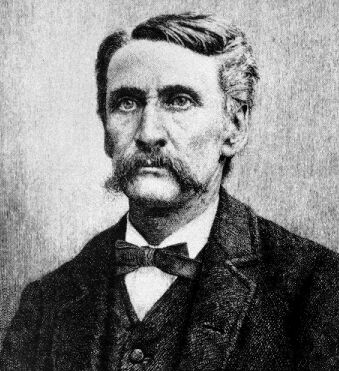
- Born: December 12, 1838
- Died: March 11, 1921 (aged 82)

Sherburne Wesley Burnham (December 12, 1838 – March 11, 1921) was an American astronomer.

For more than 50 years Burnham spent all his free time observing the heavens, mainly concerning himself with binary stars.

== Biography ==
Sherburne Wesley Burnham was born in Thetford, Vermont. His parents were Roswell O. Burnham and Marinda (née Foote) Burnham.

He graduated from the academy in Thetford, and that was the extent of his schooling. He taught himself shorthand, and by 1858 was in New York City.

Burnham was a reporter for the Union Army in New Orleans during the Civil War. While in New Orleans, he bought a copy of a popular book Geography of the Heavens, which piqued his interest in astronomy.

After the war, he moved to Chicago and worked as a court reporter for over 20 years. At night Burnham was an amateur astronomer, except for four years (1888–1892) he worked as a professional astronomer at Lick Observatory. He left court reporting in 1902, but remained in Chicago. From 1897–1914 he was an astronomer at Yerkes Observatory.

== Double star discoveries ==
During the 1840s it was believed that essentially all the binary stars visible to the instruments then available had been found. Friedrich Struve (catalog abbr. Σ) and his son Otto Struve (catalog abbr. σ) had catalogued a good number of binary stars working at the Dorpat and Pulkovo observatories, using 23 cm and 38 cm telescopes.

From 1872–1877, with his small 15 cm (5.9 in) telescope, Burnham found 451 new double stars, with the help of a European astronomer, baron Dembowski, who measured exact positions and separations of Burnham’s newly discovered binaries.

In 1873–1874, he produced a catalog of double stars. He became a fellow of the Royal Astronomical Society. He continued to identify double stars, and later published the General Catalogue of 1,290 Double Stars. In 1906, he published the Burnham Double Star Catalogue, containing 13,665 pairs of stars.

The quality of Burnham's work opened the doors of observatories for him and he had access to more powerful instruments at Lick, Yerkes, and other observatories. He is credited with having discovered 1,340 binary stars.

Burnham discovered the first example of, what would be called a half century later, a Herbig–Haro object, called Burnham's Nebula (now labeled as HH 255).

== Honors ==
He received the Gold Medal of the Royal Astronomical Society in 1894. The French Academy of Sciences awarded him the Lalande Prize for 1904.

The lunar crater Burnham and asteroid 834 Burnhamia were named in his honour.
