= USS Dixie III =

Patrol vessel of the United States Navy

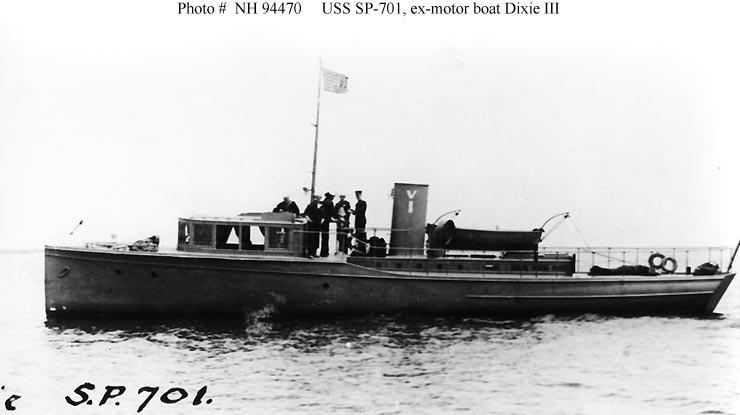
- USS SP-701, ex-USS Dixie III sometime between April 1918 and May 1919.

History

United States
- Name: USS Dixie III (1917-1918); USS SP-701 (1918-1919)
- Namesake: Dixie III was her previous name retained; SP-701 was her section patrol number
- Builder: Bowes and Mower, Philadelphia, Pennsylvania
- Completed: 1911
- Acquired: early May 1917
- Commissioned: early May 1917
- Renamed: SP-701 April 1918
- Fate: Returned to owner May 1919
- Notes: Operated as civilian motorboat Dixie III 1911-1917 and from 1919

General characteristics
- Type: Patrol vessel
- Length: 54.1 ft (16.5 m)

USS Dixie III (SP-701), later USS SP-701, was a United States Navy patrol vessel in commission from 1917 to 1919.

Dixie III was built in 1911 as a civilian motorboat of the same name by Bowes and Mower at Philadelphia, Pennsylvania. The State of Maine operated her as a pleasure craft until early May 1917, when the U.S. Navy acquired her for use as a section patrol vessel during World War I. She was commissioned as USS Dixie III (SP-701) in early May 1917.

Probably assigned to the 1st Naval District in northern New England, Dixie III served on patrol duty for the rest of World War I. In April 1918 she was renamed USS SP-701.

SP-701 was returned to the State of Maine in May 1919.
