= Edward Levy-Lawson, 1st Baron Burnham =

British newspaper proprietor (1833-1916)

The Right Honourable The Lord Burnham KCVO
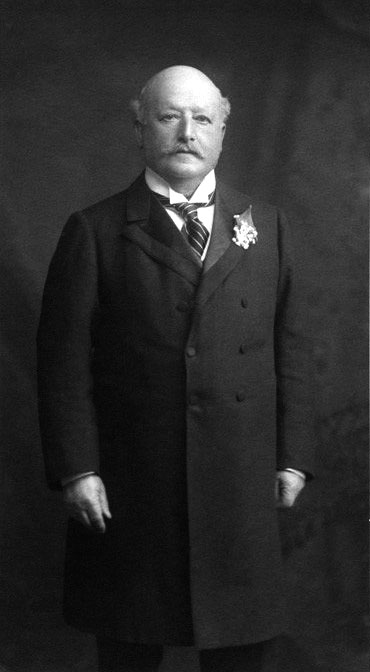
- Born: Edward Levy; 28 December 1833; London, England
- Died: 9 January 1916 (aged 82); Forest Gate, London, England
- Burial place: Beaconsfield, Buckinghamshire, England
- Education: London University School
- Spouse: Harriette Georgiana Webster (m. 1862; died 1897)
- Children: 3, including Harry
- Parents: Joseph Moses Levy (father); Esther Cohen (mother)

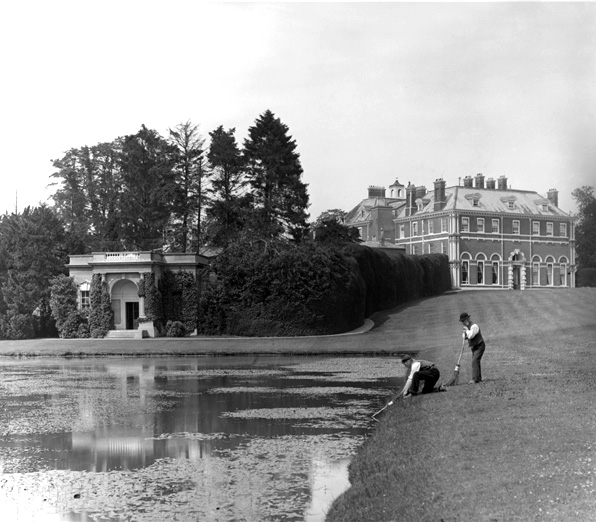
The Hall Barn estate

Edward Levy-Lawson, 1st Baron Burnham, KCVO (28 December 1833 – 9 January 1916), known as Sir Edward Levy-Lawson, 1st Baronet, from 1892 to 1903, was an English newspaper proprietor. He was the owner and publisher of The Daily Telegraph.

== Biography ==
Edward Levy-Lawson was born Edward Levy, in London, on 28 December 1833, the son of Joseph Moses Levy and his wife Esther (née Cohen). In December 1875 his name was legally changed to Levy-Lawson. He was educated at University College School in Hampstead, London. His father had acquired The Daily Telegraph – known as The Daily Telegraph and Courier – in 1855, only months after its founding. Levy-Lawson was editor and in control of the paper long before his father's death in 1888. From 1885, he was managing proprietor, and sole controller of his renamed The Daily Telegraph and became even more influential than his father on Fleet Street.

In 1875, he assumed by royal licence the surname of Lawson in addition to and after that of Levy. He bought the Hall Barn estate in 1880. He was created a Baronet, of Hall Barn in the County of Buckingham, in 1892, and in 1903 he was raised to the peerage as Baron Burnham, of Hall Barn in the Parish of Beaconsfield in the County of Buckingham. In 1886, he was appointed High Sheriff of Buckinghamshire.

== Personal life ==
Levy-Lawson's family was Jewish. He married Harriette Georgiana Webster, daughter of Benjamin Nottingham Webster, at Parish Church, Kennington, Kent, in 1862. They had three children together, Harry (later Viscount Burnham), William and Edith. Lady Burnham died in 1897. It is also believed that Levy-Lawson may have been the natural father of the author Reginald Turner, although Turner's father may have been another man of the Levy-Lawson family.

Lord Burnham's love of pheasant shooting resulted in him enjoying a close relationship with King Edward VII, his son, King George V, and his son King Edward VIII, with King George paying yearly visits to him at his home, the 4,000 acre estate Hall Barn. On 18 December 1913, it was recorded by the Prince of Wales himself – later King Edward VIII – that he and his father King George had "shot over a thousand pheasants in six hours – about one bird every 20 seconds". Altogether, 3,937 pheasants were killed. While it has been said that the shoot was not a slaughter and that very respectable birds were presented to the Guns, on the train journey home, the Prince of Wales noticed that the King was unusually quiet, his silence eventually broken when he famously said: "Perhaps we overdid it today."

Lord Burnham died on 9 January 1916, aged 82, in Forest Gate, London, and was succeeded in the barony by his eldest son Harry. He was buried in Beaconsfield, Buckinghamshire.

== Arms ==
Coat of arms of Edward Levy-Lawson, 1st Baron Burnham

Escutcheon
Quarterly 1st & 4th Azure three bars gemel Argent over all a winged morion Or 2nd & 3rd Gules a saltire double parted and fretted Or between in fess two rams' heads couped in fess Argent.
Supporters
Dexter the figure of Clio the Muse of history Proper sinister the figure of Hermes vested Argent mantled Azure on the head of a winged morion on his heels wings and in his exterior hand a caduceus Or.
Motto
Of Old I Hold

== Notes ==
Peerage of the United Kingdom
New creation	Baron Burnham; 1903–1916	Succeeded by Harry Levy-Lawson
Baronetage of the United Kingdom
New creation	Baronet (of Hall Barn); 1892–1916	Succeeded by Harry Levy-Lawson
