= Harry Burnham =

American politician (1875–1951)

Member of the Nebraska Legislature from the 35th district
- In office January 5, 1943 – January 2, 1951
- Preceded by: A. C. Van Diest
- Succeeded by: K. W. Peterson

Personal details
- Born: October 9, 1875 Norway, Maine
- Died: July 26, 1951 (aged 75) Alliance, Nebraska
- Party: Republican
- Spouse: Maggie M. Copley (m. 1900)
- Children: 2
- Occupation: Farmer, rancher

Harry Frost Burnham (October 9, 1875 – July 26, 1951) was a Republican politician from Nebraska who served as a member of the Nebraska Legislature from the 35th district from 1943 to 1951.

== Early life ==
Burnham was born in Norway, Maine, in 1875, and moved with his parents to Nebraska in 1877, and they settled in Custer County in 1881 and began farming.

In 1910, Burnham ran for the Custer County Board of Supervisors from the 1st district. Incumbent Supervisor J. E. Grint declined to run for re-election, and T. P. Owens won both the Republican and Democratic primaries to succeed him. Burnham filed to run in the general election as a petition candidate, and defeated Owen. He was re-elected in 1912.

Burnham Burnham declined to run for re-election in 1914, and instead ran for Custer County Clerk. He won the Republican primary over O. W. Barnard, W. H. Osborne, Chalmers Empfield, and Harry Knapp, receiving 37 percent of the vote. Burnham was narrowly defeated in the general election, receiving 40 percent of the vote to Democrat Robert Waters's 43 percent and Progressive H. F. Hanson's 16 percent. He challenged Waters in 1916, and won the Republican primary. In the general election, he lost to Waters again, receiving 43 percent of the vote to Waters's 57 percent.

In 1926, Burnham ran for the Board of Supervisors from the 1st district, challenging incumbent Democratic Supervisor R. J. Mills for re-election. He won the Republican primary unopposed, and in the general election, narrowly defeated Mills, winning 53–47 percent. He was re-elected over Mills in 1930 in a landslide, and was re-elected in 1934 and 1938. He did not seek re-election in 1942.

== Nebraska Legislature ==
In 1942, State Senator A. C. Van Diest declined to seek re-election, and Burnham ran to succeed him in the 35th district, which included Custer, Garfield, and Loup counties. In the nonpartisan primary, he faced former State Senator James P. Murray and attorney Ross G. Moore. Burnham placed first in the primary, winning 45 percent of the vote to Moore's 32 percent and Murray's 23 percent. He and Moore advanced to the general election, which he won in a landslide, defeating Moore, 61–39 percent.

Burnham ran for re-election in 1944, and was challenged by Murray. He placed first in the primary by a wide margin, receiving 70 percent of the vote to Murray's 30 percent. In the general election, Burnham defeated Murray, winning 71–29 percent.

In 1946, Burnham ran for a third term. He faced three opponents: Edith Haynes, Harry Massie, and Murray. Burnham placed first in the primary, winning 37 percent of the vote to Massie's 28 percent, Haynes's 23 percent, and Murray's 12 percent. Burnham and Massie proceeded to the general election, which Burnham only narrowly won, defeating Massie with 51 percent of the vote.

Burnham sought a fourth term in 1948, and was challenged again by Haynes and Massie. He narrowly placed first in the primary, winning 39 percent of the vote to Massie's 36 percent and Haynes's 25 percent. He faced Massie again in the general election, and won re-election, 53–47 percent.

In 1950, Burnham ran for re-election, and was challenged by Haynes and businessman K. W. Peterson. Burnham received 36 percent of the vote in the primary, and advanced to the general election with Peterson, who narrowly placed second with 34 percent. Peterson ultimately defeated Burnham by a thin margin, winning 51 percent of the vote to his 49 percent.

== Death ==
Burnham died on July 26, 1951.
