= Joseph Moses Levy =

British newspaper editor (1812-1888)

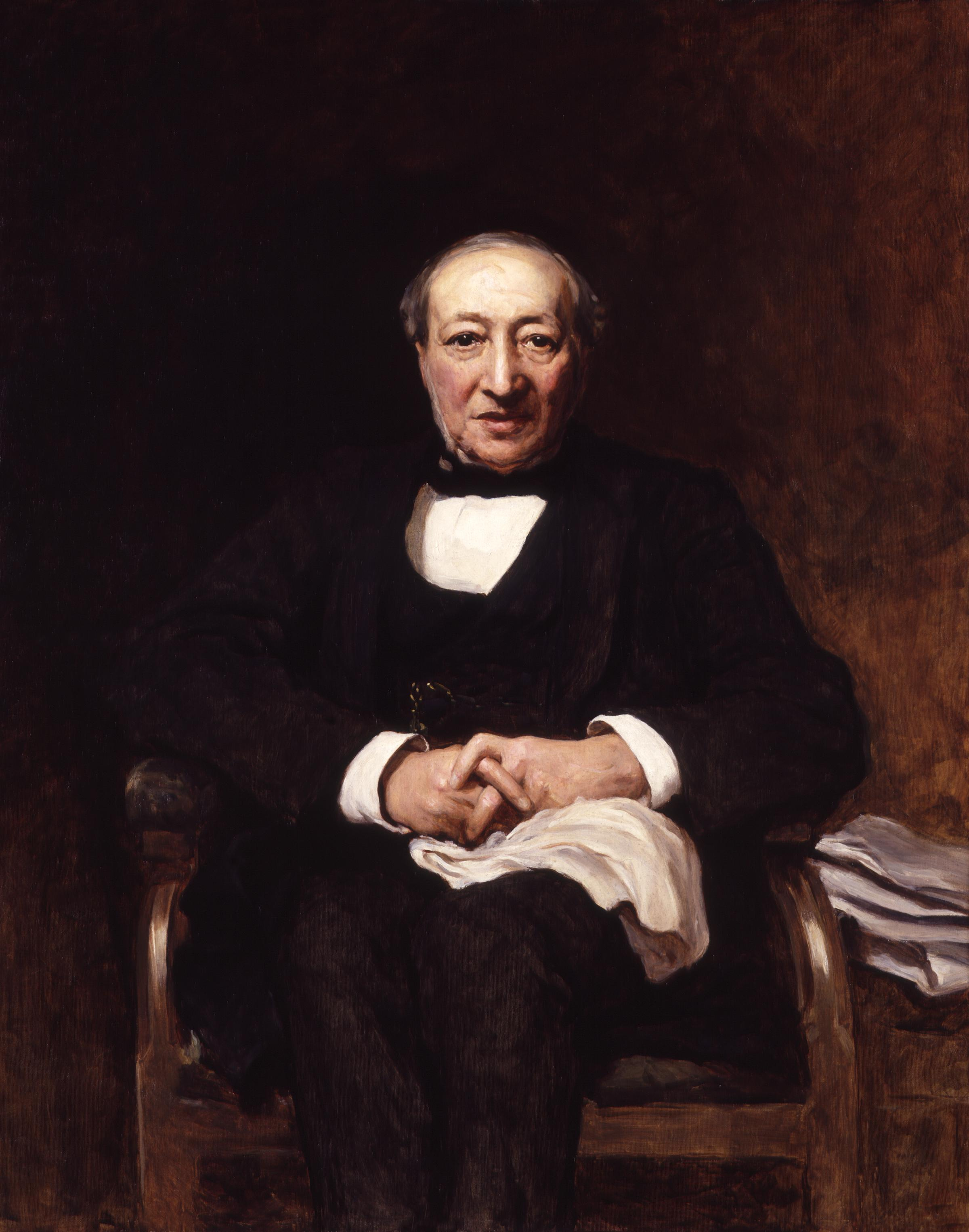
- Joseph Moses Levy, by Hubert von Herkomer, exhibited 1888
- Born: 15 December 1812; London, England
- Died: 12 October 1888 (aged 75); Ramsgate, England
- Resting place: Balls Pond Road Cemetery
- Education: Bruce Castle School
- Spouse: Esther Cohen (m. 1830)
- Children: 7, including Edward Levy-Lawson

Joseph Moses Levy (15 December 1812 – 12 October 1888) was a British newspaper editor and publisher.

== Biography ==
Levy was born in London on 15 December 1812 to Moses Levy and Helena Moses. He was educated at Bruce Castle School, after which he was sent to Germany to learn the printing trade. When he returned to England he established a printing company in Shoe Lane, Fleet Street. Levy became involved in the newspaper industry; by 1855 he was chief proprietor of The Sunday Times.

Colonel Arthur Sleigh founded the Daily Telegraph & Courier on 29 June 1855, and Levy agreed to print the newspaper. The venture was not a success and when Sleigh was unable to pay his printing bill, Levy took over the newspaper.

In 1855, there were ten newspapers published in London. The Times, at sevenpence, was the most expensive and had a circulation of 10,000. Its two main rivals, the Daily News and the Morning Post, both cost fivepence. Levy believed that if he could produce a cheaper newspaper than his main competitors, he could expand the size of the overall market.

Levy decided that his son, Edward Levy-Lawson, and Thornton Leigh Hunt, should edit the newspaper. When he re-launched the newspaper on 17 September 1855, Levy used the slogan, "the largest, best, and cheapest newspaper in the world". Within a few weeks, the one-penny Daily Telegraph was outselling The Times, and by January 1856, Levy was able to announce that circulation had reached 27,000.

The early Daily Telegraph supported the Liberal Party and progressive causes such as the campaign against capital punishment. It also urged reform of the House of Lords and the banning of corporal punishment in the armed forces.

Karl Marx's book Herr Vogt, published in 1860, included a personal, antisemitic attack on Levy, after the Daily Telegraph reprinted an article by Carl Vogt critical of Marx. After criticising the Telegraph's 'determination to be Anglo-Saxon', Marx continues:

Mother Nature has inscribed [Levy's] origins in the clearest possible way right in the middle of his face. The nose of the mysterious stranger of Slawkenbergius who had got the finest nose from the promontory of noses was just a nine–days' wonder in Strasbourg, whereas Levy's nose provides conversation throughout the year in the City of London ... Indeed the great skill of Levy's nose consists in its ability to titillate with a rotten smell, to sniff it out a hundred miles away and to attract it. Thus Levy's nose serves the Daily Telegraph as Elephant's trunk, antenna, lighthouse and telegraph.

Levy was heavily involved in the production of the Daily Telegraph. As well as managing the newspaper he also wrote theatre and art reviews.

Levy died at his home, Florence Cottage, on 12 October 1888, in Ramsgate, Kent.

== Personal life ==
Throughout most of his life Levy lived at 51 Grosvenor Street, London. He married Esther Cohen in 1830.

Levy had seven children, six of which were with Cohen. Their daughter Helen married Sir George Faudel-Phillips; their son Edward Levy-Lawson, 1st Baron Burnham, owned the Daily Telegraph outright and expanded its success greatly. Edward Levy-Lawson was the grandfather of Maj. Hon. Sir John Spencer Coke.

== Sources ==
- Oxford Dictionary of National Biography
