= Hugh Lawson, 6th Baron Burnham =

British hereditary peer (1931–2005)

The Right Honourable The Lord Burnham

Member of the House of Lords
- Lord Temporal
- Hereditary peerage 21 September 1993 – 11 November 1999
- Preceded by: The 5th Baron Burnham
- Succeeded by: Seat abolished
- Elected Hereditary Peer; 11 November 1999 – 1 January 2005
- Election: 1999
- Preceded by: Seat established
- Succeeded by: The 7th Baron de Mauley

Personal details
- Born: Hugh John Frederick Lawson; 15 August 1931
- Died: 1 January 2005 (aged 73)
- Party: Conservative
- Occupation: Politician, journalist

Hugh John Frederick Lawson, 6th Baron Burnham (15 August 1931 – 1 January 2005), was a British hereditary peer and journalist.

== Early life and education ==
Burnham was born in 1931, the younger son of Major General Edward Lawson, 4th Baron Burnham, and his wife Marie Enid Robson. He was educated at Eton and read PPE at Balliol College, Oxford.

== Career ==
Initially working for the Cambridge Evening News, Burnham joined The Daily Telegraph prior to its 1986 takeover by Conrad Black and held the positions of general manager and deputy managing director in the 1970s and 80s.

He inherited the barony and a seat in the House of Lords upon the death of his elder brother William Lawson, 5th Baron Burnham in 1993. He had a career in the House of Lords as a Conservative defence spokesman and junior whip. He was one of the 90 hereditary peers selected to remain in the Lords after the passing of the House of Lords Act 1999.

== Marriage and children ==
Burnham married Hilary Hunter on 31 December 1955. They had three children:

- Hon. Charlotte Ann Lawson (born 12 January 1960)
- Hon. Emma Lucia Lawson (born 8 August 1961)
- Harry Frederick Alan Lawson, 7th Baron Burnham (born 22 February 1968)

== Death ==
Lord Burnham died in January 2005 at the age of 73. He was succeeded in the barony by his only son, Harry.

== Arms ==
Coat of arms of Hugh Lawson, 6th Baron Burnham
Escutcheon Quarterly 1st & 4th Azure three bars gemel Argent over all a winged morion Or 2nd & 3rd Gules a saltire double parted and fretted Or between in fess two rams' heads couped in fess Argent. Supporters Dexter the figure of Clio the Muse of history Proper sinister the figure of Hermes vested Argent mantled Azure on the head of a winged morion on his heels wings and in his exterior hand a caduceus Or. Motto Of Old I Hold

Peerage of the United Kingdom
Preceded by William Lawson	Baron Burnham; 1993–2005; Member of the House of Lords (1993–1999)	Succeeded by Harry Lawson
Parliament of the United Kingdom
New office created by the House of Lords Act 1999	Elected hereditary peer to the House of Lords under the House of Lords Act 1999; 1999–2005	Succeeded by The Lord de Mauley
