= Burnham (crater) =

Crater on the Moon

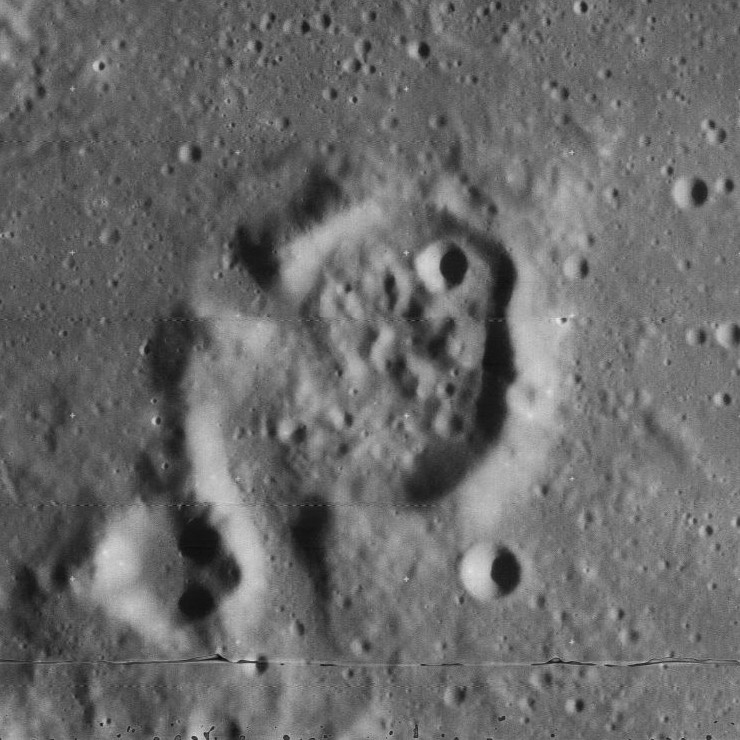
- Lunar Orbiter 4 image
- Coordinates: 13.9°S 7.3°E
- Diameter: 24.09 km (14.97 mi)
- Depth: 0.9 km (0.56 mi)
- Colongitude: 353° at sunrise
- Eponym: Sherburne W. Burnham

Burnham is a small crater located to the southeast of the crater Albategnius, in a relatively smooth area of the lunar surface. To the southwest is Vogel.

The irregular tooth-like shape of the rim of Burnham protrudes to the southwest, giving the wall a distorted, asymmetric appearance. There are breaks in the rim to the northwest and southwest, the later forming a valley running about 15 km. The interior floor is rough and irregular, and lacks anything resembling a central peak. The abundance of small hills covering the crater floor from rim to rim makes it unusual.

This formation was named after American astronomer Sherburne W. Burnham (1838-1921), a noted double star observer. His name was added to lunar nomenclature by Johann N. Krieger and Rudolf König during 1898–1912. Its designation was officially adopted by the International Astronomical Union in 1935.

== Views ==
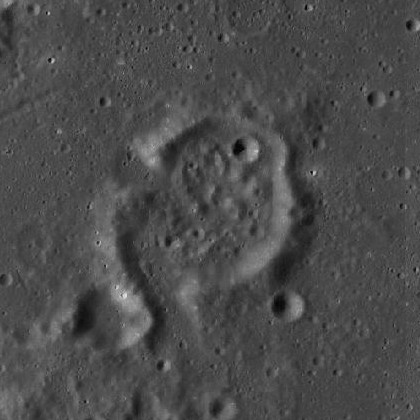
LRO WAC mosaic

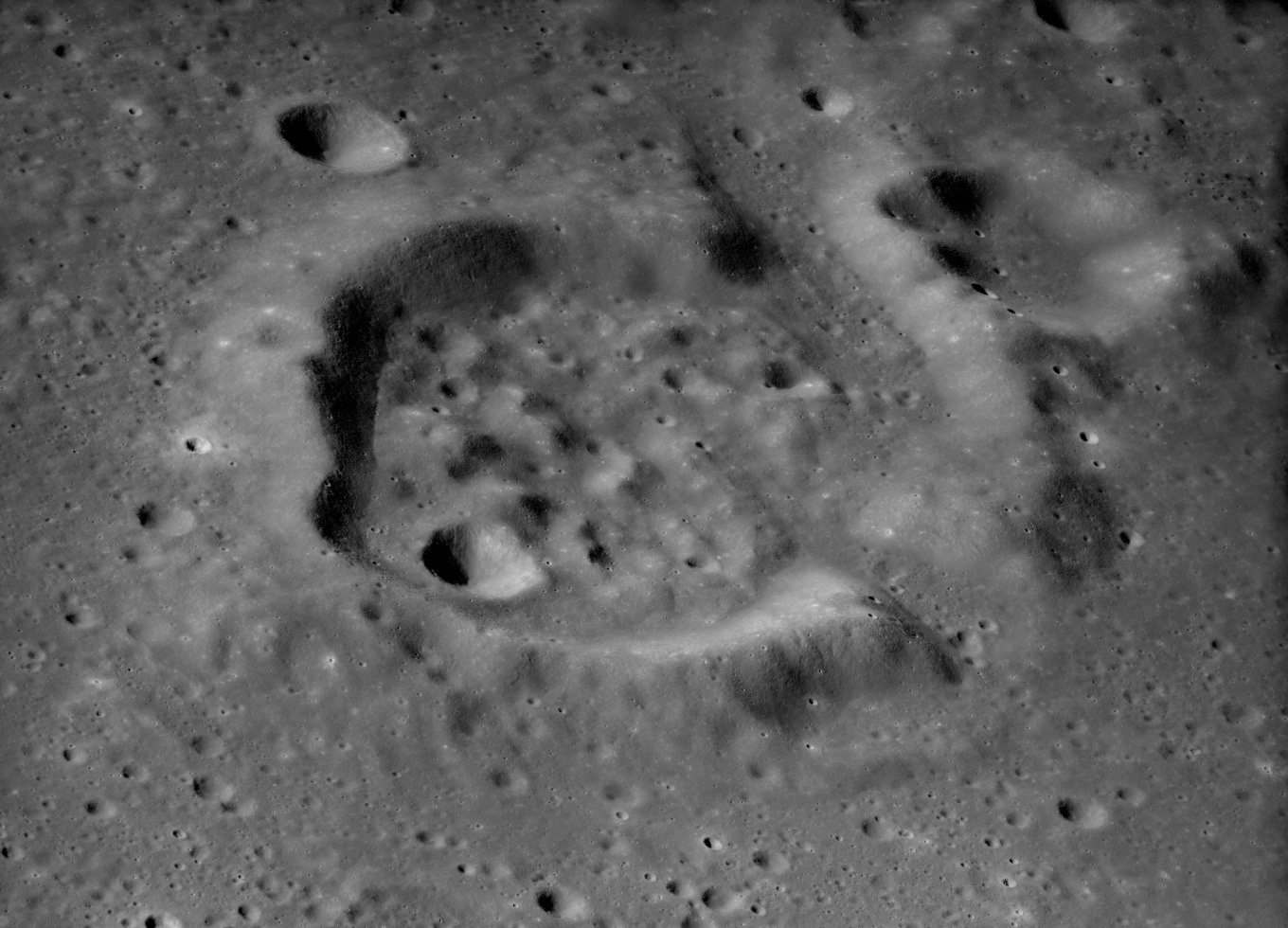
Oblique view from Apollo 16, facing south

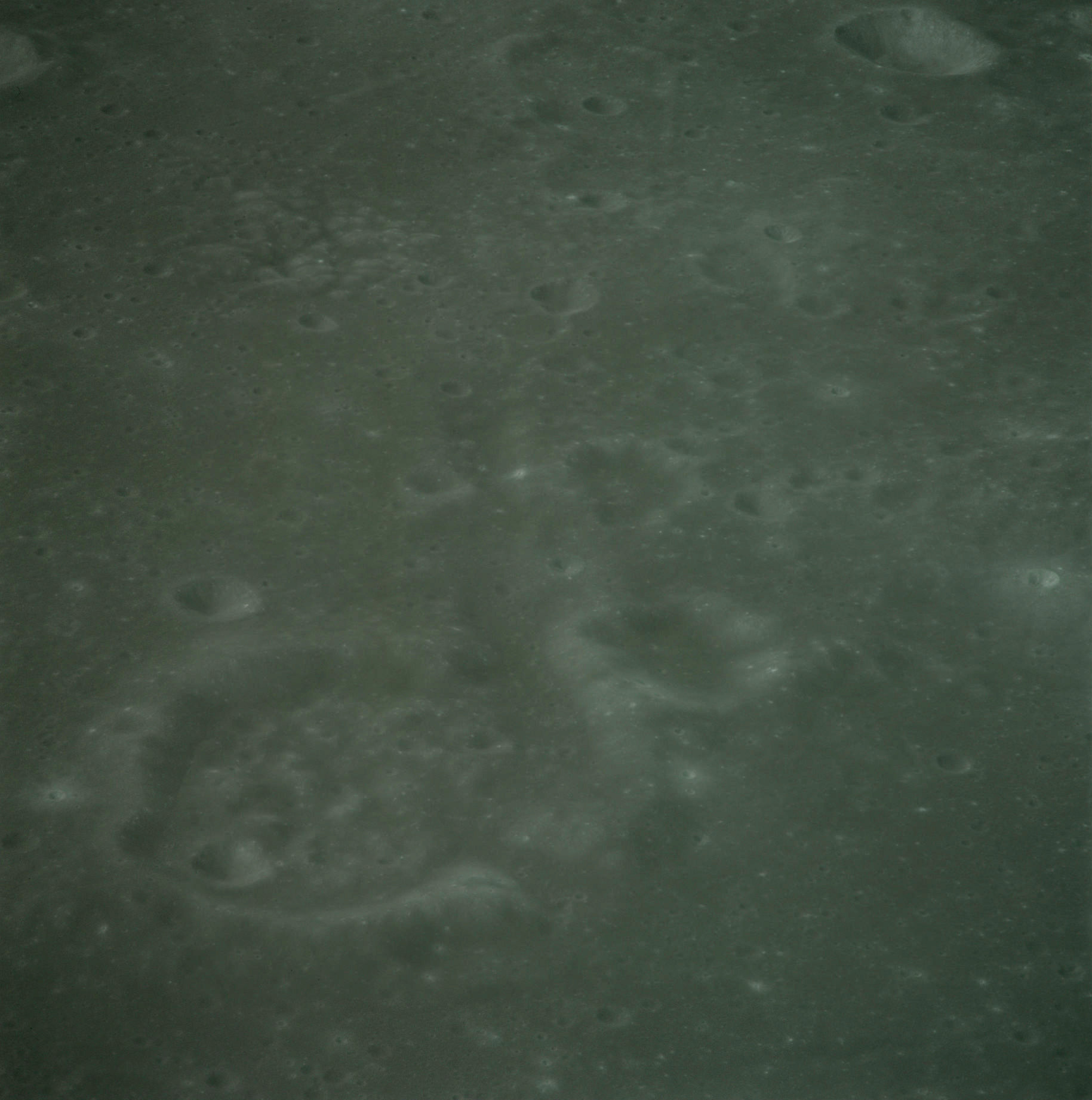
Oblique color view, facing south, also from Apollo 16

== Satellite craters ==
By convention these features are identified on lunar maps by placing the letter on the side of the crater midpoint that is closest to Burnham.

Burnham	Latitude	Longitude	Diameter
A	14.8° S	7.1° E	7 km
B	15.3° S	7.3° E	4 km
F	14.3° S	6.9° E	9 km
K	13.6° S	7.4° E	3 km
L	14.2° S	7.6° E	4 km
M	14.1° S	9.0° E	9 km
T	14.7° S	9.6° E	4 km
