= The Daily Telegraph =

British daily broadsheet newspaper

- Was, is, and will be

- 160th anniversary edition front page on 29 June 2015
- Type: Daily newspaper
- Format: Broadsheet
- Owner(s): Telegraph Media Group (Axel Springer SE)
- Founder: Arthur B. Sleigh
- Editor: Christopher Evans
- Founded: 29 June 1855; 171 years ago (as Daily Telegraph & Courier)
- Political alignment: Conservative; Right-wing
- Headquarters: London, England
- Country: United Kingdom
- Circulation: 317,817 (as of December 2019)
- Sister newspapers: The Sunday Telegraph
- ISSN: 0307-1235 (print); 2059-7487 (web)
- OCLC number: 49632006
- Website: telegraph.co.uk

The Daily Telegraph, also known as The Telegraph, is a British daily broadsheet conservative newspaper published in London by Telegraph Media Group and distributed in the United Kingdom and internationally. It was founded by Arthur B. Sleigh in 1855 as The Daily Telegraph and Courier. The Telegraph was headlined by the BBC in 2004 as the UK's "other paper of record" and mentioned in the Broadview Guide to Writing in 2017 as a newspaper of record among others. The paper's motto, "Was, is, and will be", was included in its emblem which was used for over a century starting in 1858.

In 2013, The Daily Telegraph and The Sunday Telegraph, which started in 1961, were merged, although the latter retains its own editor. Both papers are politically conservative and support the Conservative Party, although the Daily Telegraph was moderately liberal before the late 1870s.

The Telegraph has had a number of news scoops, including an eyewitness account of the outbreak of the Second World War by a novice reporter, Clare Hollingworth, which has been described as "the scoop of the century"; the 2009 parliamentary expenses scandal, which led to a number of high-profile political resignations and for which the paper was named 2009 British Newspaper of the Year; its 2016 undercover investigation of the England football manager Sam Allardyce; and the Lockdown Files in 2023.

In May 2025, an investment management firm, RedBird Capital Partners, announced plans to acquire the newspaper's publisher for £500 million (about US$674 million), but the deal collapsed in November 2025. In March 2026, it was announced that the Telegraph Media Group would be acquired for £575 million by the German company Axel Springer SE, which CEO Mathias Döpfner described as a long‑standing goal and stated that The Daily Telegraph's editorial character would be preserved. The acquisition was completed in June 2026.

== History ==
=== Founding and early history ===
The Daily Telegraph and Courier was founded by Colonel Arthur B. Sleigh in June 1855 to air a personal grievance against the future commander-in-chief of the British Army, Prince George, Duke of Cambridge. Joseph Moses Levy, the owner of The Sunday Times, agreed to print the newspaper, and the first edition was published on 29 June 1855. The paper cost 2d and was four pages long. Nevertheless, the first edition stressed the quality and independence of its articles and journalists: "We shall be guided by a high tone of independent action." As the paper was not a success, Sleigh was unable to pay Levy the printing bill.

Levy took over the newspaper, his aim being to produce a cheaper newspaper than his main competitors in London, the Daily News and The Morning Post, to expand the size of the overall market. Levy appointed his son, Edward Levy-Lawson, Lord Burnham, and Thornton Leigh Hunt to edit the newspaper. Lord Burnham relaunched the paper as The Daily Telegraph, with the slogan "the largest, best, and cheapest newspaper in the world". Hunt laid out the newspaper's principles in a memorandum sent to Levy: "We should report all striking events in science, so told that the intelligent public can understand what has happened and can see its bearing on our daily life and our future. The same principle should apply to all other events—to fashion, to new inventions, to new methods of conducting business".

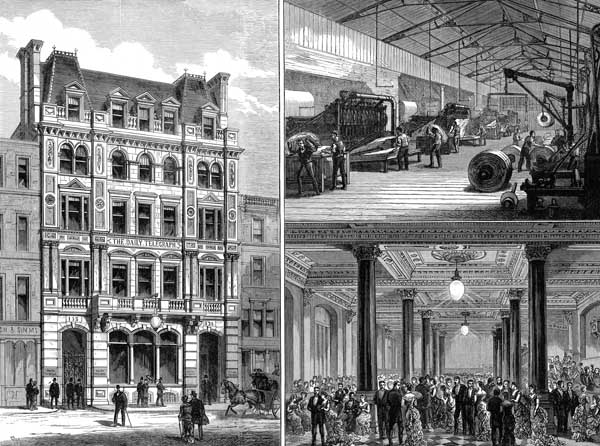
In 1882 The Daily Telegraph moved to new Fleet Street premises, which were pictured in the Illustrated London News.

In 1876, Jules Verne published his novel Michael Strogoff, whose plot takes place during a fictional uprising and war in Siberia. Verne included among the book's characters a war correspondent of The Daily Telegraph, named Harry Blount—who is depicted as an exceptionally dedicated, resourceful and brave journalist, taking great personal risks to follow closely the ongoing war and bring accurate news of it to The Telegraph's readership, ahead of competing papers.

=== 1901 to 1945 ===
In 1908, The Daily Telegraph printed an article in the form of an interview with Kaiser Wilhelm II of Germany that damaged Anglo-German relations and added to international tensions in the build-up to World War I. In 1928, the son of Baron Burnham, Harry Lawson Webster Levy-Lawson, 2nd Baron Burnham, sold the paper to William Berry, 1st Viscount Camrose, in partnership with his brother Gomer Berry, 1st Viscount Kemsley and Edward Iliffe, 1st Baron Iliffe.

In 1937, the newspaper absorbed The Morning Post, which traditionally espoused a conservative position and sold predominantly amongst the retired officer class. Originally William Ewart Berry, 1st Viscount Camrose, bought The Morning Post with the intention of publishing it alongside The Daily Telegraph, but poor sales of the former led him to merge the two. For some years, the paper was retitled The Daily Telegraph and Morning Post before it reverted to just The Daily Telegraph.

In the late 1930s, Victor Gordon Lennox, The Telegraph's diplomatic editor, published an anti-appeasement private newspaper The Whitehall Letter that received much of its information from leaks from Sir Robert Vansittart, the Permanent Under-Secretary of the Foreign Office, and Rex Leeper, the Foreign Office's Press Secretary. As a result, Gordon Lennox was monitored by MI5. In 1939, The Telegraph published Clare Hollingworth's scoop that Germany was to invade Poland.

In November 1940, Fleet Street, with its close proximity to the river and docklands, was subjected to almost daily bombing raids by the Luftwaffe and The Telegraph started printing in Manchester at Kemsley House (now The Printworks entertainment venue), which was run by Camrose's brother Kemsley. Manchester quite often printed the entire run of The Telegraph when its Fleet Street offices were under threat. The name Kemsley House was changed to Thomson House in 1959. In 1986, printing of Northern editions of the Daily and Sunday Telegraph moved to Trafford Park and in 2008 to Newsprinters at Knowsley, Liverpool.

During the Second World War, The Daily Telegraph covertly helped in the recruitment of code-breakers for Bletchley Park. The ability to solve The Telegraph's crossword in under 12 minutes was considered to be a recruitment test. The newspaper was asked to organise a crossword competition, after which each of the successful participants was contacted and asked if they would be prepared to undertake "a particular type of work as a contribution to the war effort". The competition itself was won by F. H. W. Hawes of Dagenham who finished the crossword in less than eight minutes.

=== 1946 to 1985 ===
Both the Camrose (Berry) and Burnham (Levy-Lawson) families remained involved in management until Conrad Black took control in 1986. On the death of his father in 1954, Seymour Berry, 2nd Viscount Camrose assumed the chairmanship of the Daily Telegraph with his brother Michael Berry, Baron Hartwell as his editor-in-chief. During this period, the company saw the launch of sister paper The Sunday Telegraph in 1960.

=== 1986 to 2004 ===
Canadian businessman Conrad Black, through companies controlled by him, bought the Telegraph Group in 1986. Black, through his holding company Ravelston Corporation, owned 78% of Hollinger Inc. which in turn owned 30% of Hollinger International. Hollinger International in turn owned the Telegraph Group and other publications such as the Chicago Sun-Times, the Jerusalem Post and The Spectator.

On 18 January 2004, Black was dismissed as chairman of the Hollinger International board over allegations of financial wrongdoing. Black was also sued by the company. Later that day, it was reported that the Barclay brothers had agreed to purchase Black's 78% interest in Hollinger Inc. for £245m, giving them a controlling interest in the company, and to buy out the minority shareholders later. However, a lawsuit was filed by the Hollinger International board to try to block Black from selling his shares in Hollinger Inc. until an investigation into his dealings was completed. Black filed a countersuit but, eventually, United States judge Leo Strine sided with the Hollinger International board and blocked Black from selling his Hollinger Inc. shares to the twins.

On 7 March 2004, the twins announced that they were launching another bid, this time just for The Daily Telegraph and its Sunday sister paper rather than all of Hollinger Inc. The then owner of the Daily Express, Richard Desmond, was also interested in purchasing the paper, selling his interest in several pornographic magazines to finance the initiative. Desmond withdrew in March 2004, when the price climbed above £600m, as did Daily Mail and General Trust plc a few months later on 17 June.

=== Since 2004 ===
In November 2004, The Telegraph celebrated the tenth anniversary of its website, Electronic Telegraph, now renamed www.telegraph.co.uk. The Electronic Telegraph launched in 1995 with The Daily Telegraph Guide to the Internet by writer Sue Schofield for an annual charge of £180.00. On 8 May 2006, the first stage of a major redesign of the website took place, with a wider page layout and greater prominence for audio, video and journalist blogs.

On 10 October 2005, The Daily Telegraph relaunched to incorporate a tabloid sports section and a new standalone business section. The Daily Mail's star columnist and political analyst Simon Heffer left that paper in October 2005 to rejoin The Daily Telegraph, where he has become associate editor. Heffer has written two columns a week for the paper since late October 2005 and is a regular contributor to the news podcast. In November 2005, the first regular podcast service by a newspaper in the UK was launched. Just before Christmas 2005, it was announced that The Telegraph titles would be moving from Canada Place in Canary Wharf, to new offices at Victoria Plaza at 111 Buckingham Palace Road near Victoria Station in central London. The new office features a "hub and spoke" layout for the newsroom to produce content for print and online editions.

In October 2006, with its relocation to Victoria, the company was renamed the Telegraph Media Group, repositioning itself as a multimedia company. On 2 September 2008, the Daily Telegraph was printed with colour on each page for the first time when it left Westferry for Newsprinters at Broxbourne, Hertfordshire, another arm of the Murdoch company. The paper is also printed in Liverpool and Glasgow by Newsprinters. In May 2009, the daily and Sunday editions published details of MPs' expenses. This led to a number of high-profile resignations from both the ruling Labour administration and the Conservative opposition.

In June 2014, The Telegraph was criticised by Private Eye for its policy of replacing experienced journalists and news managers with less-experienced staff and search engine optimisers.

On 26 October 2019, the Financial Times reported that the Barclay Brothers were about to put the Telegraph Media Group up for sale. The Financial Times also reported that the Daily Mail and General Trust (owner of the Daily Mail, The Mail on Sunday, Metro and Ireland on Sunday) would be interested in buying.

The Daily Telegraph supported Liz Truss in the July–September 2022 Conservative Party leadership election.

In July 2023, it was announced that Lloyds Banking Group had appointed Mike McTighe as chairman of Press Acquisitions Limited and May Corporation Limited in order to spearhead the sale of The Telegraph and The Spectator.

==== Accusation of news coverage influence by advertisers ====
In July 2014, the Daily Telegraph was criticised for carrying links on its website to pro-Kremlin articles supplied by a Russian state-funded publication that downplayed any Russian involvement in the downing of the passenger jet Malaysia Airlines Flight 17. These had featured on its website as part of a commercial deal, but were later removed.

As of 2014, the paper was paid £900,000 a year to include the supplement Russia Beyond the Headlines, a publication sponsored by the Rossiyskaya Gazeta, the Russian government's official newspaper.

In February 2015, the chief political commentator of the Daily Telegraph, Peter Oborne, resigned. Oborne accused the paper of a "form of fraud on its readers" for its coverage of the bank HSBC in relation to a Swiss tax-dodging scandal that was widely covered by other news media. He alleged that editorial decisions about news content had been heavily influenced by the advertising arm of the newspaper because of commercial interests. Jay Rosen at New York University stated that Oborne's resignation statement was "one of the most important things a journalist has written about journalism lately".

Oborne cited other instances of advertising strategy influencing the content of articles, linking the refusal to take an editorial stance on the repression of democratic demonstrations in Hong Kong to the Telegraph's support from China. Additionally, he said that favourable reviews of the Cunard cruise liner Queen Mary II appeared in the Telegraph, noting: "On 10 May last year The Telegraph ran a long feature on Cunard's Queen Mary II liner on the news review page. This episode looked to many like a plug for an advertiser on a page normally dedicated to serious news analysis. I again checked and certainly Telegraph competitors did not view Cunard's liner as a major news story. Cunard is an important Telegraph advertiser."

In response, the Telegraph called Oborne's statement an "astonishing and unfounded attack, full of inaccuracy and innuendo". Later that month, Telegraph editor Chris Evans invited journalists at the newspaper to contribute their thoughts on the issue. Press Gazette reported later in 2015 that Oborne had joined the Daily Mail tabloid newspaper and The Telegraph had "issued new guidelines over the way editorial and commercial staff work together".

In January 2017, the Telegraph Media Group had a higher number of upheld complaints than any other UK newspaper by its regulator IPSO. Most of these findings pertained to inaccuracy, as with other UK newspapers.

In October 2017, a number of major western news organisations whose coverage had irked Beijing were excluded from Xi Jinping's speech event launching a new politburo. However, the Daily Telegraph had been granted an invitation to the event.

In April 2019, Business Insider reported The Telegraph had partnered with Facebook to publish articles "downplaying 'technofears' and praising the company".

==== Premature obituaries ====
The paper published premature obituaries for Cockie Hoogterp, the second wife of Baron Blixen, Dave Swarbrick in 1999, and Dorothy Southworth Ritter, the widow of Tex Ritter and mother of John Ritter, in August 2001.

==== Accusation of antisemitism ====
Editors for both the Daily Telegraph and the Sunday Telegraph have been criticised by Guardian columnist Owen Jones for publishing and authoring articles which espouse Cultural Marxism, an antisemitic conspiracy theory. In 2018, Allister Heath, the editor of the Sunday Telegraph wrote that "Cultural Marxism is running rampant." Assistant comment editor of the Daily Telegraph Sherelle Jacobs also used the term in 2019. The Daily Telegraph also published an anonymous civil servant who stated: "There is a strong presence of Anglophobia, combined with cultural Marxism that runs through the civil service."

==== False allegations of Islamic extremism ====
In January 2019, the paper published an article written by Camilla Tominey titled "Police called in after Scout group run from mosque is linked to Islamic extremist and Holocaust denier" in which it was reported that the police were investigating Ahammed Hussain, the Leader of the Scout Group at the Lewisham Islamic Centre, because he had links to extremist Muslim groups that promoted terrorism and antisemitism.

In January 2020, the paper issued an official apology and accepted that the article contained many falsehoods, and that Hussain had never supported or promoted terrorism, or been antisemitic. The paper paid Hussain damages and costs. In a letter sent to Hussain's lawyers accompanying the text of their published apology, the newspaper's lawyers wrote: "The article was published by our client following receipt of information in good faith from the Scout Association and the Henry Jackson Society; nevertheless our client now accepts that the article (using that expression to refer to both print and online versions) is defamatory of your client and will apologise to him for publishing it."

==== China Watch ====
In 2016, the Hong Kong Free Press reported that The Daily Telegraph was receiving £750,000 annually to carry a supplement called 'China Watch' as part of a commercial deal with Chinese state-run newspaper China Daily. The Guardian reported in 2018 that the China Watch supplement was being carried by The Telegraph along with other newspapers of record such as The New York Times, The Wall Street Journal and Le Figaro. For a decade, The Telegraph published the supplement once a month in print, and online. In April 2020, following criticism, The Telegraph removed China Watch from its website, along with another advertisement feature section by Chinese state-run media outlet People's Daily Online. The paper had run many pieces critical of China since the start of the COVID-19 pandemic.

==== COVID-19 misinformation ====
In January 2021, the British press regulator, the Independent Press Standards Organisation, ordered The Daily Telegraph to publish a correction to two "significantly misleading" claims in a comment article published by Toby Young. The July 2020 article "When we have herd immunity Boris will face a reckoning on this pointless and damaging lockdown," which spread COVID-19 misinformation that the common cold provided "natural immunity" to COVID-19 and that London was "probably approaching herd immunity". The regulator said that a correction was appropriate rather than a more serious response due to the level of scientific uncertainty at the time the comment was published. At the time of the ruling, The Telegraph had removed the comment article but had not issued a correction.

==== Climate change ====
The Telegraph has published multiple columns and news articles which promote pseudoscientific views on climate change, and misleadingly cast the subject of climate change as a subject of active scientific debate when there is a scientific consensus on climate change. It has published columns about the "conspiracy behind the Anthropogenic Global Warming myth", described climate scientists as "white-coated prima donnas and narcissists," and claimed that "global warming causes about as much damage as benefits." In 2015, a Telegraph news article incorrectly claimed that scientists predicted a mini-ice age by 2030. Climate change denying journalist James Delingpole was first to use "Climategate" on his Telegraph blog for a manufactured controversy where emails were leaked from climate scientists ahead of the Copenhagen climate summit and misleadingly presented to give the appearance that the climate scientists were engaged in fraud.

In 2014, The Telegraph was one of several media titles to give evidence to the House of Commons Select Committee 'Communicating climate science'. The paper told MPs they believe climate change is happening and humans play a role in it. Editors told the committee, "we believe that the climate is changing, that the reason for that change includes human activity, but that human ingenuity and adaptability should not be ignored in favour of economically damaging prescriptions."

In November 2023, the journalist and climate activist group DeSmog published its judgements for coverage of environmental topics in 171 of The Telegraph's opinion pieces from April to October 2023. DeSmog stated that of these 171 pieces, 85 per cent were categorised as "anti-green", defined as "attacking climate policy, questioning climate science and ridiculing environmental groups."

==== Owen Paterson ====
The Daily Telegraph, in particular its columnist and former editor Charles Moore, were staunch supporters of Owen Paterson, a former MP and minister who resigned after it was found that he had breached advocacy rules to lobby ministers for fees. A plan to overhaul the Commons standard and spare Paterson from being suspended and a possible recall petition that follows was leaked to the newspaper and it was "approvingly" splashed across the paper's front page. Boris Johnson flew back from the COP 26 summit in Glasgow to attend a Telegraph journalists' reunion at the Garrick and left the club with Moore the same evening.

==== 2023–2024 takeover bid ====
In June 2023, The Guardian and other newspapers reported that, following a breakdown in discussions relating to a financial dispute, Lloyds Bank was planning to take control of the companies owning the Telegraph titles and the Spectator and sell them off. Representatives of the Barclay family have described the reports as "irresponsible". By 20 October, a sale of the publications had been initiated after bankers seized control. Lloyds appointed receivers and started shopping the brands to bidders.

By November, it was revealed that the bid had been agreed upon by RedBird IMI, a joint venture between RedBird Capital Partners and International Media Investments, a firm based in the United Arab Emirates and owned by Sheikh Mansour bin Zayed Al Nahyan. The bid would see the firm take over The Telegraph, while allowing the Barclay family to repay a debt of £1.2 billion to Lloyds Bank. Conservative MPs raised national security concerns, and pushed the government to investigate the bid, as the United Arab Emirates had a poor reputation for freedom of speech. Culture secretary Lucy Frazer issued a public interest intervention notice on 30 November, preventing the group from taking over without further scrutiny from the media regulator Ofcom over potential breaches of media standards. Conservative MPs also called on Deputy Prime Minister Oliver Dowden to use the National Security and Investment Act 2021 to investigate the Emirati-backed bid.

Chairman Andrew Neil threatened to quit if the sale was approved, saying: "You cannot have a major mainstream newspaper group owned by an undemocratic government or dictatorship where no one has a vote." Fraser Nelson, editor of The Spectator, which would be included in the sale, also opposed the move, saying, "the very reason why a foreign government would want to buy a sensitive asset is the very reason why a national government should be wary of selling them."

In March 2024, the Lords voted in a new law, under which restrictions were imposed on foreign governments regarding the ownership of British newspapers and magazines, including only being allowed up to a 0.1 per cent stake. In April 2024, the UK government effectively banned RedBird IMI from taking over The Telegraph and The Spectator by introducing new laws which prevented foreign governments from owning British newspapers. RedBird also confirmed it would withdraw its takeover plans, saying they were "no longer feasible".

In April 2024, RedBird IMI confirmed to put up The Telegraph for sale again and to begin open auction. However, the Abu Dhabi fund suggested that it seek to recoup the £600 million it spent acquiring the newspaper, or will otherwise retain some involvement. The Telegraph was left in limbo, as the staff remained blocked from taking strategic decisions. The owner of The New York Sun, Dovid Efune came up as a leading bidder, but struggled to take over the paper. The Columbia Journalism Review dubbed it as "the newspaper auction from hell".

In January 2025, David Castelblanco, a partner at the Abu Dhabi fund RedBird, urged The Telegraph to make significant job cuts, including over 100 non-editorial roles. He also advised the executives to halt planned editorial investments, which included expansions of the US newsroom. The intervention was likely to raise concerns about foreign interference and fuels fears of foreign influence in the decision-making process of The Telegraph. On 19 January, Sir Iain Duncan Smith stated that the UAE should not be allowed to acquire the British newspaper. He also accused the UK government of "foot-dragging" the process due to fear of upsetting the Emirates, and asked for an explanation about the Digital Markets, Competition and Consumers Act 2024. Sir Ed Davey also called for the Cultural Secretary Lisa Nandy to set a deadline for The Telegraph's sale, and urged the ministers to ensure that the Abu Dhabi fund is "not improperly meddling in the meantime".

In May 2025, Conservative MPs rebelled against their party's leadership to block Lisa Nandy's proposal allowing the UAE to acquire up to 15% of The Telegraph. This move came as RedBird Capital sought to lead a new consortium to acquire the newspaper. Lord Forsyth accused Lisa Nandy of surrendering to lobbying, raising concerns over foreign state influence, a potential risk to press freedom and independent journalism. Despite the objections, the deal proceeded, and on 23 May, RedBird IMI agreed to acquire The Telegraph for £500 million ($673 million). On 14 November 2025, RedBird dropped their bid to buy the papers due to negative media coverage related to the deal and regulatory scrutiny in the UK. A deal that was struck on 22 November 2025 would see its ownership transferred to Daily Mail owner DMGT.

==== UK anti-trans movement ====
In May 2026, a report by Amnesty International found that The Telegraph was one of the primary newspapers - along with The Guardian, The Times, and The Sun - involved in manufacturing the British anti-transgender movement, via a years-long campaign designed to frame transgender people as "involved in controversy, demanding or aggressive and with a propensity to be offended" while simultaneously minimising the impact of transgender voices and magnifying the impact of anti-trans figures and groups.

==== Acquisition by Axel Springer ====
In March 2026, it was announced that the Telegraph Media Group would be acquired for £575 million by the German company Axel Springer SE, which owns numerous news brands. The transaction involved purchasing the shares of the previous owner, RedBird IMI, after its own takeover attempt had failed due to political concerns raised by the UK government. Axel Springer CEO Mathias Döpfner described the acquisition as a long‑standing goal and stated that the company intends to preserve The Daily Telegraph's editorial character while advancing its international expansion, particularly within the English‑speaking world. The acquisition by Axel Springer was completed on 30 June 2026.

Axel Springer CEO Döpfner expressed a desire for the Telegraph to become a global centre-right news platform, citing in particular the US, Asia and Latin America areas. A spokesperson said US expansion was "a top priority since we see a lot of potential".

In November 2026, The Guardian reported that The Daily Telegraph was terminating its columnist contract with Reform UK party leader Nigel Farage. No official reason was given, and sources gave conflicting reasons, either Farage had resigned or that it was an Axel Springer decision. Axel Springer had disclosed plans for redundancies across the newspaper, including in the news, sports and culture sections.

== Circulation ==
It had a circulation of 270,000 in 1856, and 240,000 in 1863. It had a circulation of 1,393,094 in 1968, and 1,358,875 in 1978. It had a circulation of 1,439,000 in 1980, and 1,235,000 in 1984. It had a circulation of 1,133,173 in 1988. The paper had a circulation of 363,183 in December 2018, not including bulk sales. It descended further until it withdrew from newspaper circulation audits in 2020. The bulk of its readership has moved online; the Telegraph Media Group reported a subscription number of 1,035,710 for December 2023, composed of 117,586 for its print edition, 688,012 for its digital version and 230,112 for other subscriptions.

== Political stance ==
The Daily Telegraph supported Whig, and moderate liberal ideas, before the late 1870s. The Daily Telegraph is politically conservative and has endorsed the Conservative Party at every UK general election since 1945. The personal links between the paper's editors and the leadership of the Conservative Party, along with the paper's generally right-wing stance and influence over Conservative activists, have led the paper commonly to be referred to, especially in Private Eye, as the Torygraph.

When the Barclay brothers purchased the Telegraph Group for around £665 million in late June 2004, Sir David Barclay suggested that The Daily Telegraph might no longer be the "house newspaper" of the Conservatives in the future. In an interview with The Guardian, he said: "Where the government are right we shall support them." The editorial board endorsed the Conservative Party in the 2005 general election. During the 2014 Scottish independence referendum, the paper supported the Better Together "No" Campaign. Alex Salmond, the former leader of the SNP, called The Telegraph "extreme" on Question Time in September 2015. In the 2016 United Kingdom European Union membership referendum, it endorsed voting to leave the EU.

In December 2015, The Daily Telegraph was fined £30,000 for "sending an unsolicited email to hundreds of thousands of its subscribers, urging them to vote for the Conservatives." During the 2019 Conservative Party leadership election, The Daily Telegraph endorsed their former columnist Boris Johnson. In 2019, former columnist Graham Norton, who had left the paper in late 2018, said "about a year before I left, it took a turn" and criticised it for "toxic" political stances, namely for a piece defending US Supreme Court then-nominee Brett Kavanaugh and for being "a mouthpiece for Boris Johnson" whose columns were allegedly published with "no fact-checking at all".

In March 2026, the Independent Press Standards Organisation upheld a complaint that The Telegraph published an article purportedly about a family that did not in reality exist, by inaccurately claiming that the family were placed in financial difficulty by the Labour government's recent addition of VAT to private school fees. The story had been placed with a reporter by a public relations company working for a financial planning company.

=== LGBT+ issues ===
In 2012, prior to the legalisation of same-sex marriage in the United Kingdom, The Telegraph published an editorial stating that it was a "pointless distraction" as "many [gay couples] already avail themselves of the civil partnerships introduced by Labour". The Telegraph wrote in another editorial that same year that it feared that changing "the law on gay marriage risks inflaming anti-homosexual bigotry".

In 2015, following Sir Elton John's boycott of Dolce & Gabbana after its founders criticised IVF and same-sex adoptions, former editor Charles Moore wrote an article in the paper saying a "gay rights sharia" was dictating what the LGBT+ community should believe. He suggested the public reaction to the comments was designed to "silence debate" and prevent support for "traditional views of parenthood". Moore also said "adult transgender mutilation" should not be celebrated. Moore has previously expressed his views that civil partnerships achieved a "balance" for heterosexual and homosexual couples. In 2013, he wrote: "Respectable people are truly terrified of being thought anti-homosexual. In a way, they are right to be, because attacking people for their personal preferences can be a nasty thing."

In 2016, Michael Segalov wrote an article for The Telegraph saying then-Prime Minister Theresa May needed to be "serious about LGBT equality". After the Orlando nightclub shooting in June 2016, The Telegraph published an article by Stonewall CEO Ruth Hunt that said the attack on a gay nightclub "grew out of everyday homophobia". The same year, Telegraph Executive Director Lord Black was awarded Peer of the Year at the 2016 PinkNews Awards for his campaigning on LGBT rights. The newspaper also featured an article written by Maria Munir about their experience coming out to President Barack Obama as non-binary. In 2017, Rachel Cunliffe wrote in the paper that "bathroom bills" in Texas – which were criticised as being transphobic – were "a Kafkaesque state intrusion".

PinkNews has criticised The Telegraph for its coverage of trans people, suggesting several articles and a billboard campaign were either misleading or transphobic. In 2017, the newspaper published an article by Allison Pearson titled: "Will our spineless politicians' love affair with LGBT ever end?", which argued that asking NHS patients their sexual orientation was unnecessary. In 2018, it published another article by Pearson headlined "The tyranny of the transgender minority has got to be stopped." In 2025, two members of the campaign group Trans Kids Deserve Better climbed The Telegraph's office building to protest media coverage of trans issues, saying the paper had published 150 articles about trans people and had treated trans children as "just another scapegoat".

== Sister publications ==
=== The Sunday Telegraph ===
The Daily Telegraph's sister Sunday paper was founded in 1961. The writer Sir Peregrine Worsthorne is probably the best known journalist associated with the title (1961–1997), eventually being editor for three years from 1986. In 1989, the Sunday title was briefly merged into a seven-day operation under Max Hastings's overall control. Circulation of The Sunday Telegraph in July 2010 was 505,214 (ABC).

=== Young Telegraph ===
Young Telegraph was a weekly section of The Daily Telegraph published as a 14-page supplement in the weekend edition of the newspaper. Young Telegraph featured a mixture of news, features, cartoon strips and product reviews aimed at 8–12-year-olds. It was edited by Damien Kelleher (1993–1997) and Kitty Melrose (1997–1999). Launched in 1990, the award-winning supplement also ran original serialised stories featuring popular brands such as Young Indiana Jones and the British children's sitcom Maid Marian and Her Merry Men. It featured the cartoon "Mad Gadget" by Chris Winn, and a computer game Mad Gadget: Lost In Time (1993) and a book Mad Gadget: Gadget Mad (1995) were produced.

In 1995, an interactive spin-off called Electronic Young Telegraph (EYT) was launched on floppy disk. Described as an interactive computer magazine for children, Electronic Young Telegraph was edited by Adam Tanswell, who led the relaunch of the product on CD-Rom in 1998. Electronic Young Telegraph featured original content including interactive quizzes, informative features and computer games, as well as entertainment news and reviews. It was later re-branded as T:Drive in 1999.

=== Website ===
Telegraph.co.uk is the online version of the newspaper. It uses the banner title The Telegraph and includes articles from the print editions of The Daily Telegraph and The Sunday Telegraph, as well as web-only content such as breaking news, features, picture galleries and blogs. It was named UK Consumer Website of the Year in 2007 and Digital Publisher of the year in 2009 by the Association of Online Publishers. The site is overseen by Kate Day, digital director of Telegraph Media Group. Other staff include Shane Richmond, head of technology (editorial), and Ian Douglas, head of digital production. Starting in November 2012, international customers accessing the Telegraph.co.uk site would have to sign up for a subscription package. Visitors had access to 20 free articles a month before having to subscribe for unlimited access. In March 2013, the pay meter system was also rolled out in the UK.

The site, which has been the focus of the group's efforts to create an integrated news operation producing content for print and online from the same newsroom, completed a relaunch during 2008 involving the use of the Escenic content management system, popular among northern European and Scandinavian newspaper groups. Telegraph TV is a video on demand service run by The Daily Telegraph and the Sunday Telegraph. It is hosted on The Telegraph's website, telegraph.co.uk. Telegraph.co.uk became the most popular UK newspaper site in April 2008. It was overtaken by Guardian.co.uk in April 2009 and later by "Mail Online". In December 2010, "Telegraph.co.uk" was the third most visited British newspaper website with 1.7 million daily browsers compared to 2.3 million for "Guardian.co.uk" and nearly 3 million for "Mail Online". In October 2023, "Telegraph.co.uk" was the tenth most visited UK newspaper site, with 13.8 million monthly visits, compared to the most popular, the BBC, with 38.3 million.

==== History ====
The website was launched, under the name electronic telegraph at midday on 15 November 1994 at the headquarters of The Daily Telegraph at Canary Wharf in London Docklands with Ben Rooney as its first editor. It was Europe's first daily web-based newspaper. At this time, the modern internet was still in its infancy, with as few as 10,000 websites estimated to have existed at the time – compared to more than 100 billion by 2009. In 1994, only around 1% of the British population (some 600,000 people) had internet access at home, compared to more than 80% in 2009.

Initially, the site published only the top stories from the print edition of the newspaper but it gradually increased its coverage until virtually all of the newspaper was carried online and the website was also publishing original material. The website, hosted on a Sun Microsystems Sparc 20 server and connected via a 64 kbit/s leased line from Demon Internet, was edited by Ben Rooney.

An early coup for the site was the publication of articles by Ambrose Evans-Pritchard on Bill Clinton and the Whitewater controversy. The availability of the articles online brought a large American audience to the site. In 1997, the Clinton administration issued a 331-page report that accused Evans-Pritchard of peddling "right-wing inventions". Derek Bishton, who by then had succeeded Rooney as editor, later wrote: "In the days before ET it would have been highly unlikely that anyone in the US would have been aware of Evans-Pritchard's work – and certainly not to the extent that the White House would be forced to issue such a lengthy rebuttal." Bishton, who later became consulting editor for Telegraph Media Group, was followed as editor by Richard Burton, who was made redundant in August 2006. Edward Roussel replaced Burton.

==== My Telegraph ====
My Telegraph offers a platform for readers to have their own blog, save articles, and network with other readers. Launched in May 2007, My Telegraph won a Cross Media Award from international newspaper organisation IFRA in October 2007. One of the judges, Robert Cauthorn, described the project as "the best deployment of blogging yet seen in any newspaper anywhere in the world".

== Notable stories ==
In December 2010, Telegraph reporters posing as constituents secretly recorded Business Secretary Vince Cable. In an undisclosed part of the transcript given to the BBC's Robert Peston by a whistleblower unhappy that The Telegraph had not published Cable's comments in full, Cable stated in reference to Rupert Murdoch's News Corporation takeover bid for BSkyB, "I have declared war on Mr Murdoch and I think we are going to win." Following this revelation, Cable had his responsibility for media affairs – including ruling on Murdoch's takeover plans – withdrawn from his role as business secretary.

In May 2011, the Press Complaints Commission upheld a complaint regarding The Telegraph's use of subterfuge: "On this occasion, the commission was not convinced that the public interest was such as to justify proportionately this level of subterfuge." In July 2011, a firm of private investigators hired by The Telegraph to track the source of the leak concluded "strong suspicion" that two former Telegraph employees who had moved to News International, one of them Will Lewis, had gained access to the transcript and audio files and leaked them to Peston.

=== 2009 MP expenses scandal ===
In May 2009, The Daily Telegraph obtained a full copy of all the expenses claims of British Members of Parliament. The Telegraph began publishing, in instalments from 8 May 2009, certain MPs' expenses. The Telegraph justified the publication of the information because it contended that the official information due to be released would have omitted key information about redesignating of second-home nominations. This led to a number of high-profile resignations from both the ruling Labour administration and the Conservative opposition.

=== 2016 Sam Allardyce investigation ===
In September 2016, Telegraph reporters posing as businessmen filmed England manager Sam Allardyce offering to give advice on how to get around on FA rules on player third party ownership and negotiating a £400,000 deal. The investigation saw Allardyce leave his job by mutual consent on 27 September and making the statement "entrapment has won".

=== 2025 BBC Gaza–Israel coverage memo leak ===
In November 2025, The Daily Telegraph published details of a leaked internal memo written by Michael Prescott, a former independent adviser to the BBC's Editorial Guidelines and Standards Board. The memo alleged bias in the BBC's reporting, including its coverage of the Israel–Hamas war. Prescott cited disparities between the English-language website and BBC Arabic in reporting on the October 7 attacks, differences in tone and selective emphasis on stories critical of Israel, and what he described as inaccurate reporting on Palestinian casualty figures and the risk of child starvation under Israel's aid blockade. The memo also examined coverage of a Trump Panorama segment and transgender issues. The ensuing media and political scrutiny of the BBC's editorial practices led to the resignations of senior BBC executives.

== Reception and historical value ==
Denise Bates included The Daily Telegraph in a list of national newspapers which, because of the quality of their reporting, or the extent of their audience, stand out and are likely to be used for historical research. The editors of Encyclopaedia Britannica said that The Daily Telegraph has consistently had a "high standard of reporting". The Daily Telegraph was renowned for its foreign correspondents. According to the DNCJ, during the nineteenth century, The Daily Telegraph had excellent coverage of the arts. In 1989, Nicholas and Erbach said that The Daily Telegraph is factually accurate, and that its reputation for being so extends outside the country.

=== Awards ===
The Daily Telegraph has been named the National Newspaper of the Year in 2009, 1996 and 1993, while The Sunday Telegraph won the same award in 1999. Its investigation on the 2009 expenses scandal was named the "Scoop of the Year" in 2009, with William Lewis winning "Journalist of the Year". The Telegraph won "Team of the Year" in 2004 for its coverage of the Iraq War. The paper also won "Columnist of the Year" three years' running from 2002 to 2004: Zoë Heller (2002), Robert Harris (2003) and Boris Johnson (2004).

== Charity and fundraising work ==
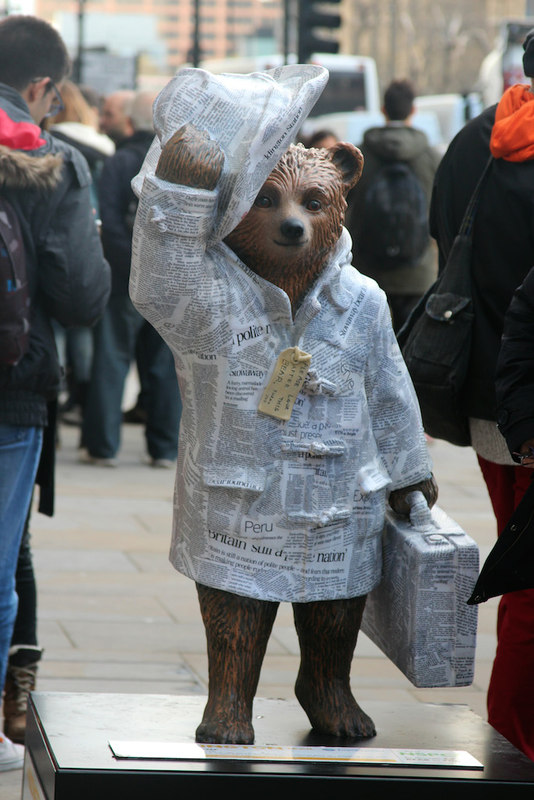
The Telegraph designed Paddington Bear statue—themed "Good News Bear"—in London, auctioned to raise funds for the NSPCC.

In 1979, following a letter in The Daily Telegraph and a Government report highlighting the shortfall in care available for premature babies, Bliss, the special care baby charity, was founded. In 2009, as part of the Bliss 30th birthday celebrations, the charity was chosen as one of four beneficiaries of the newspaper's Christmas Charity Appeal. In February 2010, a cheque was presented to Bliss for £120,000.

In 2014, The Telegraph designed a newspaper-themed Paddington Bear statue, one of fifty located around London prior to the release of the film Paddington, which was auctioned to raise funds for the National Society for the Prevention of Cruelty to Children (NSPCC).

== Notable people ==
=== Editors ===
Name	Tenure
Thornton Leigh Hunt	1855 to 1873
Edwin Arnold	1873 to 1888
John le Sage	1888 to 1923
Fred Miller	1923 to 1924
Arthur Watson	1924 to 1950
Colin Coote	1950 to 1964
Maurice Green	1964 to 1974
Bill Deedes	1974 to 1986
Max Hastings	1986 to 1995
Charles Moore	1995 to 2003
Martin Newland	2003 to 2005
John Bryant	2005 to 2007
William Lewis	2007 to 2009
Tony Gallagher	2009 to 2013
Jason Seiken	2013 to 2014
Chris Evans	2014 to present

=== Notable columnists and journalists ===
- Katharine Birbalsingh, columnist
- Jamie Carragher, columnist
- Dia Chakravarty, columnist
- Robbie Collin, film critic
- Michael Deacon, columnist
- Edward Dicey
- David Eimer, foreign correspondent
- William Hague, columnist
- Simon Heffer, columnist
- Roger Highfield, former science editor
- Boris Johnson, former political columnist
- Herbert Hughes, music critic, 1911–1932
- Anthony Loyd, one-time war correspondent
- Hugh Massingberd, obituaries editor, 1986-94
- Charles Moore, columnist
- Anne-Elisabeth Moutet, columnist
- Andrew Orlowski, business and technology columnist
- J. H. B. Peel, columnist
- George Augustus Sala
- Clement Scott
- Peter Simple, the pseudonym of Michael Wharton, who wrote a humorous column, "Way of the World", from 1957 to 2006.
- Serena Sinclair, former fashion editor
- Mark Steyn, former columnist
- Zoe Strimpel, lifestyle columnist
- Norman Tebbit, columnist
- Camilla Tominey, associate editor
- Auberon Waugh, a previous columnist
- Diane Willman, started her career here

== See also ==
- List of the oldest newspapers
- History of journalism
- Newspaper of record
- List of newspapers in Britain
