= Maximilien Robespierre =

French lawyer and statesman (1758–1794)

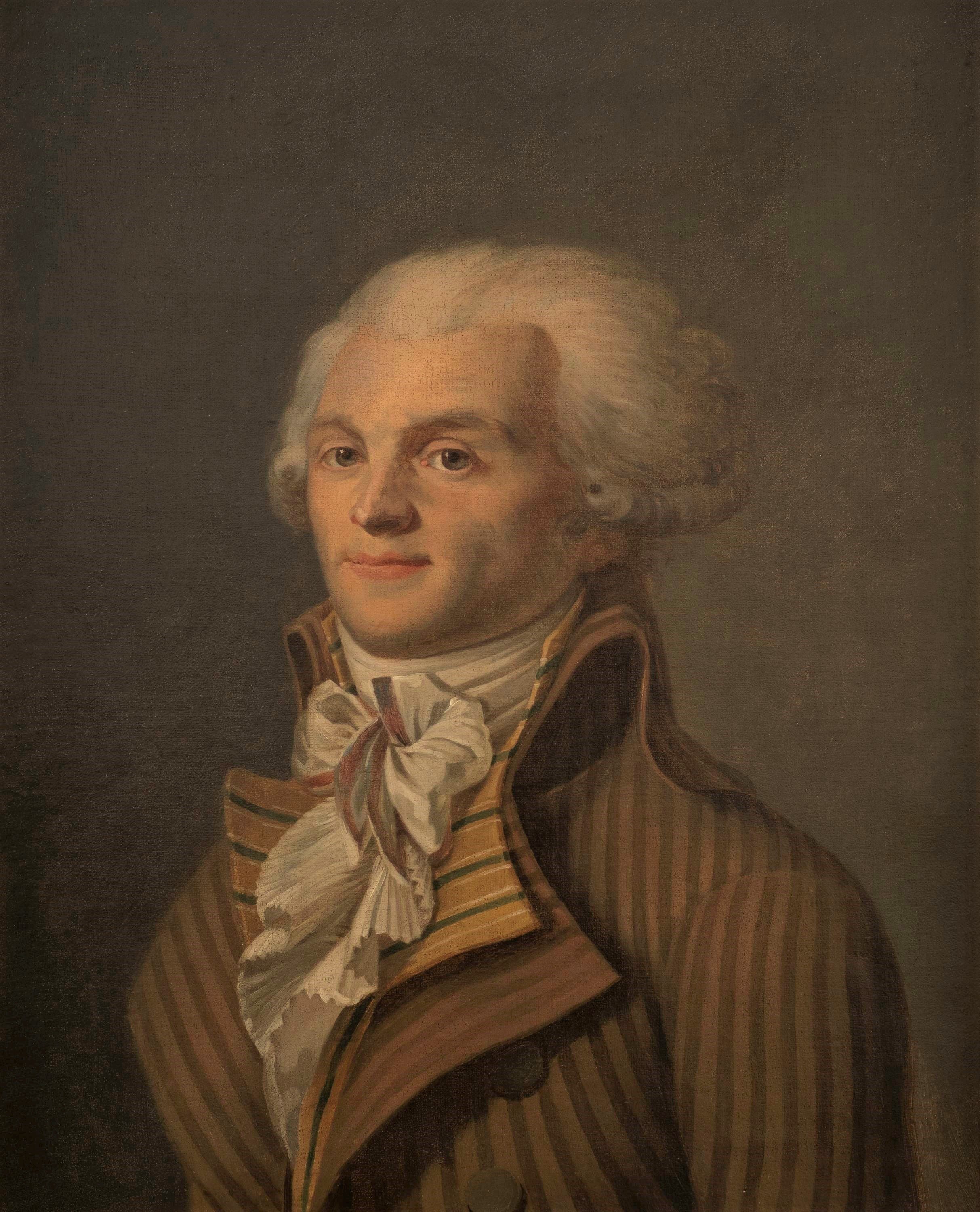
- c. 1790 portrait

25th & 44th President of the National Convention
- In office 4 June 1794 – 19 June 1794
- Preceded by: Claude-Antoine Prieur-Duvernois
- Succeeded by: Élie Lacoste
- In office 22 August 1793 – 7 September 1793
- Preceded by: Marie-Jean Hérault de Séchelles
- Succeeded by: Jacques-Nicolas Billaud-Varenne

Member of the Committee of Public Safety
- In office 27 July 1793 – 27 July 1794
- Preceded by: Thomas-Augustin de Gasparin
- Succeeded by: Jacques Nicolas Billaud-Varenne
- In office 25 March 1793 – 3 April 1793; Member of the Committee of General Defence

President of the Jacobin Club
- In office 7 August 1793 – 28 August 1793
- In office 31 March 1790 – 3 June 1790

Deputy of the National Convention
- In office 20 September 1792 – 27 July 1794
- Constituency: Paris

Deputy of the National Constituent Assembly
- In office 9 July 1789 – 30 September 1791
- Constituency: Artois

Deputy of the National Assembly
- In office 17 June 1789 – 9 July 1789
- Constituency: Artois

Deputy to the Estates General for the Third Estate
- In office 6 May 1789 – 16 June 1789
- Constituency: Artois

Personal details
- Born: Maximilien François Marie Isidore de Robespierre; 6 May 1758 Arras, Artois, Kingdom of France
- Died: 28 July 1794 (aged 36) Place de la Révolution, Paris, France
- Cause of death: Execution by guillotine
- Resting place: Parisian Catacombs, Paris, France
- Party: The Mountain (1792–1794)
- Other political affiliations: Jacobin Club (1789–1794)
- Education: University of Paris
- Profession: Lawyer; politician

Maximilien François Marie Isidore de Robespierre (/ˈroʊbzpjɛər/; French: [maksimiljɛ̃ ʁɔbɛspjɛʁ]; 6 May 1758 – 28 July 1794) was a French lawyer and statesman, widely recognised as one of the most influential figures of the French Revolution. Robespierre fervently campaigned for the voting rights of all men and their unimpeded admission to the National Guard. Additionally, he advocated the right to petition, the right to bear arms in self-defence, and the abolition of the Atlantic slave trade.

A radical Jacobin leader, Robespierre was elected as a deputy to the National Convention in September 1792, and in July 1793, he was appointed a member of the Committee of Public Safety. Robespierre faced growing disillusionment with other revolutionaries which led him to argue for the harsh measures of the Reign of Terror. Increasingly, members of the Convention turned against him, and accusations of excesses came to a head on 9 Thermidor. Robespierre was arrested with around 90 others—notably Louis Antoine de Saint-Just, Georges Couthon, and Augustin Robespierre—and was executed without trial.

A deeply divisive figure during his lifetime, Robespierre's views and policies continue to evoke controversy. His legacy has been heavily influenced by his actual and perceived participation in repression of the Revolution's opponents, but he is notable for his progressive views for the time. Academic and popular discourse continues to engage in debates surrounding his legacy and reputation, particularly his ideas of virtue in regard to the revolution and its violence.

== Early life ==
Maximilien de Robespierre was baptised on 6 May 1758 in Arras, Artois (modern day Hauts-de-France). (Note: His family has been traced back to the 15th century in Vaudricourt, Pas-de-Calais.) His father, François Maximilien Barthélémy de Robespierre, a lawyer, married Jacqueline Marguerite Carrault, the daughter of a brewer, in January 1758. Maximilien, the eldest of four children, was born four months later. His siblings were Charlotte Robespierre, (Note: For some time Marie Marguerite Charlotte de Robespierre was betrothed to Joseph Fouché, but he moved to Nantes where he married in September 1792. Charlotte never married and died aged 74.) Henriette Robespierre, (Note: Baptized Henriette Eulalie Françoise de Robespierre, was educated with Charlotte at the couvent des Manarres in Tournai and died in 1780.) and Augustin Robespierre.

Robespierre's mother died on 16 July 1764, (Note: Various citations including Shulim (1972) "The Youthful Robespierre and His Ambivalence Toward the Ancien Régime." Eighteenth-Century Studies, 399. Her burial is recorded in Paroisse Saint Aubert (Arras, Pas-de-Calais). Sépultures (1672–1775), np [image 929/967]. AD 62 Arras 5 MIR 041/8) after delivering a stillborn son at age 29. Charlotte's memoirs indicate that she believed that the death of their mother had a major effect on her brother. About three years after the death of his wife, their father left the children in Arras. (Note: Returning at intervals, living in Mannheim around 1770, he was buried on 6 November 1777 in the Salvatorkirche in Munich.) Maximilien and his brother were raised by their maternal grandparents and his sisters were raised by their unmarried paternal aunts.

Demonstrating literacy at an early age, Maximilien commenced his education at the Arras College when he was eight. In October 1769, recommended by the bishop Louis-Hilaire de Conzié, he secured a scholarship at the prestigious Collège Louis-le-Grand in Paris. Among his peers were Camille Desmoulins and Stanislas Fréron. During his schooling, he developed a profound admiration for the Roman Republic and the rhetorical skills of Cicero, Cato and Lucius Junius Brutus. In 1776 he earned the first prize for rhetoric.

His appreciation for the classics inspired him to aspire to Roman virtues, particularly the embodiment of Rousseau's citizen-soldier. Robespierre was drawn to the concepts of the influential philosophe regarding political reforms expounded in his work, The Social Contract. Aligning with Rousseau, he considered the general will of the people as the foundation of political legitimacy. While some claim that Robespierre coincidentally met Rousseau before the latter's death, others argue that this account was apocryphal.

== Formative years, 1780–1789 ==
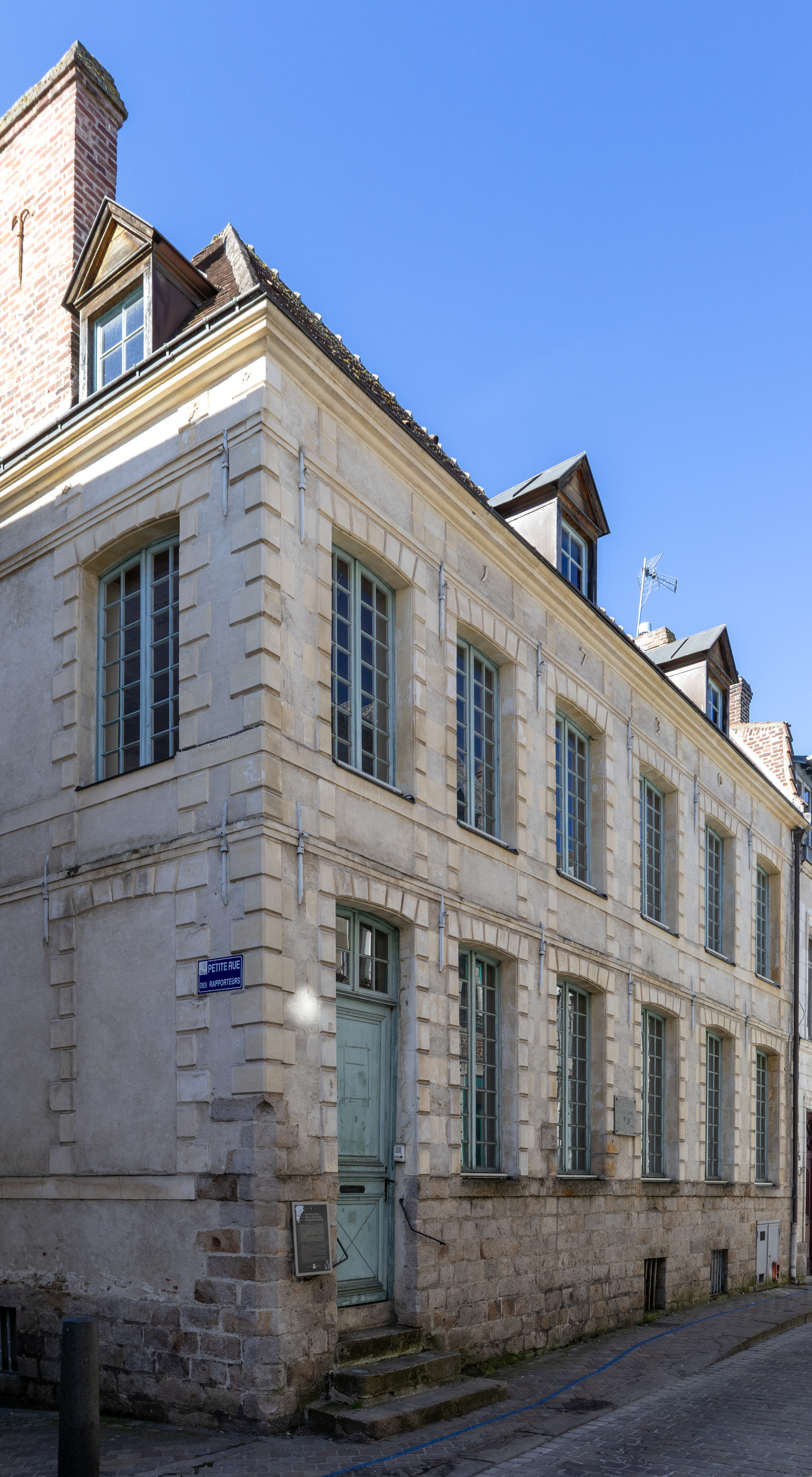
Between 1787 and 1789 Robespierre lived in this house, now on Rue Maximilien de Robespierre

During his three-year study of law at the Sorbonne, Robespierre distinguished himself academically, culminating in his graduation in July 1780, where he received a special prize of 600 livres for his exceptional academic achievements and exemplary conduct. Admitted to the bar, he was appointed as one of the five judges in the local criminal court in March 1782. However, Robespierre soon resigned, due to his ethical discomfort in adjudicating capital cases, stemming from his opposition to the death penalty.

Robespierre was elected to the literary Academy of Arras in November 1783. The following year, the Academy of Metz honoured him with a medal for his essay pondering collective punishment, thus establishing him as a literary figure. (Pierre Louis de Lacretelle and Robespierre shared the prize.)

In 1786 Robespierre passionately addressed inequality before the law, criticising the indignities faced by illegitimate or natural children, and later denouncing practices like lettres de cachet (imprisonment without a trial) and the marginalisation of women in academic circles. Robespierre's social circle expanded to include influential figures such as the lawyer Martial Herman, the officer and engineer Lazare Carnot and the teacher Joseph Fouché, all of whom would hold significance in his later endeavours. His role as the secretary of the Academy of Arras connected him with François-Noël Babeuf, a revolutionary land surveyor in the region.

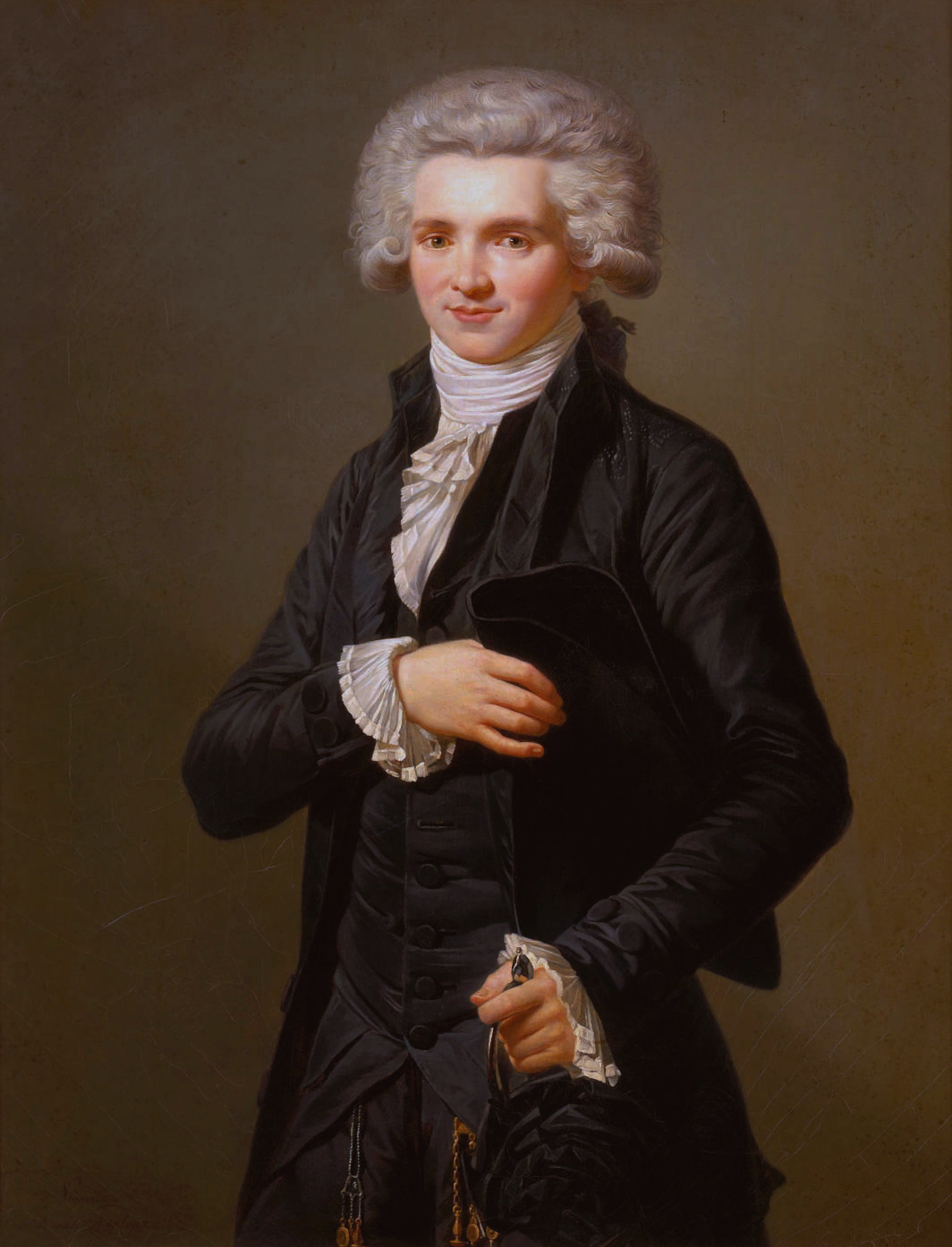
Maximilien de Robespierre dressed as deputy of the Third Estate by Pierre-Roch Vigneron, c. 1790 (Palace of Versailles)

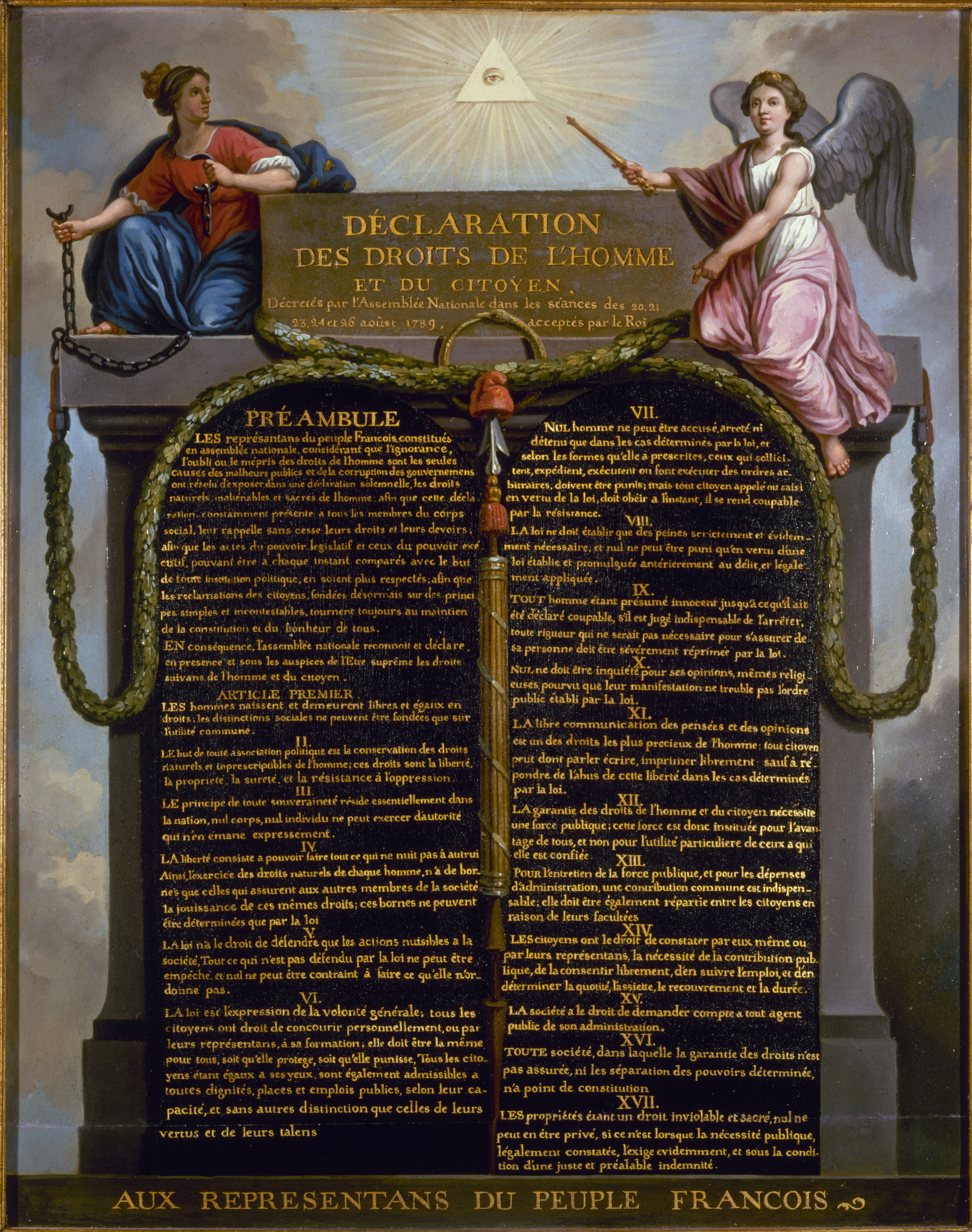
The revolutionary decrees passed by the Assembly in August 1789 culminated in the Declaration of the Rights of Man and of the Citizen.

In August 1788, King Louis XVI summoned the Estates-General to convene on 1 May 1789. Robespierre advocated in his Address to the Nation of Artois that following the customary mode of election by the members of the provincial estates would fail to adequately represent the people of France in the new Estates-General. In his electoral district, Arras, Robespierre began to assert his influence in politics through his Notice to the Residents of the Countryside in 1789, targeting local authorities and garnering the support of rural electors. (Note: According to apocryphal Mémoires authentiques he was elected as president of the Arras Academy early 1789.) On 26 April 1789, Robespierre secured his place as one of 16 deputies representing French Flanders in the Estates-General.

== 1789 ==
On 6 June, Robespierre delivered his introductory speech in the Estates General, targeting the hierarchical structure of the church. His impassioned oratory prompted observers to comment, "This young man is as yet inexperienced; unaware of when to cease, but possesses an eloquence that sets him apart from the rest." By 13 June, Robespierre aligned with deputies, who later proclaimed themselves the National Assembly, asserting representation for 96% of the nation. On 13 July, the National Assembly proposed reinstating the "bourgeois militia" in Paris to quell the unrest. The following day, the populace demanded weapons and stormed both the Hôtel des Invalides and the Bastille. The local militia transitioned into the National Guard, a move that distanced the most impoverished citizens from active involvement. During an altercation with Lally-Tollendal who advocated law and order, Robespierre reminded the citizens of their "recent defense of liberty", which paradoxically restricted their access to it.

In October, alongside Louvet, Robespierre supported Maillard following the Women's March on Versailles. On 22 October, while the Constituent Assembly debated property requirements for voting and eligibility for public office, Robespierre was among the few deputies who opposed them. Through December and January Robespierre notably drew attention to marginalised groups, particularly Protestants, Jews, people of African descent, domestic servants, and actors. A frequent orator in the Assembly, Robespierre championed the ideals in the Declaration of the Rights of Man and of the Citizen, but his views rarely garnered majority support among fellow deputies.

Despite his commitment to democratic principles, Robespierre did not adopt the change of dress influenced by the Revolution; instead he persistently donned knee-breeches and retained a meticulously groomed appearance with a curled, perfumed, and powdered wig tied in a queue in line with the old-fashioned style of the 18th century. Some accounts described him as "nervous, timid, and suspicious".

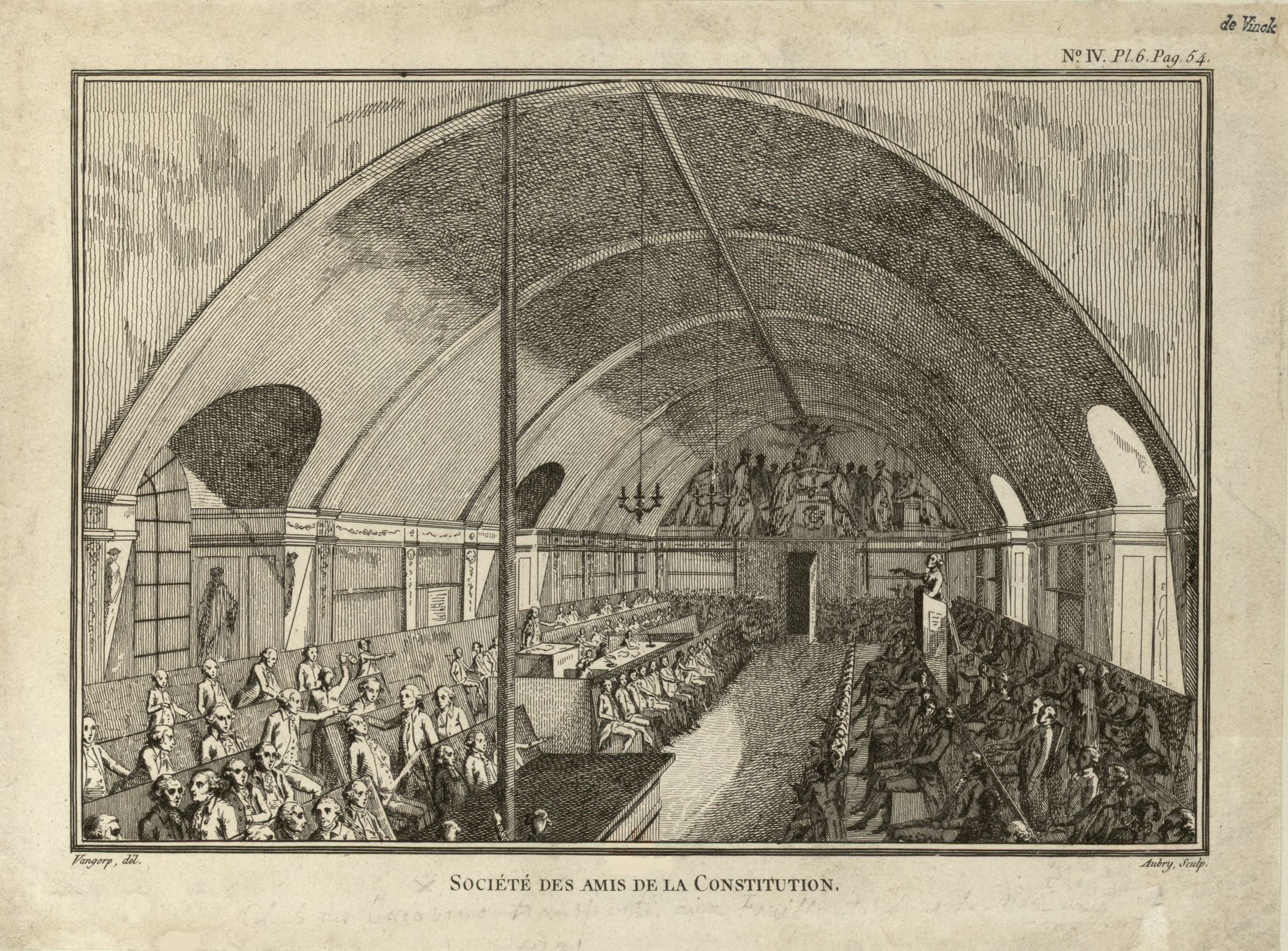
Jacobin Club in February 1791.

Following the forcible relocation of the King and National Constituent Assembly from Versailles to Paris, Robespierre lived at 30 Rue de Saintonge in Le Marais, a district with relatively wealthy inhabitants. He shared an apartment on the third floor with Pierre Villiers who was his secretary for several months. Robespierre associated with the new Society of the Friends of the Constitution, commonly known as the Jacobin Club. Among these 1,200 men, Robespierre found a sympathetic audience. Equality before the law was the keystone of the Jacobin ideology. Beginning in October and continuing through January he made several speeches in response to proposals for property qualifications for voting and officeholding under the proposed constitution. This was a position he vigorously opposed, arguing in a speech on 22 October the position that he derived from Rousseau:

... sovereignty resides in the people, in all the individuals of the people. Each individual therefore has the right to participate in making the law which governs him and in the administration of the public good which is his own. If not, it is not true that all men are equal in rights, that every man is a citizen.

== 1790 ==
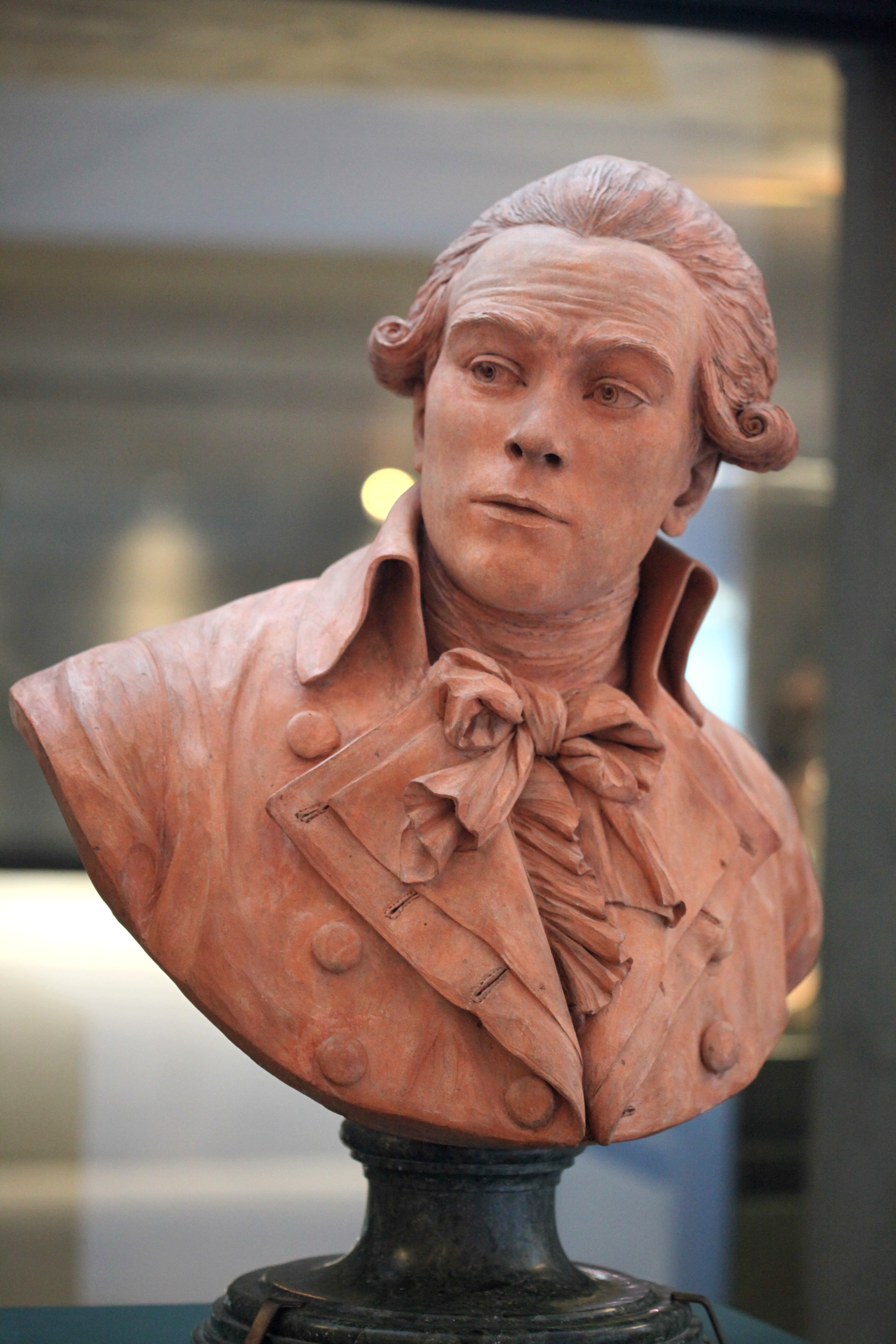
Terracotta bust of Robespierre by Deseine (Musée de la Révolution française)

During the continuing debate on suffrage, Robespierre ended his speech of 25 January 1790 with a demand that "all Frenchmen must be admissible to all public positions without any other distinction than that of virtues and talents." On 31 March 1790 he was elected as president of the Jacobin Club. Robespierre supported the cooperation of all the National Guards in a general federation on 11 May. On 19 June he was elected secretary of the National Assembly. In July Robespierre demanded "fraternal equality" in salaries. Before the end of the year, he was seen as one of the leaders of the small body of the extreme left of the Assembly, known as "the thirty voices".

On 5 December 1790, Robespierre circulated a printed speech on the organisation of the National Guard, which he had been unable to deliver before the National Assembly. "To be armed for personal defence is the right of every man, to be armed to defend freedom and the existence of the common fatherland is the right of every citizen." Robespierre also coined the famous motto "Liberté, égalité, fraternité" by adding the word fraternity on the flags of the National Guard. (Note: The first use of the motto "Liberté, égalité, et fraternité" was in Robespierre's speech "On the organisation of the National Guard" on 5 December 1790, article XVI, and disseminated widely throughout France by Camille Desmoulin in his journal "Les révolutions de France et de Brabant" among the associated Societies.)

== 1791 ==
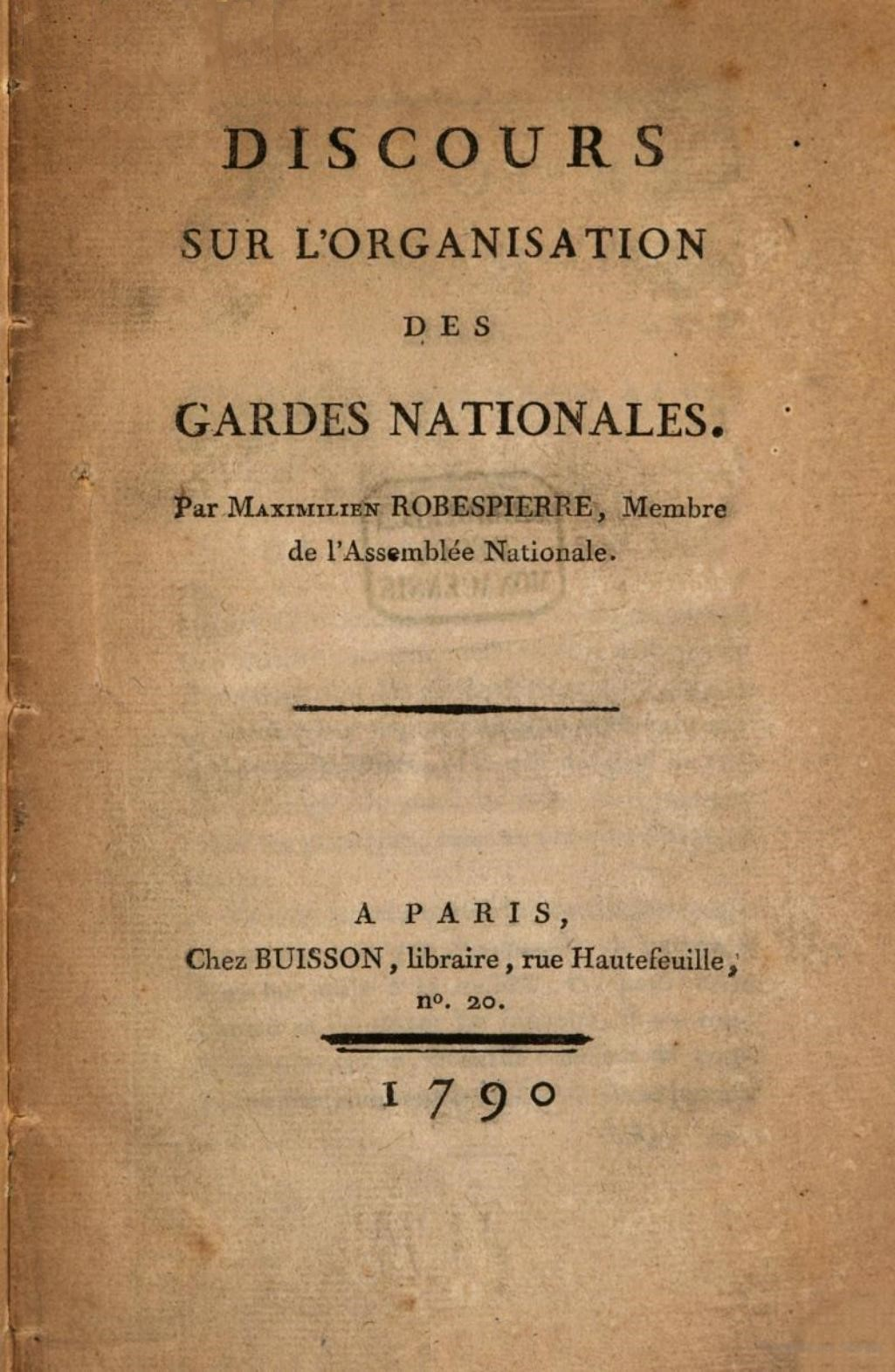
Discours sur l'organisation des Gardes Nationales.

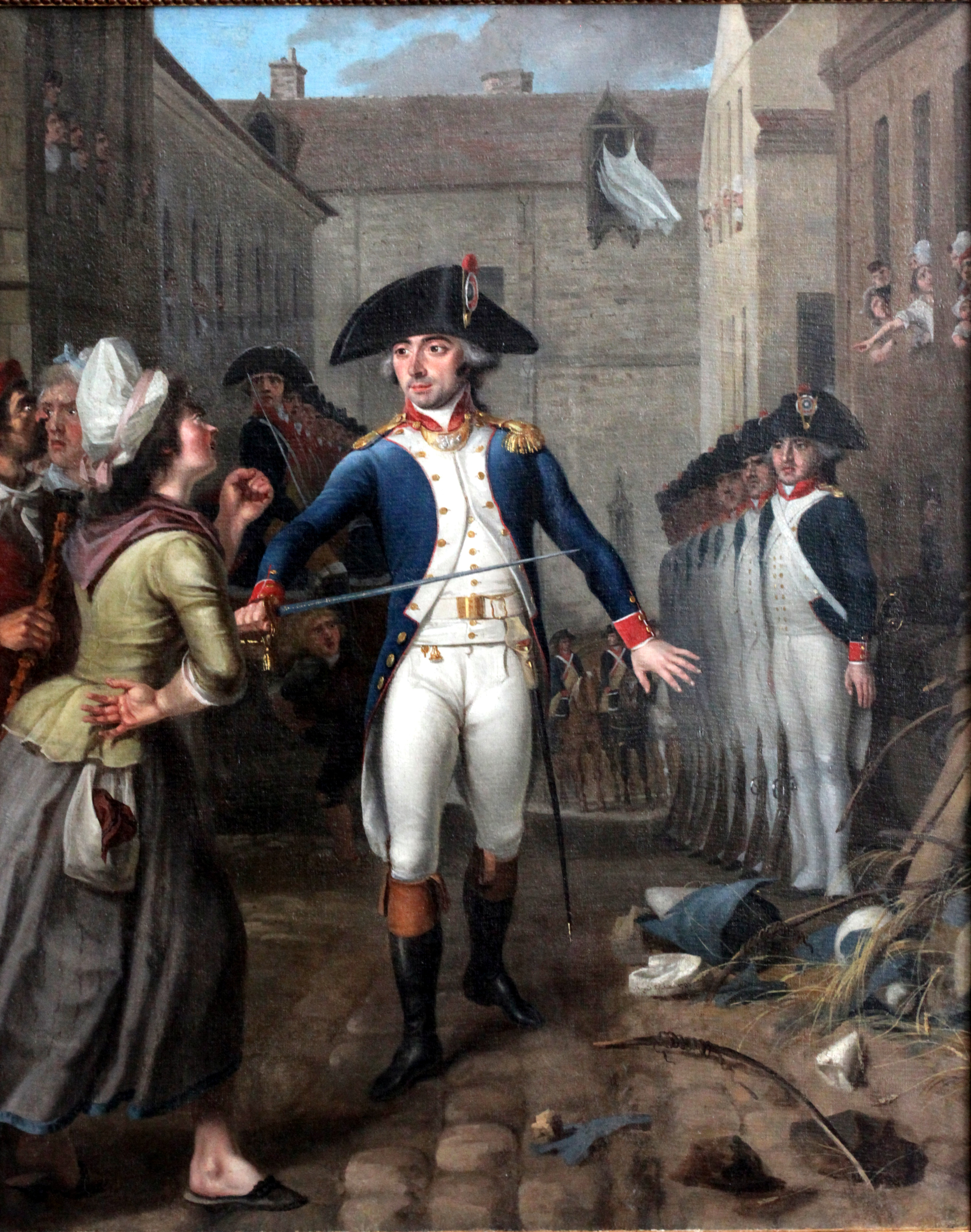
The National Guard during the riots in Paris in January 1791

In 1791, Robespierre gave 328 speeches, almost one a day. On 28 January, he called for the National Guard to be supplied with arms and ammunition, demanded increased weapons production, and proposed a temporary ban on arms exports. On 27 and 28 April, he opposed plans to restrict membership of the National Guard to active citizens. He argued that all citizens should be entitled to serve and that the National Guard should remain independent of the executive power, defending liberty rather than threatening it. Jean Jaurès argued that Robespierre's demand to arm all citizens was politically more radical than granting workers the right to combine or strike.

In the same month Robespierre published a pamphlet in which he argued the case for universal manhood suffrage. On 15 May, the Constituent Assembly declared full and equal citizenship for all free people of colour. In the debate Robespierre said: "I feel that I am here to defend the rights of men; I cannot consent to any amendment and I ask that the principle be adopted in its entirety." He descended from the rostrum in the middle of the repeated applause of the left and of all the galleries.

On 16–18 May when the elections began, Robespierre proposed and carried the motion that no deputy who sat in the Constituent assembly could sit in the succeeding Legislative assembly. A tactical purpose of this self-denying ordinance was to block the ambitions of the old leaders of the Jacobins, Antoine Barnave, Adrien Duport, and Alexandre de Lameth, who aspired to create a constitutional monarchy roughly similar to that of England. (Note: They shared the general view that the "new" France would not survive repeated physical intimidation from the Paris sections, unrestrained polemics from the clubs and the press and, most important of all, the democratisation of discipline in the army and navy.) On 28 May, Robespierre proposed all Frenchmen should be declared active citizens and eligible to vote. On 30 May, he delivered a speech on abolishing the death penalty, which the Assembly did not support. Hillary Mantel described his speech as "perfectly constructed, a brilliant fusion of logic and emotion, as much a work of art as a building or a piece of music could be."

On 10 June, Robespierre delivered a speech on the state of the police and proposed to dismiss officers. On 11 June 1791 he was elected or nominated as (substitute) public prosecutor in the criminal tribunal preparing indictments. On 15 June, Pétion de Villeneuve became president of the "tribunal criminel provisoire", after Duport refused to work with Robespierre.

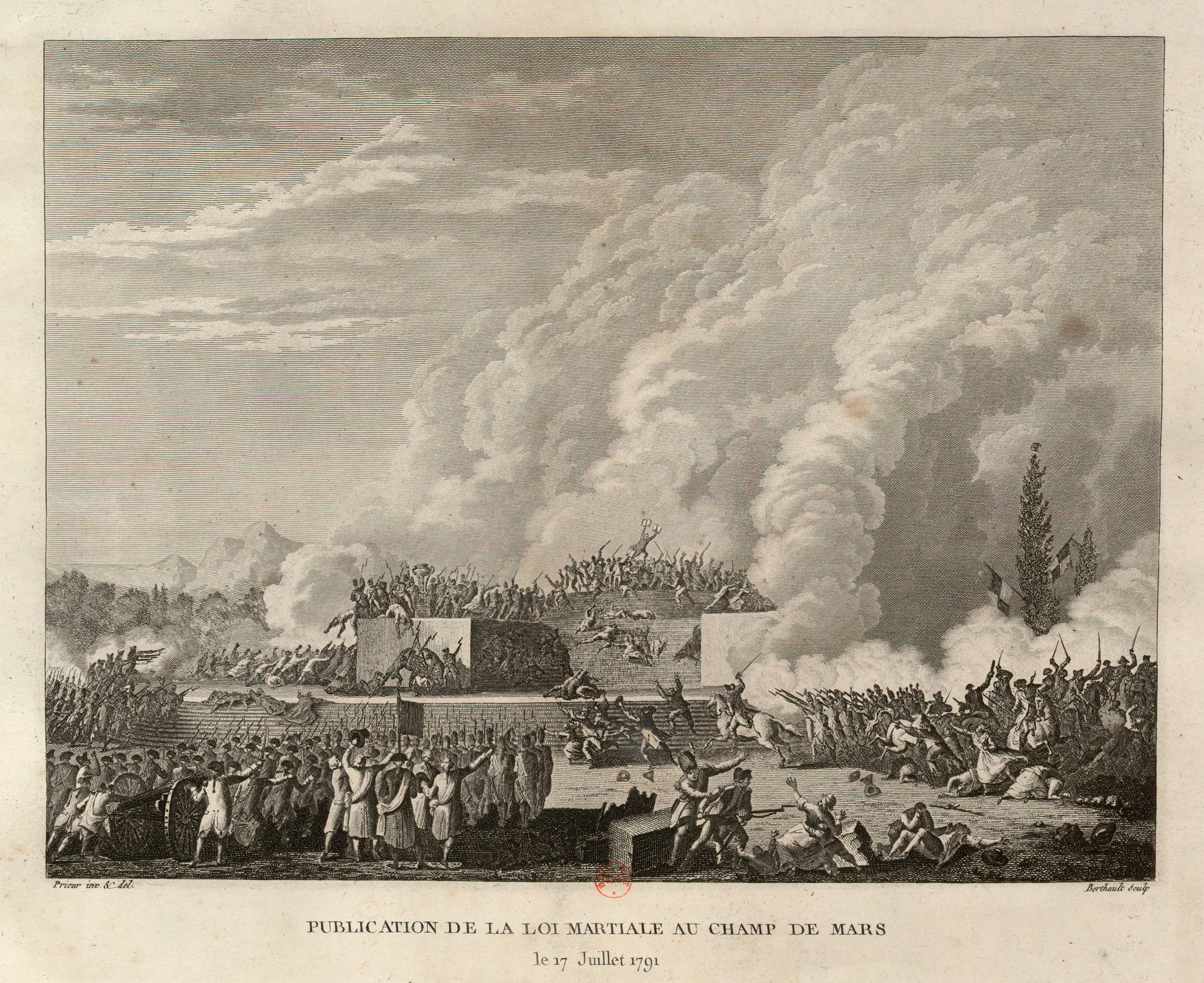
The Champ de Mars massacre (17 July 1791)

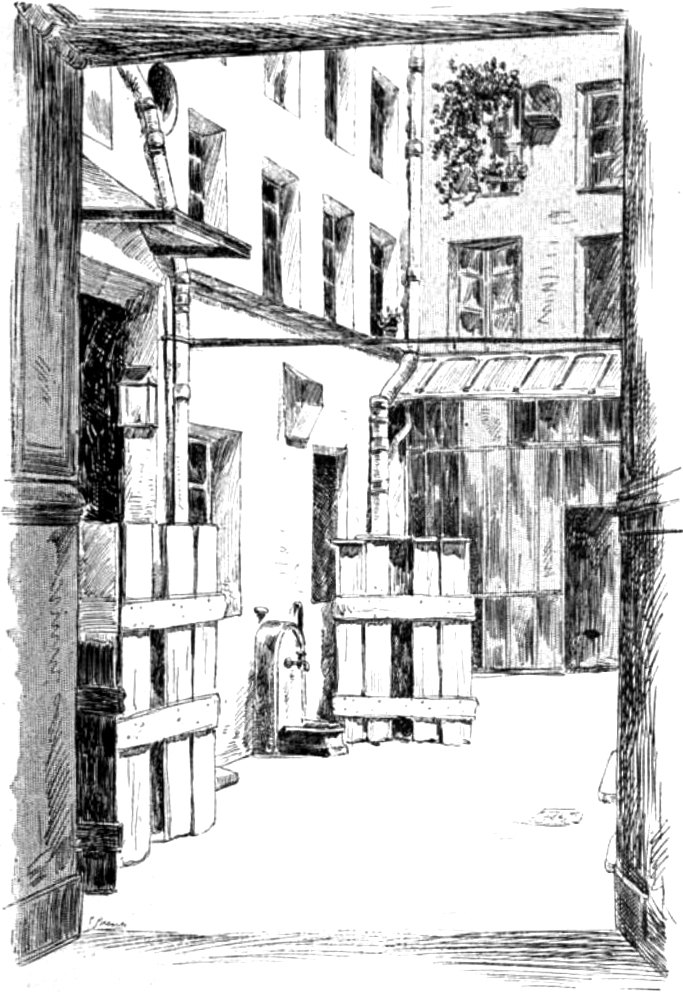
Courtyard of the house of Maurice Duplay, Robespierre's landlord. Robespierre's room was on the second floor, above the fountain. Other lodgers were his sister, brother and Joseph Le Bas.

After Louis XVI's flight to Varennes, the Assembly suspended the king from his duties on 25 June. Robespierre declared in the Jacobin Club on 13 July: "The current French constitution is a republic with a monarch. She is therefore neither a monarchy nor a republic. She is both."

After the Champ de Mars massacre, the authorities ordered numerous arrests. Robespierre, after attending the Jacobin club, did not go back to the Rue Saintonge where he lodged, and asked Laurent Lecointre if he knew a patriot near the Tuileries who could put him up for the night. Lecointre suggested Duplay's house and took him there. Maurice Duplay, a cabinetmaker and ardent admirer, lived at 398 Rue Saint-Honoré near the Tuileries. After a few days, Robespierre decided to move in permanently, motivated by a desire to live closer to the Assembly and the Jacobin club. Robespierre took up residence in the back house where he was distracted by the noises of work.

In September, the French Constitution of 1791 was accepted and the Assembly had therefore completed its task. On 30 September, the day of the dissolution of the Assembly, Robespierre opposed Jean Le Chapelier, who wanted to proclaim an end to the revolution and restrict freedom of expression. (Note: On 29 September 1791, Le Chapelier presented a decree restricting the political activity of popular societies, prohibiting them from acting collectively in political affairs or presenting petitions and deputations in their own name. Robespierre opposed the measure and defended the right of popular societies to maintain affiliations and correspondence with one another.) He succeeded in getting any requirement for inspection out of the constitution's guarantee of freedom of expression: "The freedom of every man to speak, to write, to print and publish his thoughts, without the writings having to be subject to censorship or inspection prior to their publication..." Pétion and Robespierre were brought back in triumph to their homes. (Note: On 16 November 1791 Pétion de Villeneuve was elected mayor of Paris in a contest against Lafayette.) Madame Roland labelled Pétion de Villeneuve, François Buzot, and Robespierre the "incorruptibles" in honour of their principles, their modest ways of living, and their refusal to take bribes.

On 16 October, Robespierre delivered a speech in Arras; one week later in Béthune. On 28 November, he was back in the Jacobin club, where he met with a triumphant reception. Collot d'Herbois gave his chair to Robespierre, who presided that evening. On 5 December he gave a speech on the organisation of the Garde National, which he saw as a unique institution born from the ideals of the French Revolution. On 11 December, Robespierre was finally installed as accusateur public.

== Opposition to war with Austria, 1791–1792 ==
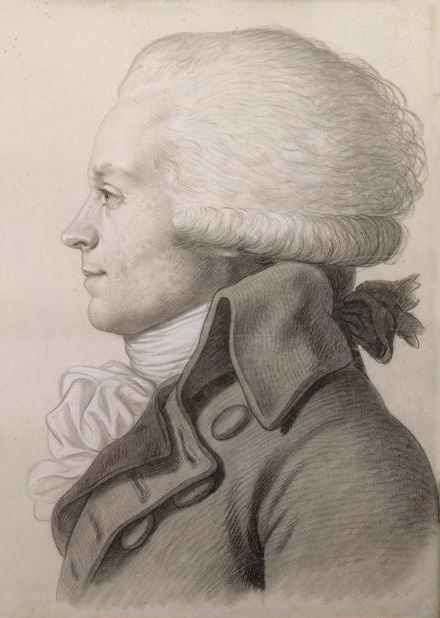
Portrait of Robespierre (1792) by Jean-Baptist Fouquet. By using a physiognotrace a "grand trait" was produced within a few minutes. This life-size drawing on pink paper was completed by Fouquet.

After Austria and Prussia issued the Declaration of Pillnitz in August 1791, Brissot pressed for war with Austria. At the Jacobin Club, Robespierre warned that war could enable ambitious generals to seize power or help the king recover his former authority. On 2 January 1792, he rejected the idea that France could spread its revolution by force: "No one loves armed missionaries."

On 10 February, in a speech on how to save the state and liberty, Robespierre supported arming citizens who lacked voting rights, with pikes if necessary. In April, he resigned as public prosecutor for the department of Paris.

When the Legislative Assembly declared war against Austria on 20 April, Robespierre told the Jacobins that the French people should arm themselves to fight abroad and guard against despotism at home. On 20 and 23 April, he spoke against Lafayette, commander of the Army of the Centre. On 17 May, he published the first issue of his weekly periodical, Le Défenseur de la Constitution, in which he set out his views on the war and published his reply to criticisms by Brissot and Guadet.

== Insurrectionary Commune of Paris, 1792 ==
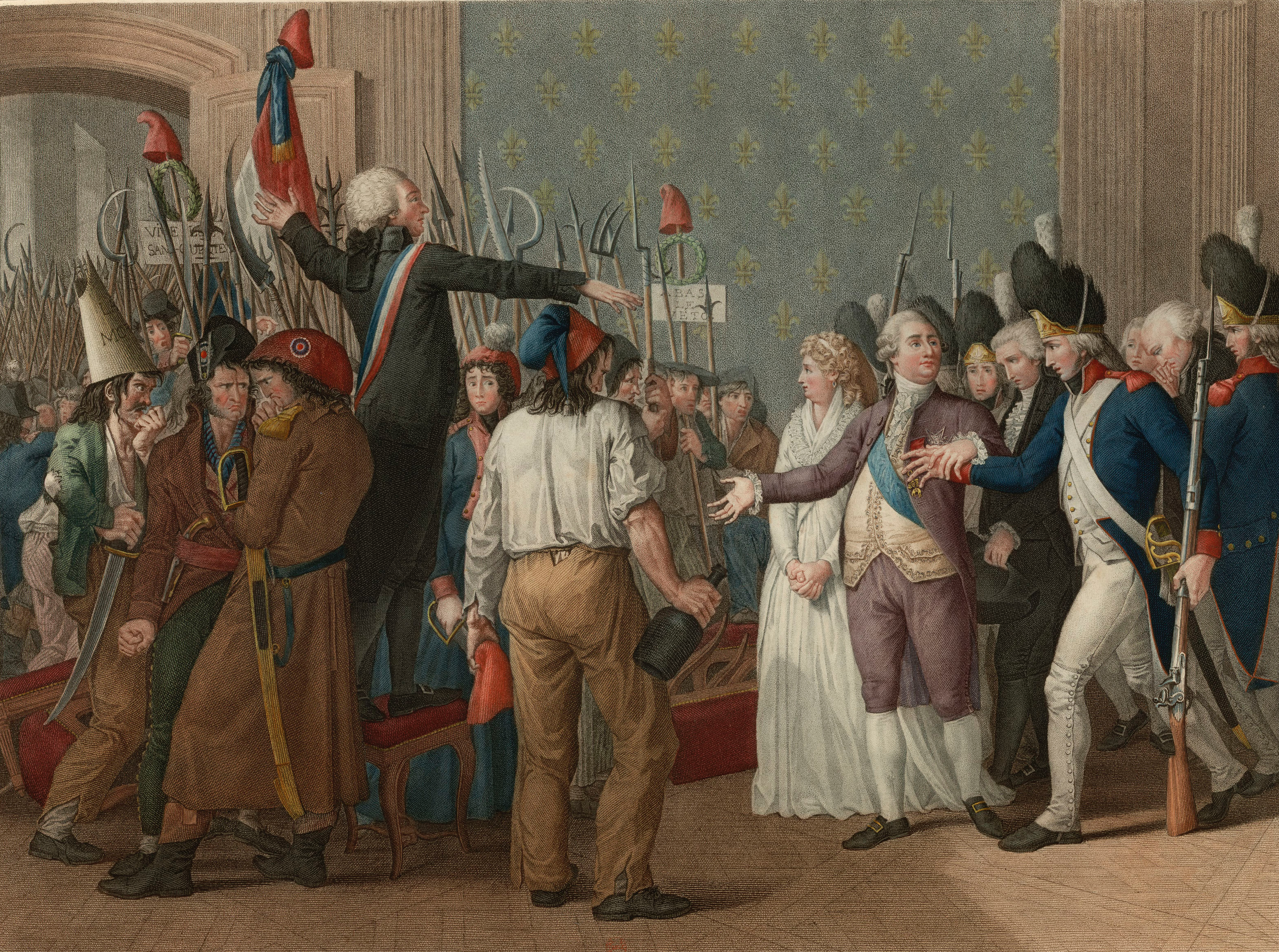
Demonstration of 20 June 1792 at the Tuileries

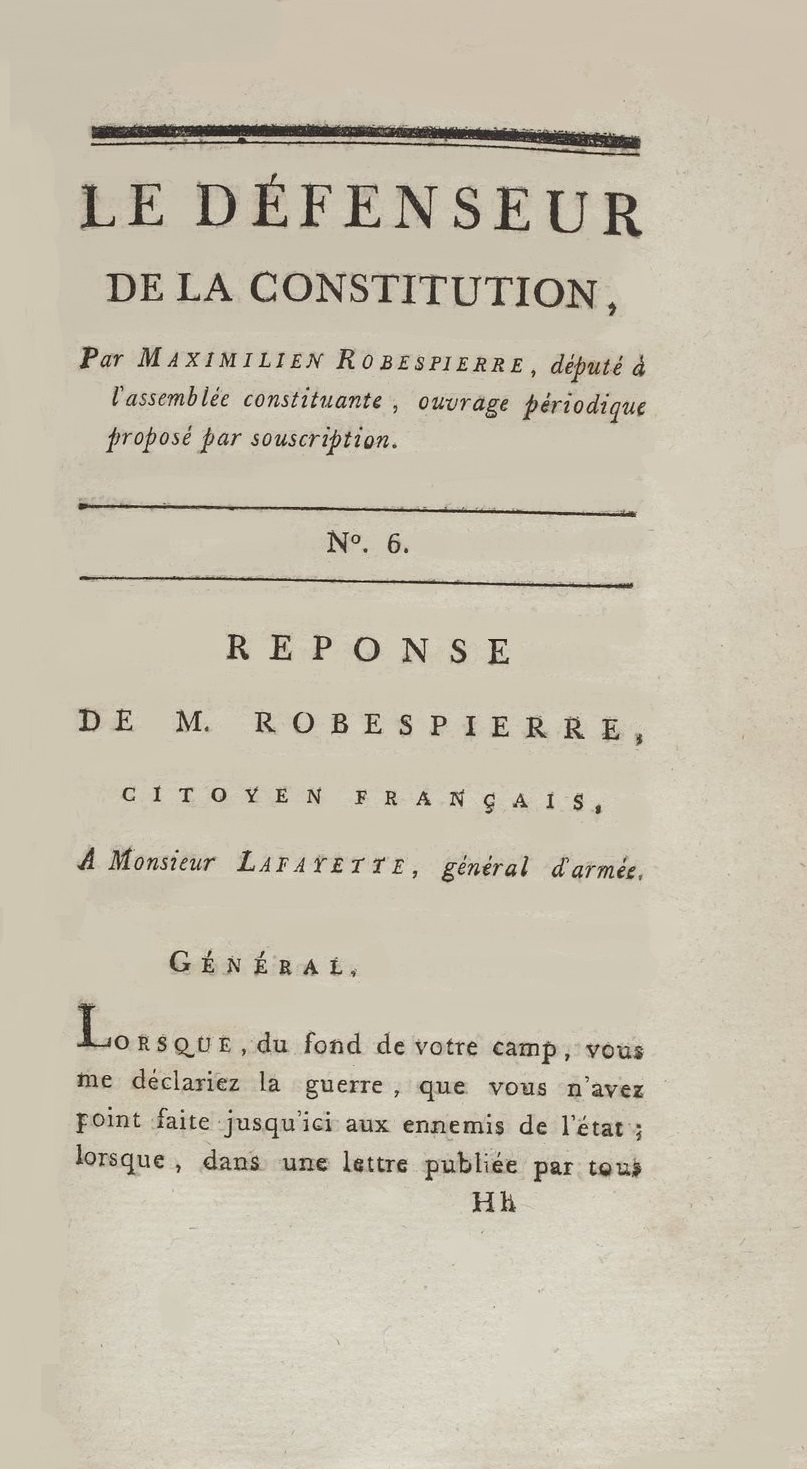
Le Défenseur de la Constitution No. 6 (1792)

=== June–July 1792 ===
In June 1792, War Minister Joseph Servan proposed forming a camp of 20,000 provincial National Guardsmen near Paris. In Le Défenseur de la Constitution, Robespierre warned that such a force could intimidate the legislature or serve the interests of a faction. Louis XVI vetoed the decree establishing the camp. On 20 June, demonstrators entered the Tuileries Palace and pressed the king to give up his veto and recall the dismissed ministers. He refused. That month, Robespierre also used his journal to answer Lafayette's denunciation of the Jacobins, accusing the general of acting as if he were the dictator of France.

On 11 July, the Legislative Assembly declared that the country was in danger. On 16 July, Robespierre urged the fédérés, volunteers from the departments who had arrived in Paris, to stay in the capital. On 29 July, he called at the Jacobin Club for the deposition of the king and the election of a National Convention.

=== August 1792 ===
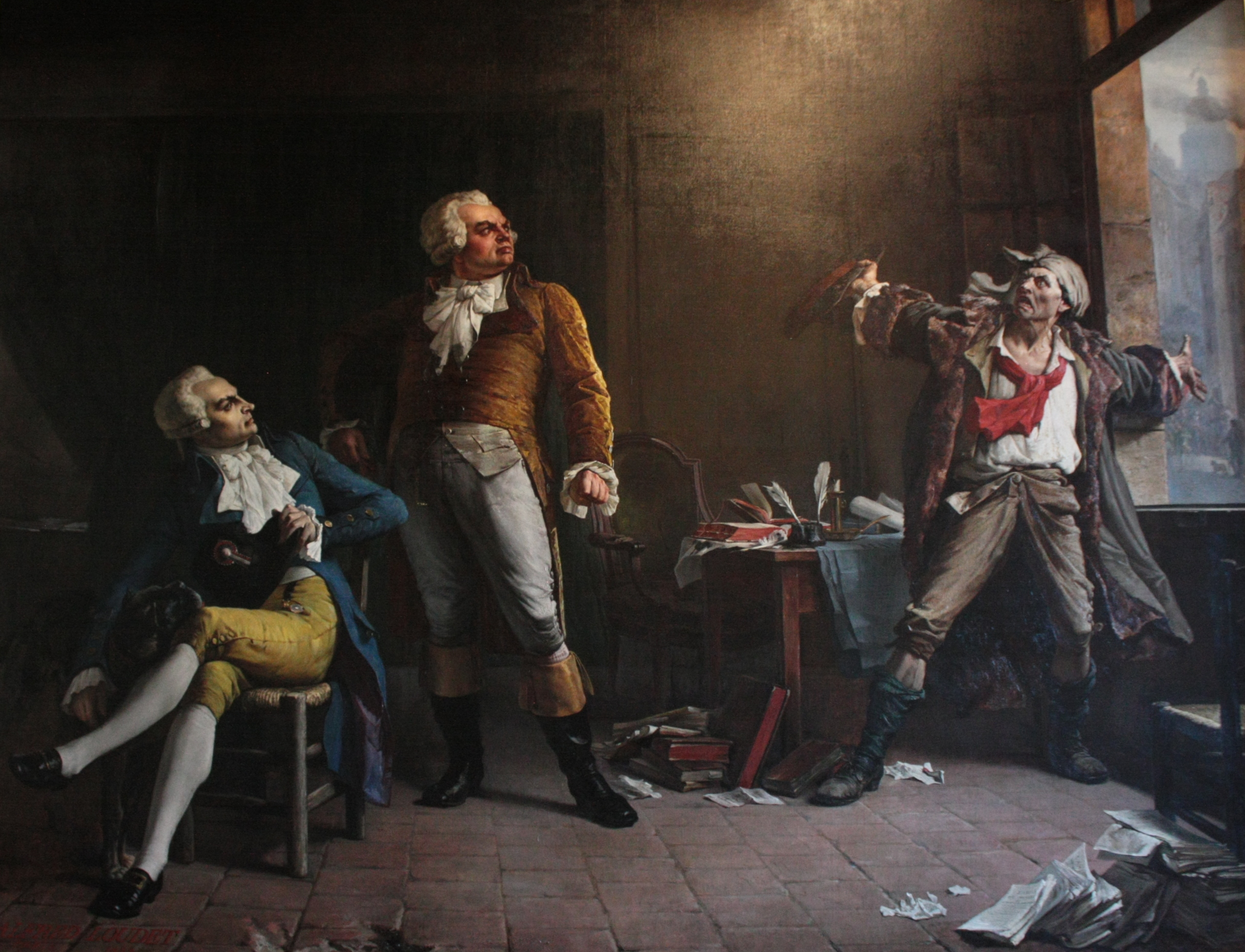
Imaginary meeting between Robespierre, Danton and Marat (illustrating Victor Hugo's novel Ninety-Three) by Alfred Loudet

On 1 August, the Assembly voted on Carnot's proposal, enforcing the distribution of pikes to all citizens, excluding vagabonds. By 3 August, the mayor and 47 sections demanded the removal of the king. On 5 August Robespierre disclosed the discovery of a plan for the king to escape to Château de Gaillon. Aligning with Robespierre's stance, almost all sections in Paris rallied for the dethronement of the king and issued a decisive ultimatum. Brissot urged the preservation of the constitution, advocating against both the dethronement of the king and the election of a new assembly. Simultaneously, the Council of Ministers recommended the arrest of Danton, Marat and Robespierre if they attended the Jacobin club.

In the early hours of Friday, 10 August 30,000 Fédérés (volunteers hailing from the countryside) and sans-culottes (militant citizens from Paris) mounted a successful assault upon the royal palace of the Tuileries. Robespierre considered it a triumph for the "passive" (non-voting) citizens. The Assembly, rattled by the events, suspended the king's powers and authorised the election of a new National Convention in the light of the changing role of the monarchy. On the night of 11 August, Robespierre secured a position in the Paris Commune, representing the Section de Piques, his residential district. The governing committee advocated universal male suffrage in the election of the new National Convention. Despite Camille Desmoulins' belief that the turmoil had concluded, Robespierre asserted that it marked merely the beginning. By 13 August, Robespierre openly opposed the reinforcement of the départements. Subsequently, Danton invited him to join the Council of Justice. Robespierre published the twelfth and final edition of Le Défenseur de la Constitution, serving as an account and political testament.

On 16 August, Robespierre submitted a petition to the Legislative Assembly, endorsed by the Paris Commune, urging the establishment of a provisional Revolutionary Tribunal specifically tasked with dealing with perceived "traitors" and "enemies of the people". The following day, he was appointed as one of eight judges for this tribunal. However, citing a lack of impartiality, Robespierre declined to preside over it. (Note: On 27 August Robespierre was elected as president of his section and explained in a letter to Le Moniteur Universel two motives: "I could not be the judge of those of which I was the adversary; but I had to remember that if they were the enemies of the fatherland, they had also declared themselves mine. This maxim, good in all circumstances, is especially applicable to this one: the justice of the people must bear a character worthy of it; it must be imposing as well as prompt and terrible. The exercise of these new functions was incompatible with that of representative of the Commune which had been entrusted to me; it was necessary to choose; I remained at the post where I was, convinced that it was there that I should currently serve the fatherland.") This decision drew criticism.

The Prussian army crossed the French frontier on 19 August. To fortify defences, the Paris armed sections were integrated into 48 battalions of the National Guard under Santerre's command. The Assembly decreed that all the nonjuring priests must leave Paris within a week and leave the country within two weeks. On 28 August, the assembly ordered a curfew for the next two days. The city gates were closed and all communication with the country was stopped. At the behest of Justice Minister Danton, thirty commissioners from the sections were ordered to search every suspect house for weapons, munitions, swords, carriages, and horses. "As a result of this inquisition, more than 1,000 "suspects" were added to the immense body of political prisoners already confined in the jails and convents of the city". Marat and Robespierre both disliked Condorcet who proposed that the "enemies of the people" belonged to the whole nation and should be judged constitutionally in its name. On 30 August the interim minister of Interior Roland and Guadet tried to suppress the influence of the Commune because the searches of suspect houses had been completed. The Assembly, tired of the pressure, declared the Commune illegal and suggested the organization of communal elections.

Robespierre was no longer willing to cooperate with Brissot and Roland. On Sunday morning, 2 September, the members of the Commune, gathering in the town hall to proceed the election of deputies to the National Convention, decided to maintain their seats and have Roland and Brissot arrested.

== National Convention ==
=== Elections ===
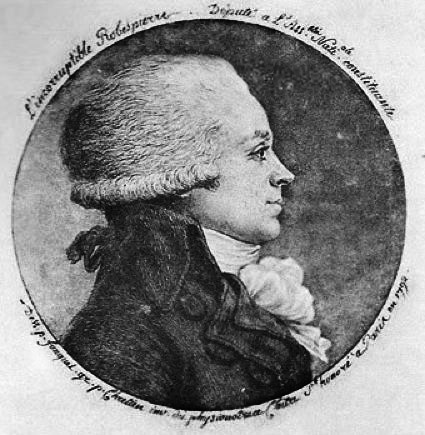
Maximilien Robespierre, physiognotrace by Chrétien, the inventor. By adjusting the needles of a pantograph he achieved a reduction ratio. This device was connected to an engraving needle. Thus it enabled the production of multiple portrait copies.

The election to the National Convention took place in two stages. In late August 1792, voters meeting in primary assemblies chose electors, who in turn elected the deputies. On 27 August, the Place-Vendôme section, chaired by Robespierre, called for the primary assemblies to have the power to review the electoral assemblies' choices and reject deputies they considered unworthy of their trust.

The Paris electoral assembly opened on 2 September, the day the September Massacres began. The Paris Commune published lists of suspected royalist electors to be excluded, and the electors voted aloud in public. On 4 September, the assembly met at the Jacobin Club and elected Collot d'Herbois as president and Robespierre as vice-president. On 5 September, Robespierre was the first of the 24 Paris deputies elected to the Convention, receiving 338 votes out of 525 cast for the first seat.

=== The Mountain ===
On 21 September, the Convention gathered for the first time. The Jacobins and Cordeliers took the high benches at the back of the former Salle du Manège, giving them the label the Montagnards ("the Mountain"); below them were the "Manège" of the Girondists, the moderate Republicans. The majority, known as the Plain, was formed by independents like Barère, Cambon and Carnot. The deputies decided to abolish the monarchy and founded the French First Republic. On 25 and 26 September, Barbaroux and the Girondist Lasource accused Robespierre of wanting to form a dictatorship.

On 30 September, Robespierre advocated several laws; the registration of marriages, births, and burials was taken away from the church. On 29 October, Louvet de Couvrai attacked Robespierre. He accused him of governing the Paris "Conseil Général" and of having done nothing to stop the September massacre; instead, according to him, he had used it to have more Montagnards elected; allegedly paying the septembriseurs to gain more votes. Robespierre, who was sick, was given a week to respond. On 5 November, Robespierre defended himself, the Jacobin Club, and his supporters:

Upon the Jacobins, I exercise, if we are to believe my accusers, a despotism of opinion, which can be regarded as nothing other than the forerunner of dictatorship. Firstly, I do not know what a dictatorship of opinion is, above all in a society of free men... unless this describes nothing more than the natural compulsion of principles. This compulsion hardly belongs to the man who enunciates them; it belongs to universal reason and to all men who wish to listen to its voice. It belongs to my colleagues of the Constituent Assembly, to the patriots of the Legislative Assembly, to all citizens who will invariably defend the cause of liberty. Experience has proven, despite Louis XVI and his allies, that the opinion of the Jacobins and the popular clubs were those of the French Nation; no citizen has made them, and I did nothing other than share in them.

Turning the accusations upon his accusers, Robespierre delivered one of the most famous lines of the French Revolution to the Assembly:

I will not remind you that the sole object of contention dividing us is that you have instinctively defended all acts of new ministers, and we, of principles; that you seemed to prefer power, and we equality... Why don't you prosecute the Commune, the Legislative Assembly, the Sections of Paris, the Assemblies of the Cantons and all who imitated us? For all these things have been illegal, as illegal as the Revolution, as the fall of the Monarchy and of the Bastille, as illegal as liberty itself... Citizens, do you want a revolution without a revolution? What is this spirit of persecution which has directed itself against those who freed us from chains?

After publishing his speech "A Maximilien Robespierre et à ses royalistes (accusation)", Louvet was no longer admitted to the Jacobin Club. Condorcet considered the French Revolution as a religion and believed that Robespierre had all the characteristics of a leader of a sect, or a cult. (Note: On 5 February 1791 Robespierre declared: "True religion consists in punishing for the happiness of all those who disturb society.") As his opponents knew well, Robespierre had a strong base of support among the women of Paris called tricoteuses (knitters). According to Moore, "He [Robespierre] refuses offices in which he might be of service, takes those where he can govern; appears when he can make a figure, disappears when others occupy the stage".

=== Execution of Louis XVI ===
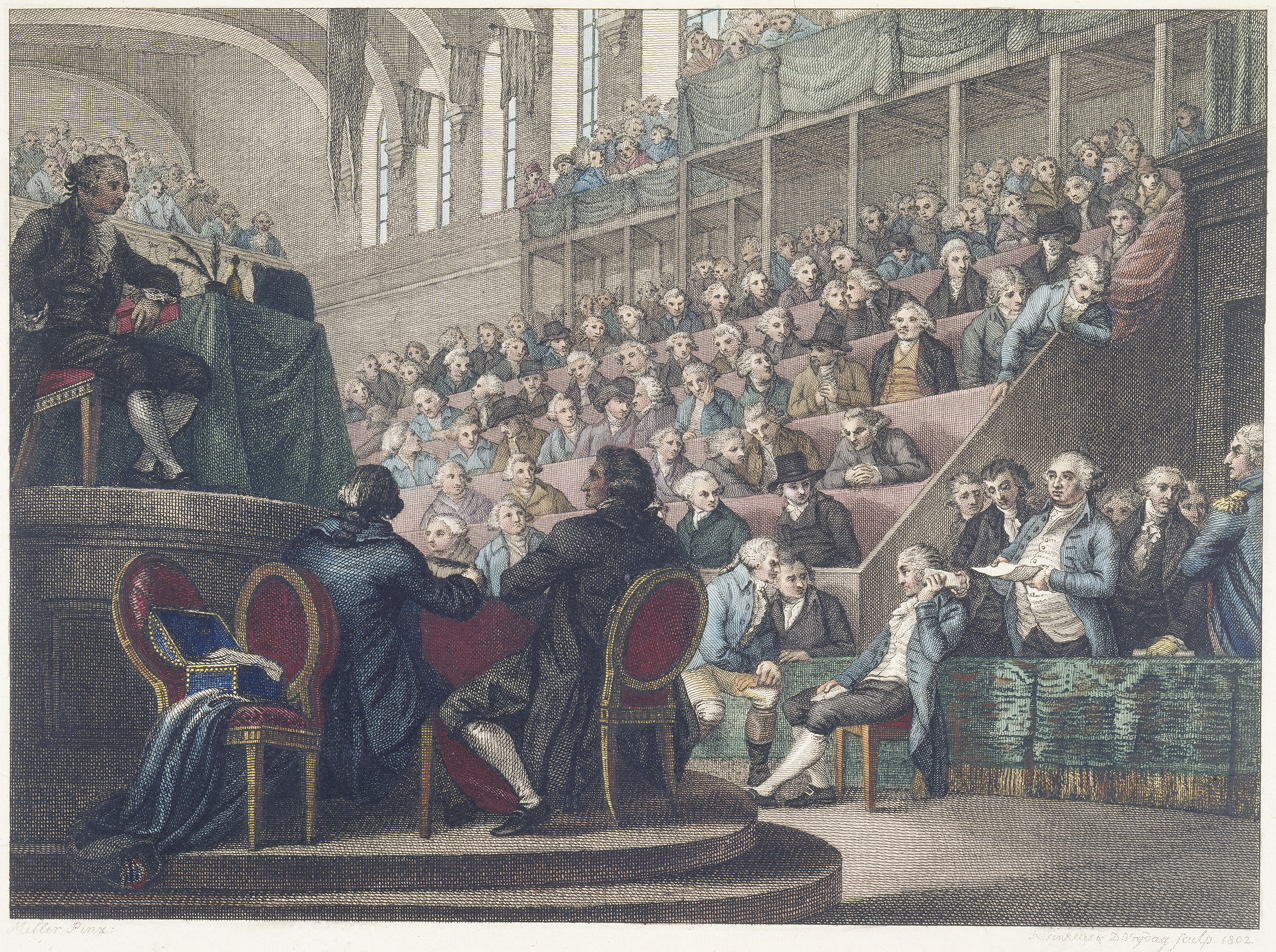
Louis XVI stands trial before the Convention, as Robespierre watches from the first row. Engraving by Reinier Vinkeles

Execution of Louis XVI

After the Convention's unanimous declaration of a French Republic on 21 September 1792, opinion turned sharply against Louis XVI following the discovery of a secret cache of 726 documents consisting of his communications with bankers and ministers. The National Convention decreed that the king should be put on trial. On 28 December, Robespierre was asked to repeat his speech on the fate of the king in the Jacobin club. On 14 January 1793, the king was unanimously voted guilty of conspiracy and attacks upon public safety. On 16 January, voting began to determine the king's sentence; Robespierre worked fervently to ensure the king's execution. The Jacobins successfully defeated the Girondins' final appeal for clemency. On 20 January, half of the deputies voted for immediate death. The next day Louis XVI was guillotined. The influence of Robespierre, Danton, and the Montagnards had reached its peak.

=== February–April 1793 ===
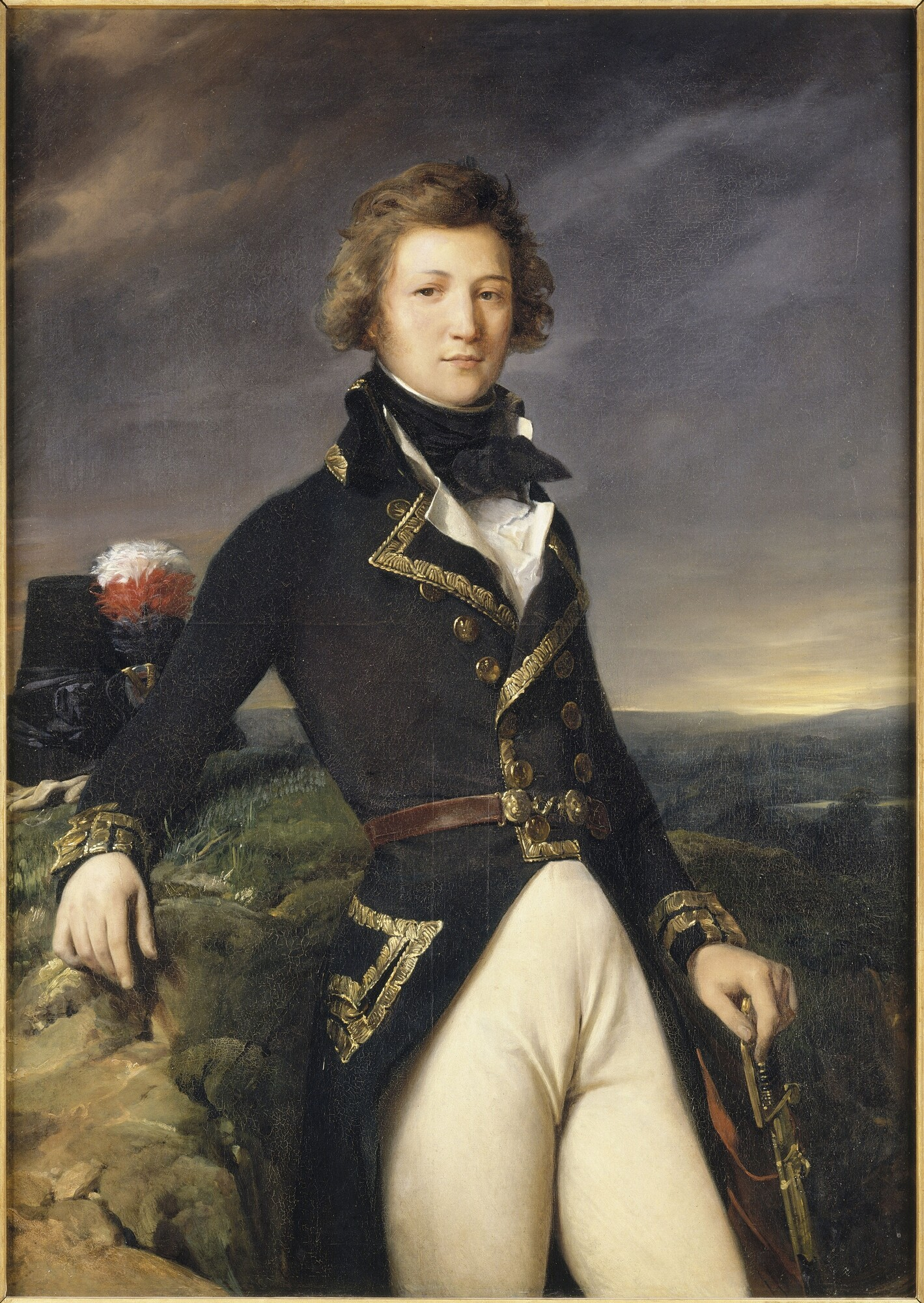
Louis Philippe in 1792, by Léon Cogniet (1834)

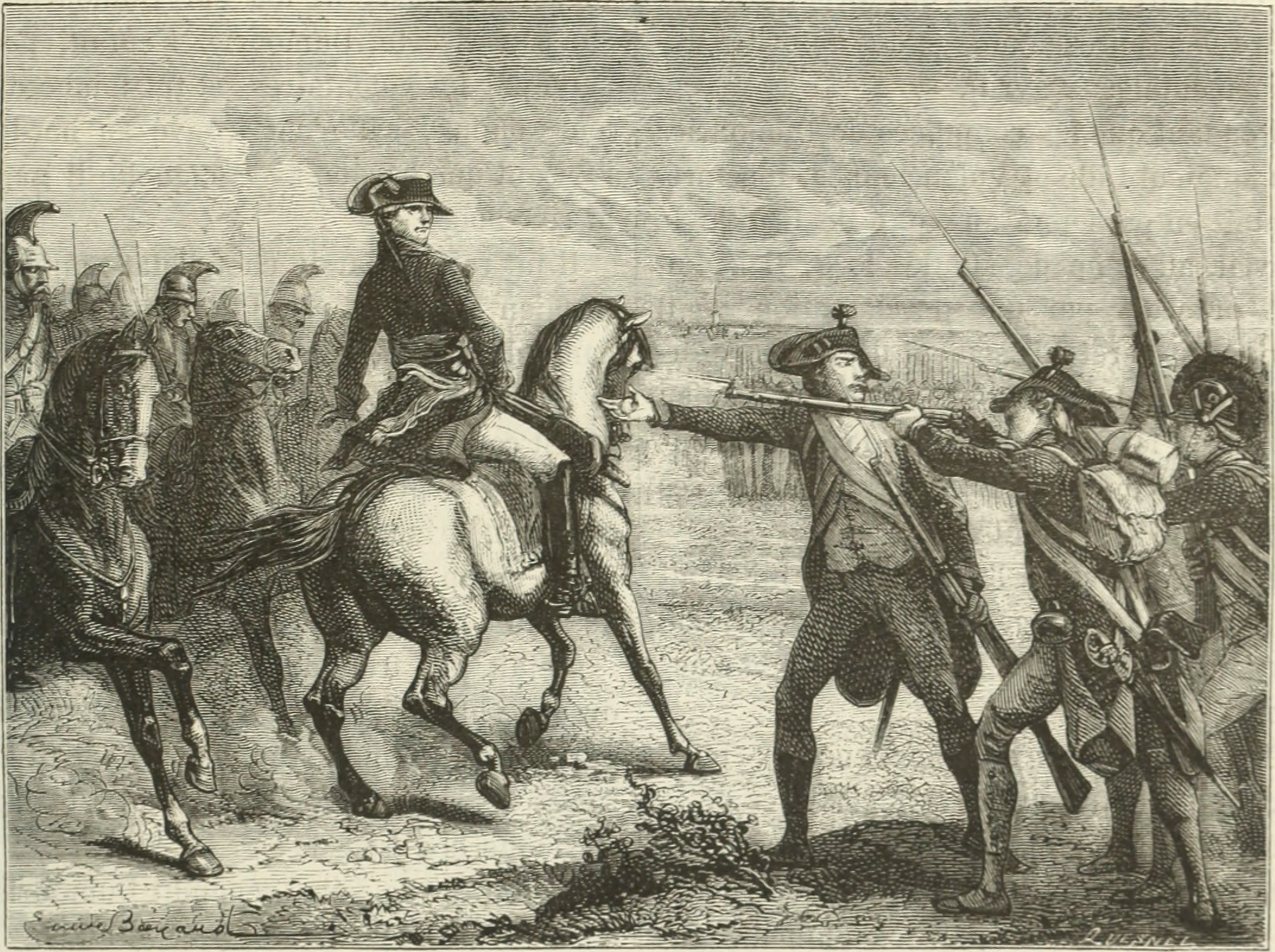
The defection of Dumouriez.

On 1 February, the Convention declared war on Great Britain and the United Provinces. On 24 February, it decreed a levy of 300,000 men to reinforce the French armies. The measure proved deeply unpopular and contributed to unrest in rural France, particularly in the west, where the War in the Vendée soon broke out. In Paris, meanwhile, rising prices and food shortages intensified popular hostility towards the Girondins, who were accused by the Enragés and other radicals of opposing measures against hoarding and high prices.

The military situation also deteriorated. French forces were driven back in the Austrian Netherlands, while on 7 March France declared war on Spain. On 9–10 March, amid news of military defeats, crowds in Paris demanded action against deputies regarded as traitors and destroyed the printing presses of several Girondin newspapers. On 10 March, the Convention established the Revolutionary Tribunal to try counter-revolutionary offences. Fouquier-Tinville was subsequently appointed accusateur public. Robespierre was initially wary of the new tribunal, fearing that it might become the political instrument of a faction.

Meanwhile, French rule in the Austrian Netherlands encountered growing resistance. Following the French military defeats in early March, indiscipline and looting spread among the retreating troops, while some French commissioners resorted to arbitrary arrests and the confiscation of church property. Anti-French unrest subsequently developed into open insurrection in several parts of Belgium.

On 11 March, Charles François Dumouriez addressed the Brussels assembly, acknowledged abuses committed by French commissioners and soldiers, and promised to restore order and release Belgians who had been arbitrarily arrested. The following day, he informed the Convention that he had suspended several commissioners and blamed French policy in Belgium for alienating the population. His actions, taken without prior authorization, contributed to growing suspicion of him in Paris.

On 25 March, Robespierre became one of the 25 members of the reorganized Committee of General Defence, which coordinated the war effort. His attitude towards Dumouriez had by then changed markedly. On 26 March, Robespierre argued in the committee that Dumouriez had assumed dictatorial powers in Belgium and called for his removal from command, although Danton and Camus opposed the proposal. Three days later, after the committee had considered further accusations against Dumouriez and a defiant letter from the general, it recommended his arrest. On 30 March, the Convention ordered Dumouriez and his staff to be brought to Paris.

When the minister of war, Beurnonville, and four deputies arrived at Dumouriez's headquarters on 1 April to arrest him, Dumouriez instead had them arrested and handed over to the Austrians. He then attempted to rally his army behind a march on Paris to overthrow the Convention and restore the Constitution of 1791, but most commanders and troops remained loyal to the Republic. Dumouriez's defection intensified the political struggle between the Montagnards and Girondins, as the former increasingly associated the Girondin leadership with the disgraced general. On 3 April, Robespierre accused Brissot and his allies of having conspired with Dumouriez to overthrow the Republic.

On 6 April, the Committee of Public Safety replaced the Committee of General Defence. Its nine members included neither Robespierre nor the leading Girondins. The political repercussions of Dumouriez's defection meanwhile intensified the struggle between the Montagnards and Girondins. Robespierre increasingly presented the general's treason as evidence against Brissot and his political allies. On 10 April, in a lengthy speech against Brissot and the Girondins, he accused them of sharing responsibility for the policies pursued by Dumouriez, including the decision to prevent the circulation of assignats in Belgium.

Excluded from the Committee of Public Safety, Robespierre became increasingly pessimistic about achieving political change through the Convention alone. At the Jacobin Club he called for the mobilisation of the Paris sections and proposed raising an army of sans-culottes to defend the capital against internal and external enemies.

During April, Robespierre's speeches became increasingly concerned with the threat of counter-revolution and treason. He supported exceptional measures against those suspected of assisting France's enemies and called for the mobilisation of sans-culottes against internal rebellion. He also proposed the death penalty for anyone advocating negotiations with the enemy.

Meanwhile, the Convention was debating a new Declaration of the Rights of Man and of the Citizen. On 24 April, Robespierre presented his own draft declaration. He challenged an unrestricted conception of property rights and proposed that property should be limited by the rights of others and by obligations to society. He also advocated progressive taxation and emphasized fraternity among peoples.

=== May 1793 ===
On 1 May, according to the Girondin deputé Jacques-Antoine Dulaure, 8,000 armed men surrounded the Convention and threatened not to leave if the emergency measures they demanded (a decent salary and maximum on food prices) were not adopted. On 4 May, the Convention agreed to support the families of soldiers and sailors who left their home to fight the enemy. Robespierre pressed ahead with his strategy of class war. On 8 and 12 May in the Jacobin Club, Robespierre restated the necessity of founding a revolutionary army that would search for grain, to be funded by a tax on the rich, and would be intended to defeat aristocrats and counter-revolutionaries. He said that public squares should be used to produce arms and pikes. In mid-May, Marat and the Commune supported him publicly and secretly. The Convention decided to set up a commission of inquiry of twelve members, with a very strong Girondin majority. Jacques Hébert, the editor of Le Père Duchesne, was arrested after attacking or calling for the death of the twenty-two Girondins. The next day, the Commune demanded that Hébert be released.

On 26 May, after a week of silence, Robespierre delivered one of the most decisive speeches of his career. He called on the Jacobin Club "to place themselves in insurrection against corrupt deputies". Isnard declared that the Convention would not be influenced by any violence and that Paris had to respect the representatives from elsewhere in France. The Convention decided Robespierre would not be heard. The atmosphere became extremely agitated. Some deputies were willing to kill if Isnard dared to declare civil war in Paris; the president was asked to give up his seat.

On 28 May, a weak Robespierre excused himself twice due to his physical condition, but still attacked Brissot for his royalism. Robespierre left the Convention after applause from the left side and went to the town hall. There he called for an armed insurrection against the majority of the Convention. "If the Commune does not unite closely with the people, it violates its most sacred duty", he said. In the afternoon, the Commune demanded the creation of a revolutionary army of sans-culottes in every town of France, including 20,000 men to defend Paris.

On 29 May, Robespierre was occupied in preparing the public mind. He attacked Charles Jean Marie Barbaroux, but admitted he almost gave up his political career because of his anxieties. The delegates representing thirty-three of the Paris sections formed an insurrectionary committee. They declared themselves in a state of insurrection, dissolved the general council of the commune, and immediately reconstituted it, making it take a new oath; François Hanriot was elected as Commandant-Général of the Parisian National Guard. Louis Antoine de Saint-Just was added to the Committee of Public Safety; Couthon became secretary.

The next day, the tocsin in the Notre-Dame was rung and the city gates were closed; the Insurrection of 31 May – 2 June began. Hanriot was ordered to fire a cannon on the Pont-Neuf as a sign of alarm. Around ten in the morning, 12,000 armed citizens appeared to protect the Convention against the arrest of Girondin deputies.

On 1 June, the Commune gathered over the course of the day and devoted it to the preparation of a great movement. The Comité insurrectionnel ordered Hanriot to surround the Convention "with a respectable armed force". In the evening, 40,000 men surrounded the building to force the arrest. Marat led the attack on the representatives, who had voted against the execution of the King and since then paralysed the Convention. The Commune decided to petition the Convention. The Convention decided to allow men to carry arms on days of crisis and pay them for each day and promised to indemnify the workers for the interruption in the past four days.

Unsatisfied with the result, the Commune demanded and prepared a Supplement to the revolution. Hanriot offered (or was ordered) to march the National Guard from the town hall to the National Palace. The next morning a large force of armed citizens (some estimated 80,000 or 100,000, but Danton spoke of only 30,000) surrounded the Convention with artillery. "The armed force", Hanriot said, "will retire only when the Convention has delivered to the people the deputies denounced by the Commune." The Girondins believed they were protected by the law, but the people in the galleries called for their arrest. Twenty-two Girondins were seized.

The Montagnards now had control of the Convention. The Girondins, going to the provinces, joined the counter-revolution.

During the insurrection, Robespierre had scrawled a note in his memorandum-book:

What we need is a single will (il faut une volonté une). It must be either republican or royalist. If it is to be republican, we must have republican ministers, republican newspapers, republican deputies, a republican government. ... The internal dangers come from the middle classes; to defeat the middle classes we must rally the people. ... The people must ally themselves with the Convention, and the Convention must make use of the people.

On 3 June, the Convention decided to split up the land belonging to Émigrés and sell it to farmers. On 12 June, Robespierre announced his intention to resign due to health issues. On 13 July, Robespierre defended the plans of Le Peletier to teach revolutionary ideas in boarding schools. (Note: All children would be taken away from their parents and placed in a boarding school from the age of five, until the age of eleven for girls for girls, twelve for boys, and subjected to work. "The boys will be trained in addition to the handling of weapons.") On the following day, the Convention rushed to praise Marat – who had been murdered in his bathtub – for his fervor and revolutionary diligence. Opposing Pierre-Louis Bentabole, Robespierre simply called for an inquiry into the circumstances of Marat's death. On 17 or 22 July the property of the Émigres were expropriated by decree; proofs of ownership had to be collected and burnt.

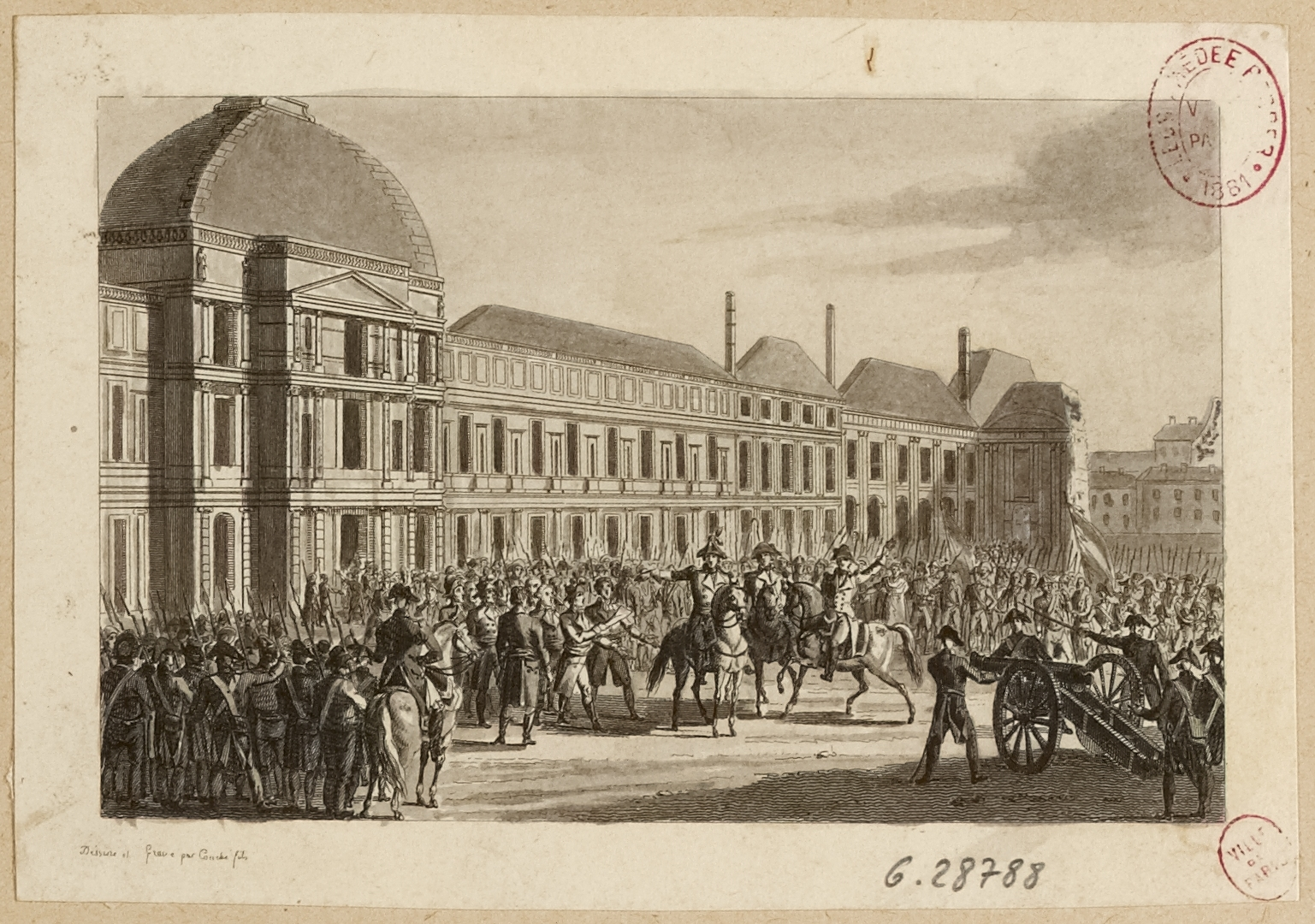
Journées des 31 Mai, 1er et 2 Juin 1793, an engraving of the Convention surrounded by National Guards.

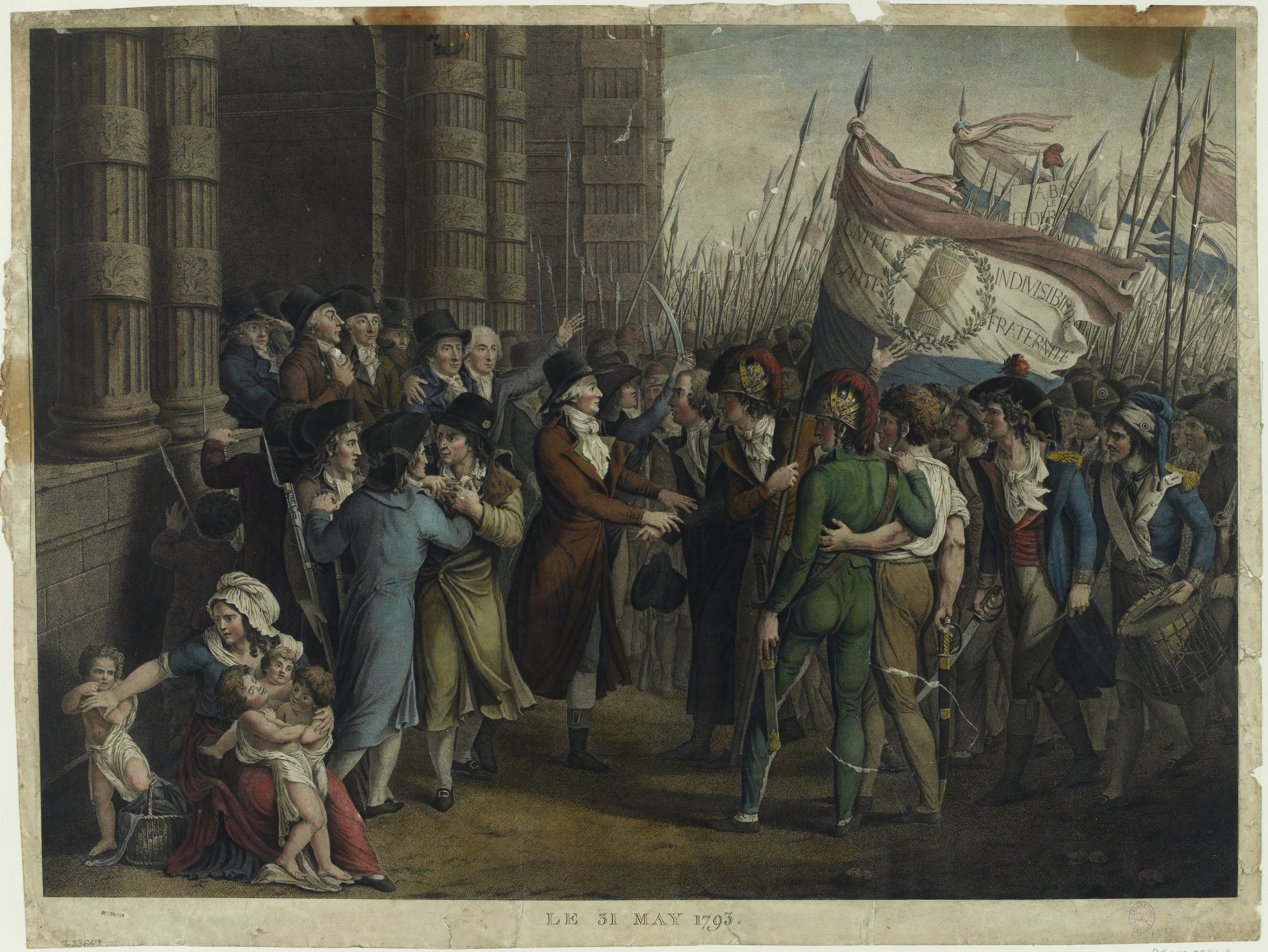
The uprising of the Parisian sans-culottes from 31 May to 2 June 1793. The scene takes place in front of the Deputies Chamber in the Tuileries. The depiction shows Marie-Jean Hérault de Séchelles and Pierre Victurnien Vergniaud.

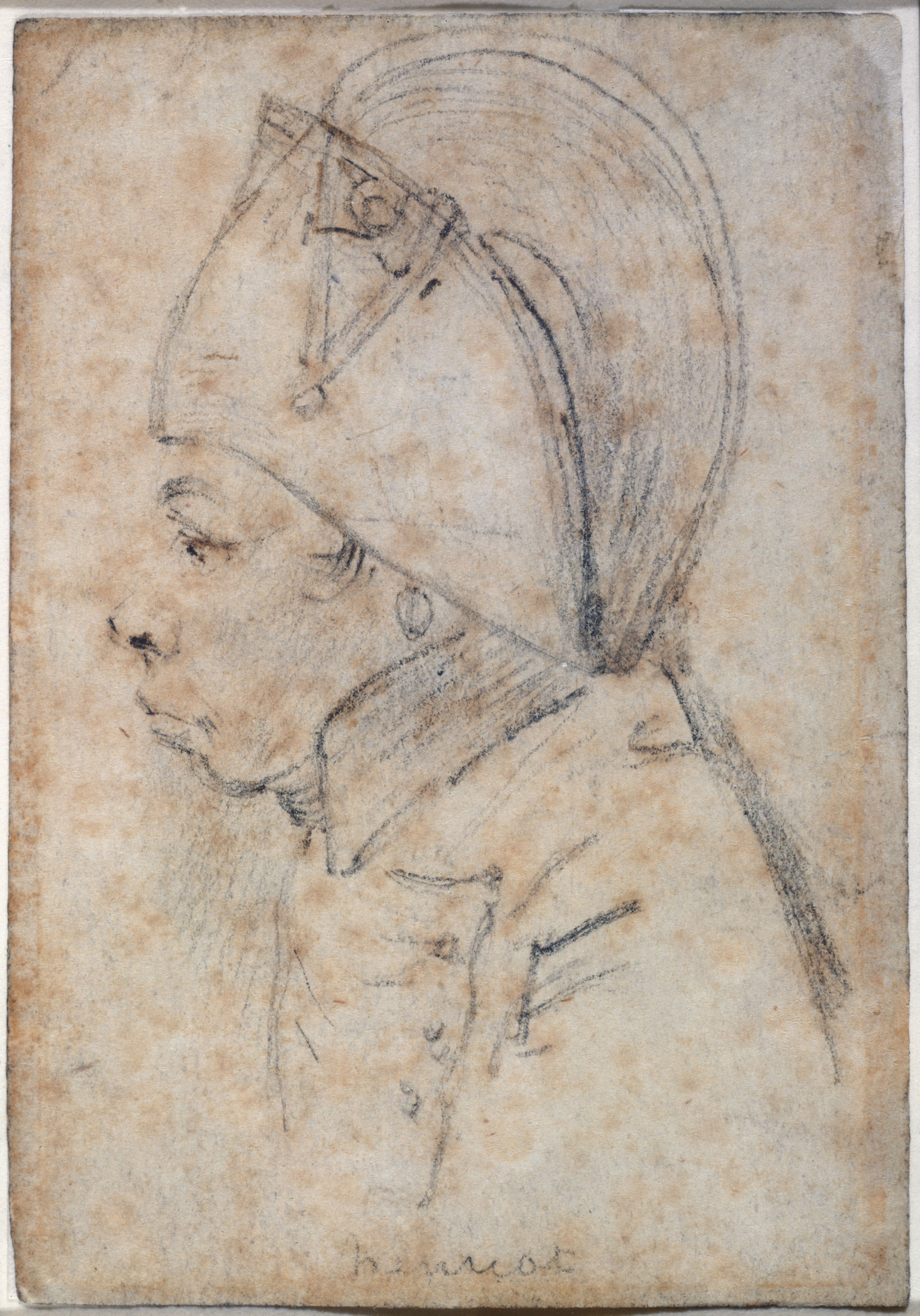
François Hanriot chef de la section des Sans-Culottes (Rue Mouffetard); drawing by Gabriel in the Carnavalet Museum

== Reign of Terror ==
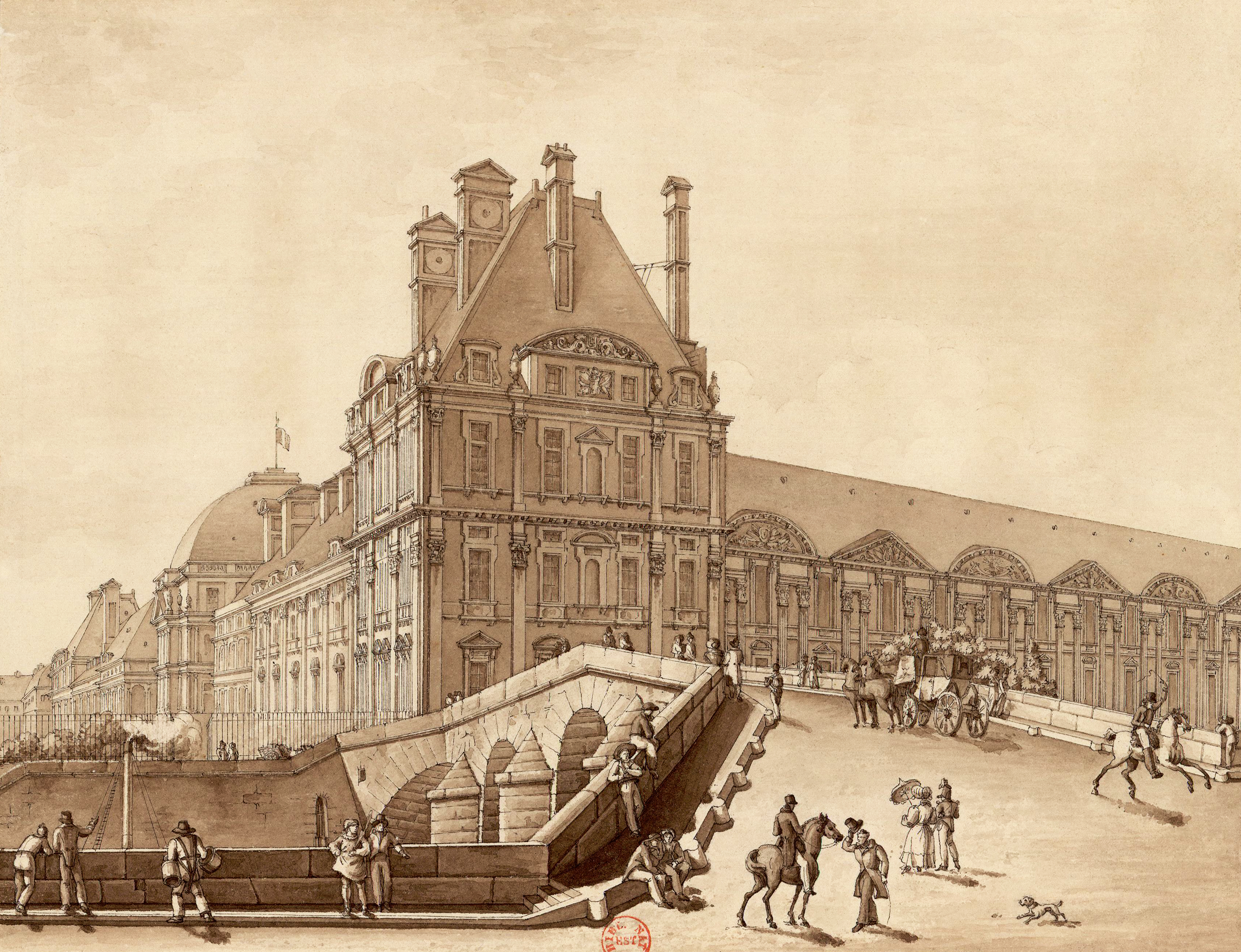
The Pavillon de Flore, the seat of the Committee of Public Safety and General Police Bureau. Joachim Vilate lived there in an apartment. Drawing in brown ink (1814)

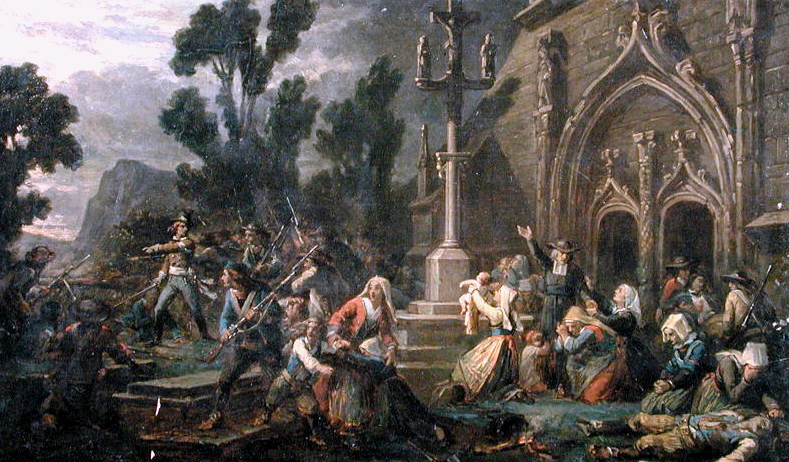
Peasants and commoners (insurgent royalists or Chouans) in the Vendée, Maine, the south of Normandy or the eastern part of Brittany defending a Catholic church. Artist unknown

The French government confronted significant internal challenges as the provincial cities rebelled against the more radical revolutionaries in Paris. Marat and Le Peletier were assassinated, instilling fear in Robespierre and other prominent figures for their own safety. Corsica formally seceded from France and sought protection from the British government. In July, France teetered on the brink of civil war, besieged by aristocratic uprisings in Vendée and Brittany, by federalist revolts in Lyon, Le Midi, and Normandy, and confronted with hostility from across Europe and foreign factions.

=== June–July 1793 ===
At the end of June, Robespierre launched an attack on Jacques Roux, portraying him as a foreign agent, which led to Roux's expulsion from the Jacobin Club. On 13 July, the day Marat was assassinated, Robespierre voiced support for Louis-Michel le Peletier's proposals to introduce revolutionary concepts into schools. He also condemned the initiatives of the Parisian radicals, known as the Enragés, who exploited rising inflation and food shortages to incite unrest among the Paris sections.

On 27 July, Robespierre finally joined the Committee, replacing Thomas-Augustin de Gasparin. This marked Robespierre's second stint in an executive position to oversee the war effort. While Robespierre was generally considered the most recognisable member of the Committee, it operated without a hierarchical structure.

=== August 1793 ===
On 10 August, the French Constitution of 1793, adopted on 24 June and approved by a popular referendum, was publicly proclaimed. (Note: Four articles by Robespierre affirm the unity of the human race, universal male suffrage, the need for solidarity between the peoples, and the rejection of kings.) Its implementation remained uncertain amid the federalist uprisings in cities including Marseille, Bordeaux and Lyon. According to historian Albert Soboul, Robespierre and the Committee of Public Safety opposed the immediate introduction of the new constitutional institutions, preferring that the Convention remain in power until peace was restored. On 11 August, Robespierre opposed proposals to replace the Convention with a newly elected legislature, a position he reaffirmed on 23 August.

On 22 August, Robespierre was elected president of the Convention, receiving 143 votes. The following day, on a report by Bertrand Barère on behalf of the Committee of Public Safety, the Convention decreed the levée en masse, placing the population and resources of France at the disposal of the war effort. Robespierre was particularly concerned with ensuring the virtue of public officials. His brother Augustin Robespierre, who had been sent by the Convention as a representative on mission to the Army of Italy together with fr:Jean François Ricord, travelled through the rebellious south accompanied by their sister Charlotte.

=== September 1793 ===
On 4 September, the sans-culottes once again stormed the Convention, demanding stricter measures against rising prices, even though the circulating assignats had doubled in the preceding months. They also called for the establishment of a system of terror to eradicate counter-revolution. During the session on 5 September, Robespierre yielded the chair to Jacques Thuriot, as he needed to attend the Committee of Public Safety to supervise the report on the constitution of the revolutionary army. During that day's session, Barère, representing the Committee of Public Safety, introduced a decree that was promptly passed, establishing a paid armed force of 6,000 men and 1,200 gunners "tasked with crushing counter-revolutionaries, enforcing revolutionary laws and public safety measures decreed by the National Convention, and safeguarding provisions."

On 11 September, the authority of the Committee of Public Safety was extended for one month. Robespierre threw his support behind Hanriot in the Jacobin Club and voiced opposition to the appointment of Lazare Carnot on 23 August to the committee, citing Carnot's non-membership in the Jacobin Club and his refusal to endorse the events of 31 May.

Thuriot resigned on 20 September due to irreconcilable differences with Robespierre, becoming one of his more vocal opponents. The Revolutionary Tribunal underwent reorganisation, being divided into four sections, with two sections always active simultaneously. On 29 September, the Committee introduced the price controls, particularly in the area supplying Paris. According to historian Augustin Cochin, shops were emptied within a week due to these measures.

=== October 1793 ===
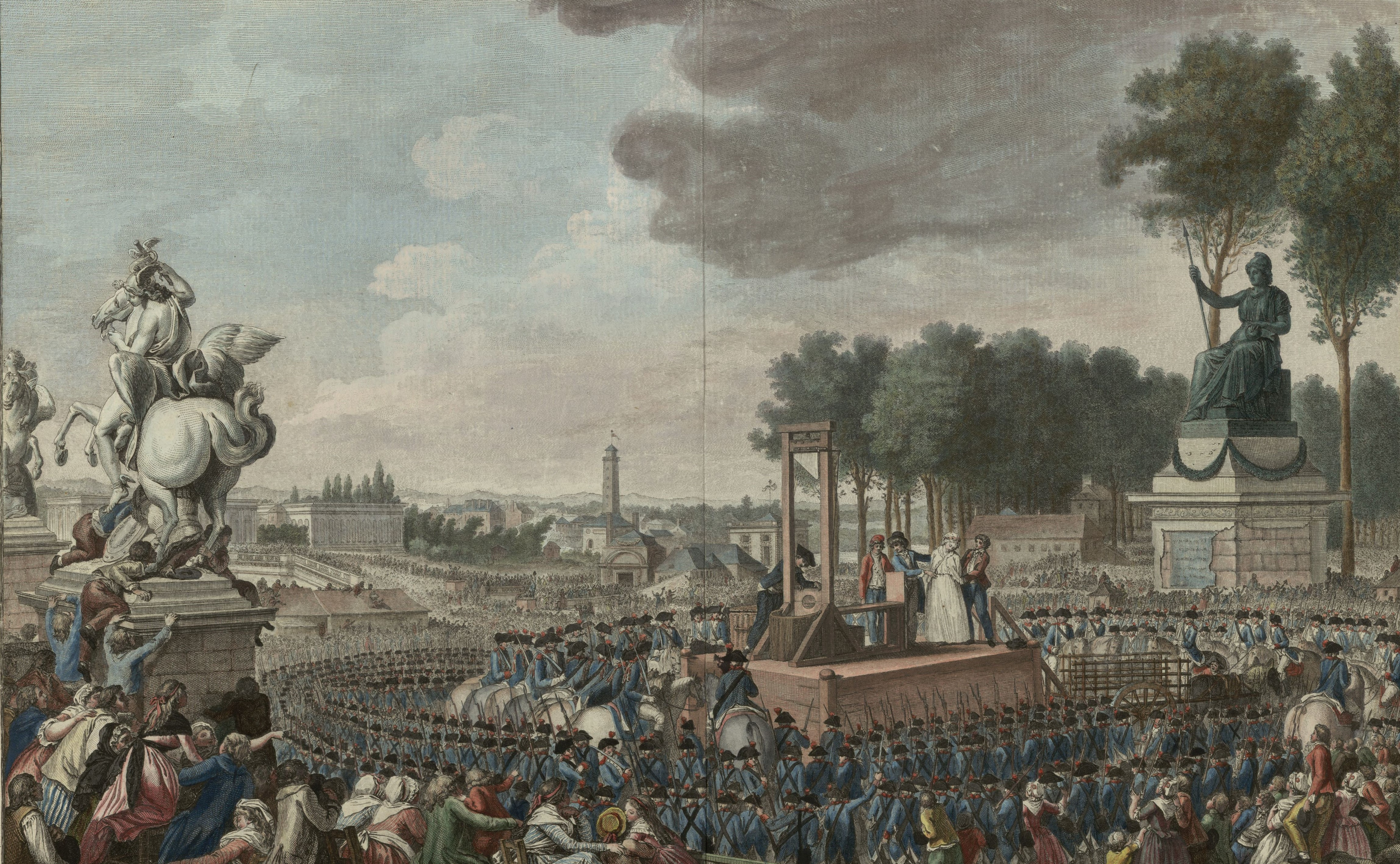
Marie Antoinette's execution by guillotine on 16 October 1793

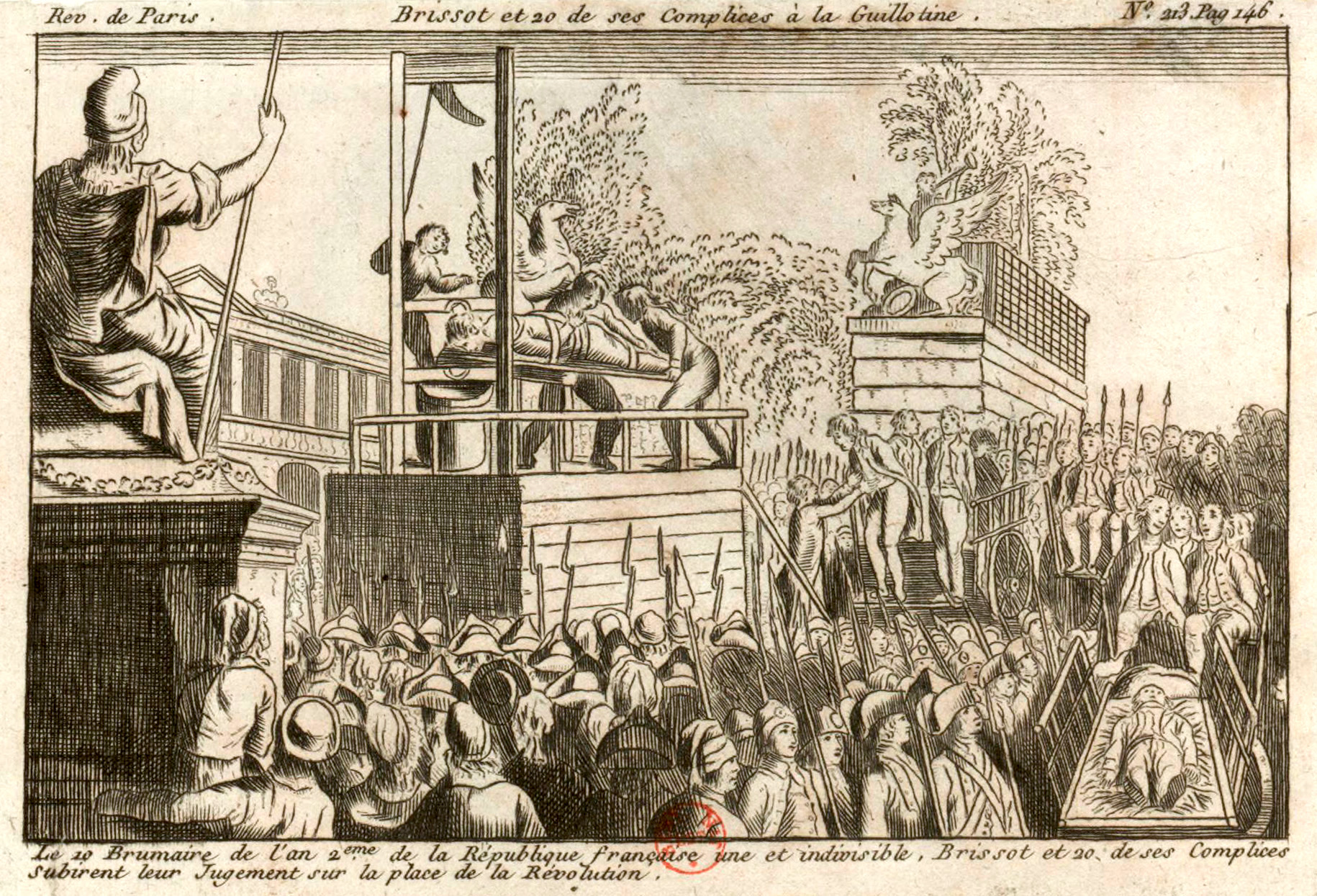
The execution of the Girondins on 31 October 1793

On 3 October, Robespierre perceived the Convention as split into two factions: those aligned with the people, and those he deemed conspirators. He defended seventy-three Girondins "as useful", but over twenty were subsequently brought to trial. He criticised Danton, who had declined a seat on the Committee of Public Safety, advocating instead for a stable government capable of resisting the Committee's directives. Danton, who had been dangerously ill for a few weeks, withdrew from politics and departed for Arcis-sur-Aube. By 8 October, the Convention resolved to arrest Brissot and the Girondins.

On 10 October, following a report by Saint-Just on behalf of the Committee of Public Safety, the Convention decreed that the provisional government of France would remain revolutionary until peace, and placed the executive council, ministers, generals and other constituted authorities under the Committee's supervision. The system was further centralised by the Law of 14 Frimaire on 4 December, which defined the Convention as the sole centre of governmental authority and placed constituted bodies and public officials under the immediate supervision of the Committee of Public Safety in matters of government and public safety.

On 12 October, amid accusations by Hébert implicating Marie-Antoinette's engaging in incest with her son the Dauphin, Robespierre shared a meal with staunch supporters including Barère, Saint-Just, and Joachim Vilate. During the discussion, Robespierre, visibly incensed, broke his plate with his fork and denounced Hébert as an "imbecile". The verdict on the former queen was delivered by the jury of the Revolutionary Tribunal on 16 October at four o'clock in the morning, and she was guillotined at noon. Courtois reportedly discovered Marie-Antoinette's will among Robespierre's papers, concealed beneath his bed.

On 25 October, the Revolutionary government faced accusations of inaction. Several members of the Committee of General Security, aided by armées revolutionnaires, were dispatched to quell active resistance against the Revolution in the provinces. Robespierre's landlord, Maurice Duplay, became a member of the Revolutionary Tribunal. On 31 October, Brissot and twenty-one other Girondins were guillotined.

=== November 1793 ===
On the morning of 14 November, François Chabot allegedly barged into Robespierre's room, dragging him from bed with accusations of counter-revolution and a foreign conspiracy. Chabot waved a hundred thousand livres in assignat notes, claiming that a group of royalist plotters had given it to him to buy votes. Chabot was arrested three days later; Courtois urged Danton to return to Paris immediately.

On 25 November, the remains of the Comte de Mirabeau were removed from the Pantheon and replaced with those of Jean-Paul Marat. Robespierre initiated this change upon discovering that Mirabeau had secretly conspired with the court of Louis XVI in his final months. At the end of November, under intense emotional pressure from Lyonnaise women, who protested and gathered 10,000 signatures, Robespierre proposed the establishment of a secret commission to examine the cases of the Lyon rebels and investigate potential injustices.

=== December 1793 ===
On 3 December, according to reports in the Moniteur universel, Robespierre accused Danton of feigning an illness to emigrate to Switzerland. Danton, according to him, showed too often his vices and not his virtue. Robespierre was stopped in his attack. The gathering was closed after applause for Danton. On 4 December, by the Law of Revolutionary Government, the independence of departmental and local authorities came to an end when extensive powers of the Committee of Public Safety were codified. Submitted by Billaud and implemented within 24 hours, the law was a drastic decision against the independence of deputies and commissionaires on a mission; coordinated action among the sections became illegal. On 5 December, the journalist Camille Desmoulins launched a new journal, Le Vieux Cordelier. He defended Danton, attacked the de-Christianisers, and later compared Robespierre with Julius Caesar as dictator. Robespierre made a counterproposal of setting up a Committee of Justice to examine some of the cases under the Law of Suspects. Seventy-three deputies who had voted against the insurrection on 2 June were allowed to take their seats in the Convention. On 6 December, Robespierre warned in the Convention against the dangers of dechristianisation, and attacked "all violence or threats contrary to the freedom of religion".

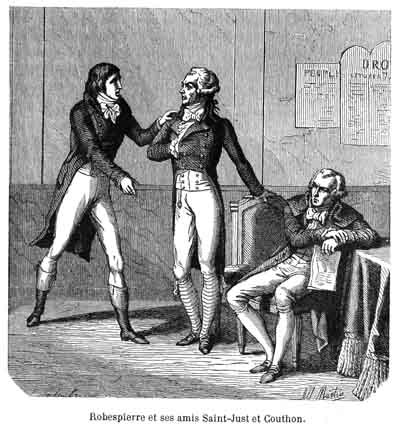
Triumvirate of: (L-R) Saint-Just, Robespierre, and Couthon

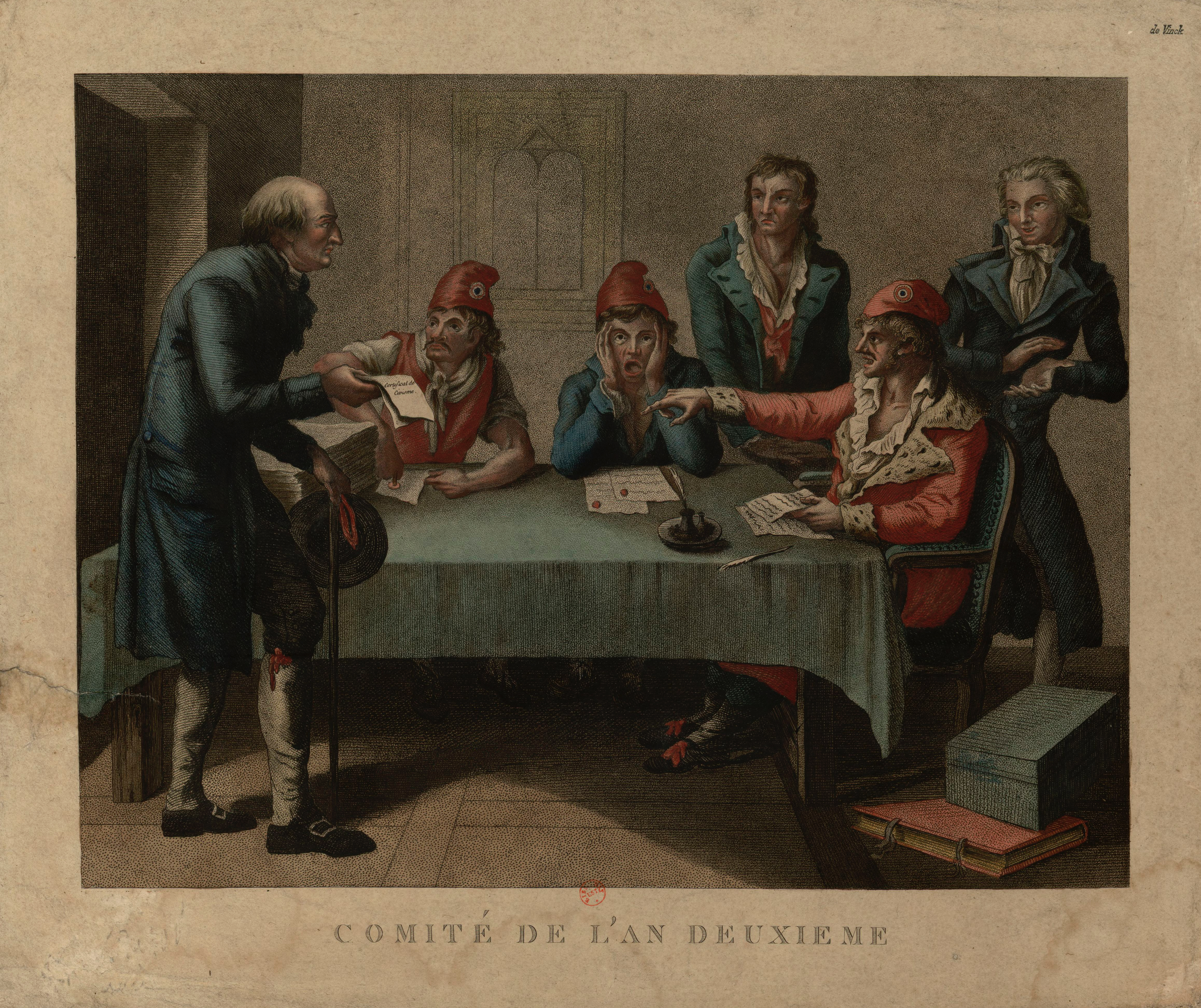
Print representing a Comité de surveillance of the Parisian section of the year II, after Jean-Baptiste Huet. (National Library of France, Paris.)

On 12 December, Robespierre attacked the wealthy foreigner Cloots in the Jacobin club of being a Prussian spy. Robespierre denounced the "de-Christianisers" as foreign enemies. The Indulgents mounted an attack on the Committee of Public Safety, accusing them of being murderers. Desmoulins addressed Robespierre directly, writing, "My dear Robespierre... my old school friend... Remember the lessons of history and philosophy: love is stronger, more lasting than fear."

On 25 December, provoked by Desmoulins' insistent challenges, Robespierre produced his "Report on the Principles of Revolutionary Government". Robespierre replied to the plea for an end to the Terror, justifying the collective authority of the National Convention, administrative centralisation, and the purging of local authorities. He said he had to avoid two cliffs: indulgence and severity. He could not consult the 18th-century political authors, because they had not foreseen such a course of events. He protested against the various factions that he believed threatened the government, such as the Hébertists and Dantonists. Robespierre strongly believed that the strict legal system was still necessary:

The theory of the revolutionary government is as new as the revolution from which this government was born. This theory may not be found in the books of the political writers who were unable to predict the Revolution, nor in the law books of the tyrants...

The goal of a constitutional government is the protection of the Republic; that of a revolutionary government is the establishment of the Republic.

The Revolution is the war waged by liberty against its foes—but the Constitution is the régime of victorious and peaceful freedom.

The Revolutionary Government will need to put forth extraordinary activity, because it is at war. It is subject to no constant laws, since the circumstances under which it prevails are those of a storm, and change with every moment. This government is obliged unceasingly to disclose new sources of energy to oppose the rapidly changing face of danger.

Robespierre would suppress chaos and anarchy: "the Government has to defend itself" [against conspirators] and "to the enemies of the people it owes only death". R. R. Palmer and Donald C. Hodges have interpreted the report as an early formulation of a theory of revolutionary dictatorship. By contrast, Simon Schama emphasized its connection to the revolutionary government consolidated by the Law of 14 Frimaire and the political crises confronting the Republic in 1793–1794.

=== February–March 1794 ===
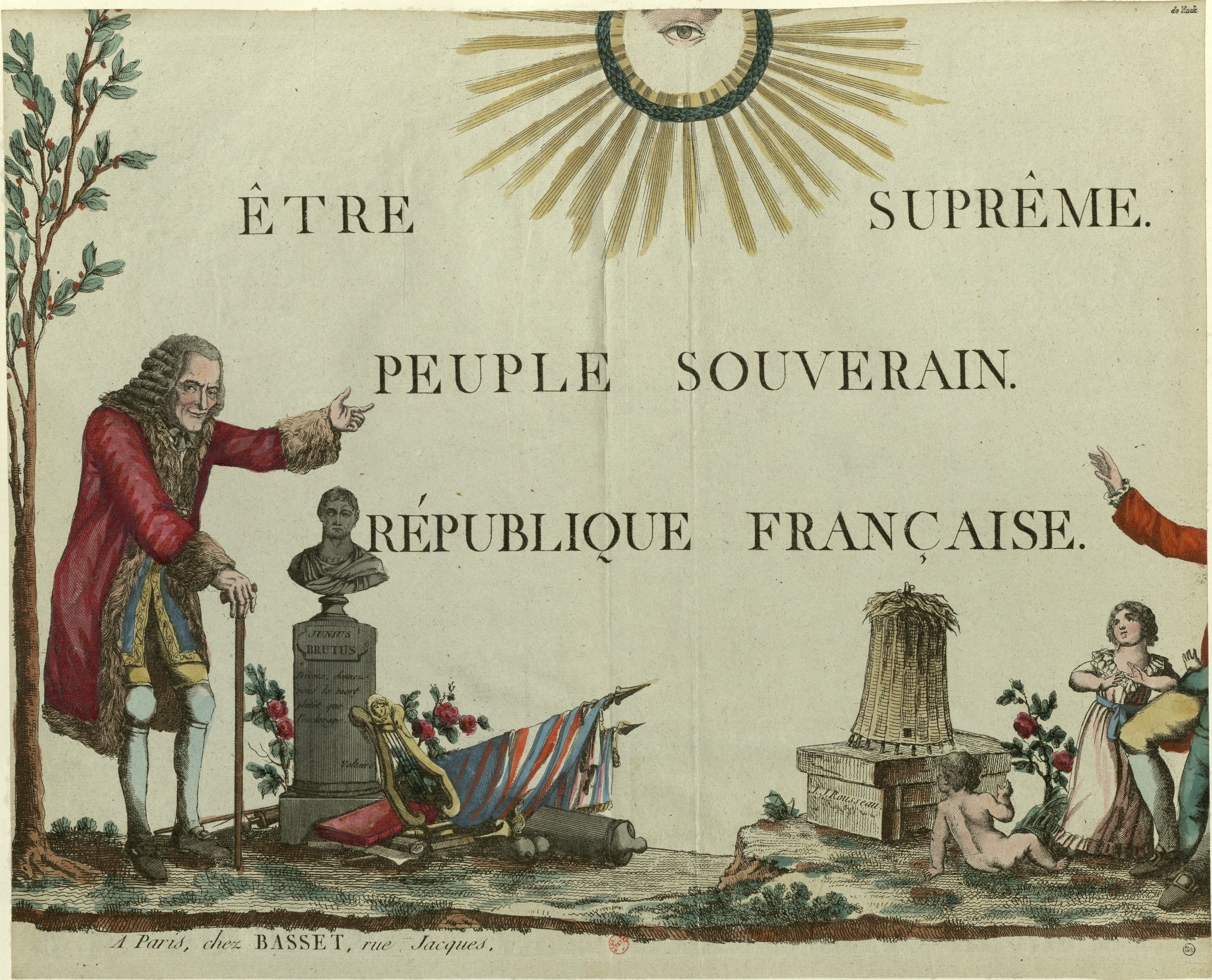
1794 print with the slogan "Supreme Being, Sovereign People, French Republic". An elderly Voltaire is depicted along with a bust of Brutus and the grave of Rousseau.

In his Report on the Principles of Political Morality made on 5 February, Robespierre praised the revolutionary government and argued that both terror and virtue were necessary:

If the spring of popular government in time of peace is virtue, the springs of popular government in revolution are at once virtue and terror: virtue, without which terror is fatal; terror, without which virtue is powerless. Terror is nothing other than justice, prompt, severe, inflexible; it is therefore an emanation of virtue; it is not so much a special principle as it is a consequence of the general principle of democracy applied to our country's most urgent needs.

It has been said that terror is the principle of despotic government. Does your government therefore resemble despotism? Yes, as the sword that gleams in the hands of the heroes of liberty resembles that with which the henchmen of tyranny are armed. Let the despot govern by terror his brutalized subjects; he is right, as a despot. Subdue by terror the enemies of liberty, and you will be right, as founders of the Republic. The government of the revolution is liberty's despotism against tyranny. Is force made only to protect crime? And is the thunderbolt not destined to strike the heads of the proud?

To punish the oppressors of humanity is clemency; to forgive them is barbarity.

Aulard sums up the Jacobin train of thought: "All politics, according to Robespierre, must tend to establish the reign of virtue and confound vice. He reasoned thus: those who are virtuous are right; error is a corruption of the heart; error cannot be sincere; error is always deliberate." According to the German journalist K. E. Oelsner, Robespierre behaved "more like a leader of a religious sect than of a political party. He can be eloquent but most of the time he is boring, especially when he goes on too long, which is often the case."

From 13 February to 13 March, Robespierre had withdrawn from active business on the Committee due to illness. Robespierre seems to have suffered from acute physical and mental exhaustion, exacerbated by an austere personal regime, according to McPhee. Saint-Just was elected president of the Convention for the next two weeks. On 19 February, Robespierre decided to return to the Duplays.

In early March, in a speech at the Cordeliers Club, Hébert attacked both Robespierre and Danton as being too soft. Hébert used the latest issue of Le Père Duchesne to criticise Robespierre. There were queues and near-riots at the shops and in the markets; there were strikes and threatening public demonstrations. Some of the Hébertistes and their friends were calling for a new insurrection. Robespierre managed to acquire a small army of secret agents who reported to him.

A majority of the Committee decided that the ultra-left Hébertists would have to perish or their opposition within the committee would overshadow the other factions due to its influence in the Commune of Paris. Robespierre also had personal reasons for disliking the Hébertists for their "bloodthirstiness" and atheism, which he associated with the old aristocracy. On the night of 13–14 March, Hébert and 18 of his followers were arrested as the agents of foreign powers. On 15 March, Robespierre reappeared in the Convention. (Note: On 16 March Robespierre was sharply critical of Amar's report, which presented the scandal around Fabre and Chabot as purely a matter of fraud. Robespierre insisted that it was a foreign plot, demanded that the report be re-written, and used the scandal as the basis for rhetorical attacks on William Pitt the Younger whom he believed was involved.) The next day, Robespierre denounced a petition demanding that all merchants should be excluded from public offices while the war lasted. Subsequently, he joined Saint-Just in his attacks on Hébert. The leaders of the "armées révolutionnaires" were denounced by the Revolutionary Tribunal as accomplices of Hébert. Their armies were dissolved on 27 March. Robespierre protected Hanriot, the commander of the Paris National Guards, and Pache. (Note: On 27 March 1794, on the proposal of Barère, the armée révolutionnaire, which had been active in and around Paris for nearly seven months, was disbanded, except for its artillery. Its volunteers could return home or enlist individually in existing infantry and cavalry units. Their infantry and cavalry seem to be merged with other regiments.) Around twenty people, including Hébert, Cloots and De Kock, were guillotined on the evening of 24 March. On 25 March, Condorcet was arrested, as he was seen as an enemy of the Revolution; he committed suicide two days later.

On 29 March, Danton met again with Robespierre privately. On 30 March the two committees decided to arrest Danton and Desmoulins. On 31 March, Saint-Just publicly attacked both. In the Convention, criticism was voiced against the arrests, which Robespierre silenced with "whoever trembles at this moment is guilty." Legendre suggested that "before you listen to any report, you send for the prisoners, and hear them". Robespierre replied, "It would be violating the laws of impartiality to grant to Danton what was refused to others, who had an equal right to make the same demand." This answer silenced at once all solicitations in his favour. No friend of the Dantonists dared speak up in case he too should be accused of putting friendship before virtue.

=== April 1794 ===
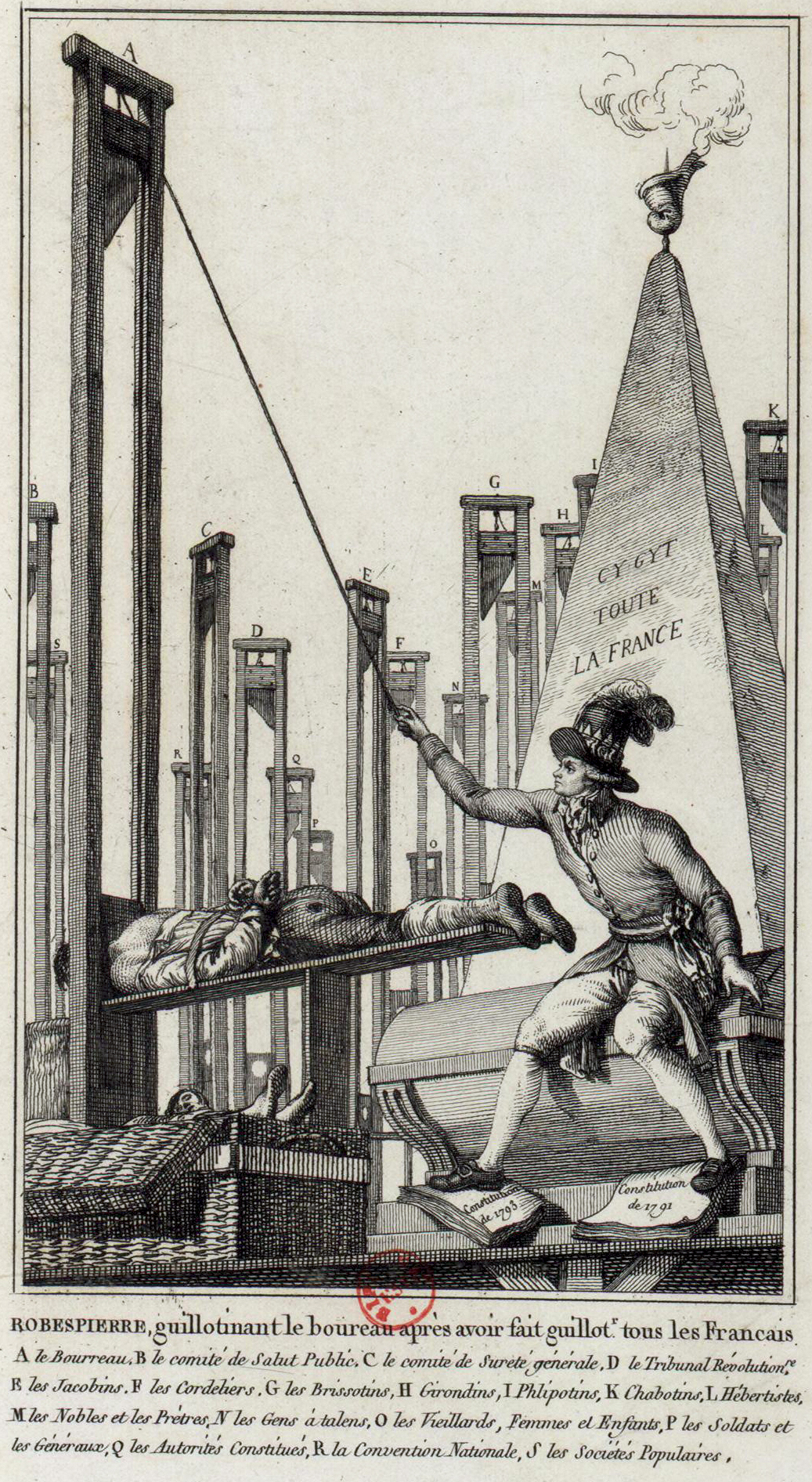
Cartoon showing Robespierre guillotining the executioner after having guillotined everyone else in France.

Danton, Desmoulins, and several others faced trial from 3 to 5 April before the Revolutionary Tribunal, presided over by Martial Herman. Described as more politically charged than criminally focused, the trial proceeded in an irregular manner. Hanriot had been informed not to arrest the president and the "public accuser" of the Revolutionary Tribunal. The accusations of theft, corruption, and the scandal involving the French East India Company paved the way for Danton's downfall, accusing him of conspiracy with count Mirabeau, Marquis de Lafayette, the Duke of Orléans and Dumouriez. In Robespierre's eyes, the Dantonists had ceased to be true patriots, instead prioritising personal and foreign interests over the nation's welfare. Following Robespierre's advice, a decree was accepted to present Saint-Just's account on Danton's alleged royalist tendencies at the tribunal, effectively ending further debates and restraining any further insults to justice by the accused.

Fouquier-Tinville asked the tribunal to order the defendants who "confused the hearing" and insulted "National Justice" to the guillotine. Desmoulins struggled to accept his fate and accused Robespierre, the Committee of General Security, and the Revolutionary Tribunal. He was dragged up the scaffold by force.

On the last day of their trial, Desmoulins's wife, Lucile Desmoulins, was imprisoned. She was accused of organising a revolt against the patriots and the tribunal to free her husband and Danton. She admitted to having warned the prisoners of a course of events as in September 1792, and that it was her duty to revolt against it. Robespierre was not only his school friend but also had witnessed at their marriage in December 1790, together with Pétion and Brissot. Following the executions of Danton and Desmoulins on 5 April, Robespierre had a partial withdrawal from public life. He did not reappear until 7 May. The withdrawal may have been an indication of health issues.

On 1 April, Lazare Carnot proposed the provisional executive council of six ministers be suppressed and the ministries be replaced by twelve Committees reporting to the Committee of Public Safety. The proposal was unanimously adopted by the National Convention and set up by Martial Herman on 8 April. On 3 April, Fouché was invited to Paris. On 9 April, he appeared in the Convention; in the evening he visited Robespierre at home. On 12 April, his report was discussed in the Convention; according to Robespierre, it was incomplete. When Barras and Fréron paid a visit to Robespierre, they were received in an extremely unfriendly manner. At the request of Robespierre, the Convention ordered the transfer of the ashes of Jean-Jacques Rousseau to the Panthéon.

On 22 April, Malesherbes, a lawyer who had defended the king and the deputés Isaac René Guy le Chapelier and Jacques Guillaume Thouret, four times elected president of the Constituent Assembly, were taken to the scaffold. The decree of 8 May suppressed the revolutionary courts and committees in the provinces and brought all political cases for trial in the capital. The police bureau, directed by Martial Herman, became a serious rival of the Committee of General Security after a month. Payan even advised Robespierre to get rid of the Committee of General Security, saying it broke the unity of action of the government.

=== June 1794 ===
On 10 June, Georges Couthon introduced the Law of 22 Prairial to liberate the Revolutionary Tribunals from Convention control while severely restricting suspects' ability to defend themselves. The law significantly expanded the scope of charges, criminalising virtually any criticism of the government. Legal defence was sidelined in favour of efficiency and centralisation, as all assistance for defendants before the revolutionary tribunal was outlawed. The Tribunal transformed into a court of condemnation, denying suspects the right to counsel and offering only two verdicts: complete acquittal or death, often based more on jurors' moral convictions than evidence. Within three days, 156 people were sent in batches to the guillotine, including all the members of Parlement of Toulouse. On 11 July, shopkeepers, craftsmen, and others were temporarily released from prison due to overcrowding, with over 8,000 "suspects" initially confined by the start of Thermidor Year II (in the French Revolutionary calendar), according to François Furet. Paris saw a doubling of death sentences.

== Abolition of slavery ==
Réglements de la Société des Amis des Noirs, 1788–1789

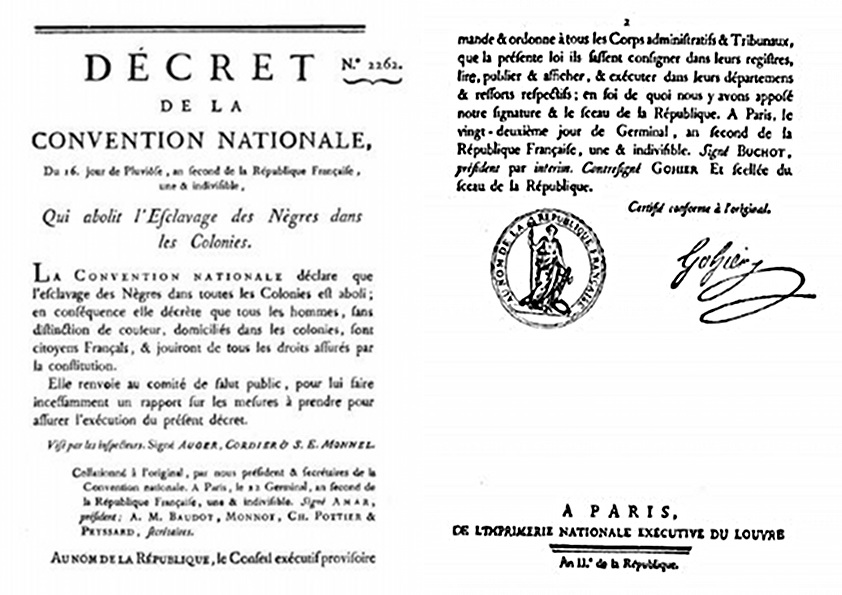
Décret d'abolition de l'esclavage du 16 pluviôse an II (4 February 1794), decree abolishing slavery in all the colonies

Robespierre's stance on abolition exhibits certain contradictions, prompting doubts about his intentions regarding slavery.

On 13 May 1791, he opposed the inclusion of the term "slaves" in a law, vehemently denouncing the slave trade. He emphasised that slavery contradicted the Declaration of the Rights of Man and of the Citizen. On 15 May 1791, the Constituent Assembly granted citizenship to "all people of colour born of free parents". Robespierre passionately argued in the Assembly against the Colonial Committee, which was composed predominantly of plantation owners and slaveholders in the Caribbean. The colonial lobby contended that granting political rights to black people would lead to France losing her colonies. In response, Robespierre asserted, "We should not compromise the interests humanity holds most dear, the sacred rights of a significant number of our fellow citizens," later exclaiming, "Perish the colonies, if it will cost you your happiness, your glory, your freedom. Perish the colonies!". Robespierre expressed fury at the assembly's decision to grant "constitutional sanction to slavery in the colonies", and advocating equal political rights regardless of skin colour. Despite the decree, the colonial whites refused to comply the decree, leading them to contemplate separation from France thereafter.

Robespierre did not advocate the immediate abolition of slavery. However, proponents of slavery in France viewed Robespierre as a "bloodthirsty innovator" and accused him of conspiring to surrender French colonies to England. On 4 April 1792, Louis XVI affirmed the Jacobin decree, which granted equal political rights to free blacks and mulattoes in Saint-Domingue. On 2 June 1792, the National Assembly appointed a three-man Civil Commission, led by Léger Félicité Sonthonax, to travel to Saint-Domingue and ensure the enforcement of the 4 April decree. However, the commission eventually issued a proclamation of general emancipation that included black slaves. Robespierre condemned the slave trade in a speech before the Convention in April 1793.

Ask a merchant of human flesh what is property; he will answer by showing you that long coffin he calls a ship... Ask a gentleman [the same] who has lands and vassals... and he will give you almost the identical ideas.

— Robespierre, "The Principles of Property", 24 April 1793.

Babeuf urged Chaumette to spearhead efforts to persuade the Convention to adopt the seven additional articles proposed by Maximilien Robespierre on 24 April 1793, regarding the scale and scope of property rights, to be incorporated into the new Declaration of Rights. On 3 June 1793, Robespierre attended a Jacobin meeting to lend support for a decree aimed at ending slavery. On 4 June 1793, a delegation of sans-culottes and men of colour, led by Chaumette, presented a petition to the Convention requesting the general emancipation of the blacks in the colonies. The abolition of slavery was officially included into the Declaration of the Rights of Man and Citizen of 1793. The radical 1793 constitution, championed by Robespierre and the Montagnards, was ratified in August through a national referendum. It granted universal suffrage to French men and explicitly condemned slavery. However, the French Constitution of 1793 was never put in effect.

Starting in August, former slaves in St Domingue were granted "all the rights of French citizens". In August 1793, an increasing number of slaves in St Domingue initiated a Haitian Revolution against slavery and colonial domination. Robespierre, however, prioritised the rights of free people of color over those of the enslaved. On 31 October 1793, slavery was officially abolished in St Domingue. Robespierre criticised the actions of the former governor of Saint-Domingue Sonthonax and Étienne Polverel, who initially had freed slaves in Haïti, but then proposed arming them. Robespierre also cautioned the Committee against relying on white individuals to govern the colony. In 1794 the National Convention passed a decree abolishing slavery in all the colonies. On the day following the emancipation decree, Robespierre addressed the Convention, lauding the French as pioneers to "summon all men to equality and liberty, and their full rights as citizens". Although Robespierre mentioned slavery twice in his speech, he did not specifically reference the French colonies. Despite petitions from the slaveholding delegation, the Convention resolved to fully endorse the decree. However, its implementation and application were limited to St Domingue (1793), Guadeloupe (December 1794) and French Guiana.

The National Convention declares the abolition of negro slavery in all the Colonies; consequently it decrees that all men, without distinction of color, domiciled in the Colonies, are French citizens, and will enjoy all the rights assured by the constitution.

Robespierre's stance on the decree of 16 Pluviose year II regarding the emancipation of the slaves remains a topic of contention. French historian Claude Mazauric interpreted Robespierre's cautious approach in February 1794 toward the abolition decree as an attempt to avoid controversy. On 11 April 1794, the decree underwent alterations, with Robespierre endorsing orders to ratify it. This decree significantly bolstered the Republic's popularity among the Black population of Saint Domingue, many of whom had already liberated themselves and sought military alliances to safeguard their freedom. In May 1794, Toussaint Louverture aligned with the French after the Spanish, who he was fighting under, refused to abolish slavery. Following the events of 9–10 Thermidor, an anti-slavery campaign emerged targeting Robespierre. Critics accused him of attempting to perpetuate slavery, despite its abolition by the Convention on 4 February 1794, following the precedent set by Sonthonax's abolition decree in August 1793 in Saint Domingue.

== Cult of the Supreme Being ==
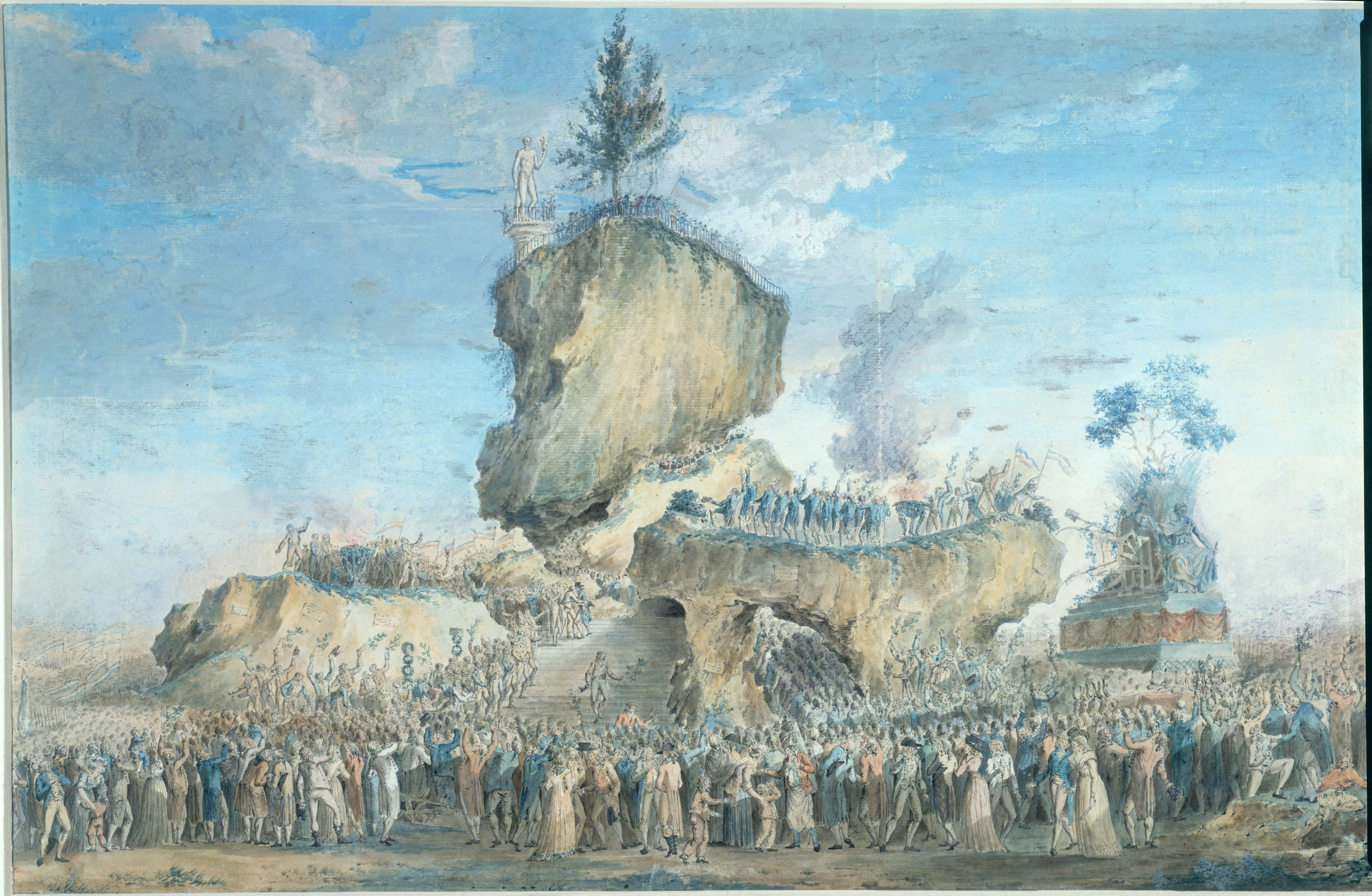
Stage of the Festival of the Supreme Being constructed by Maurice Duplay.

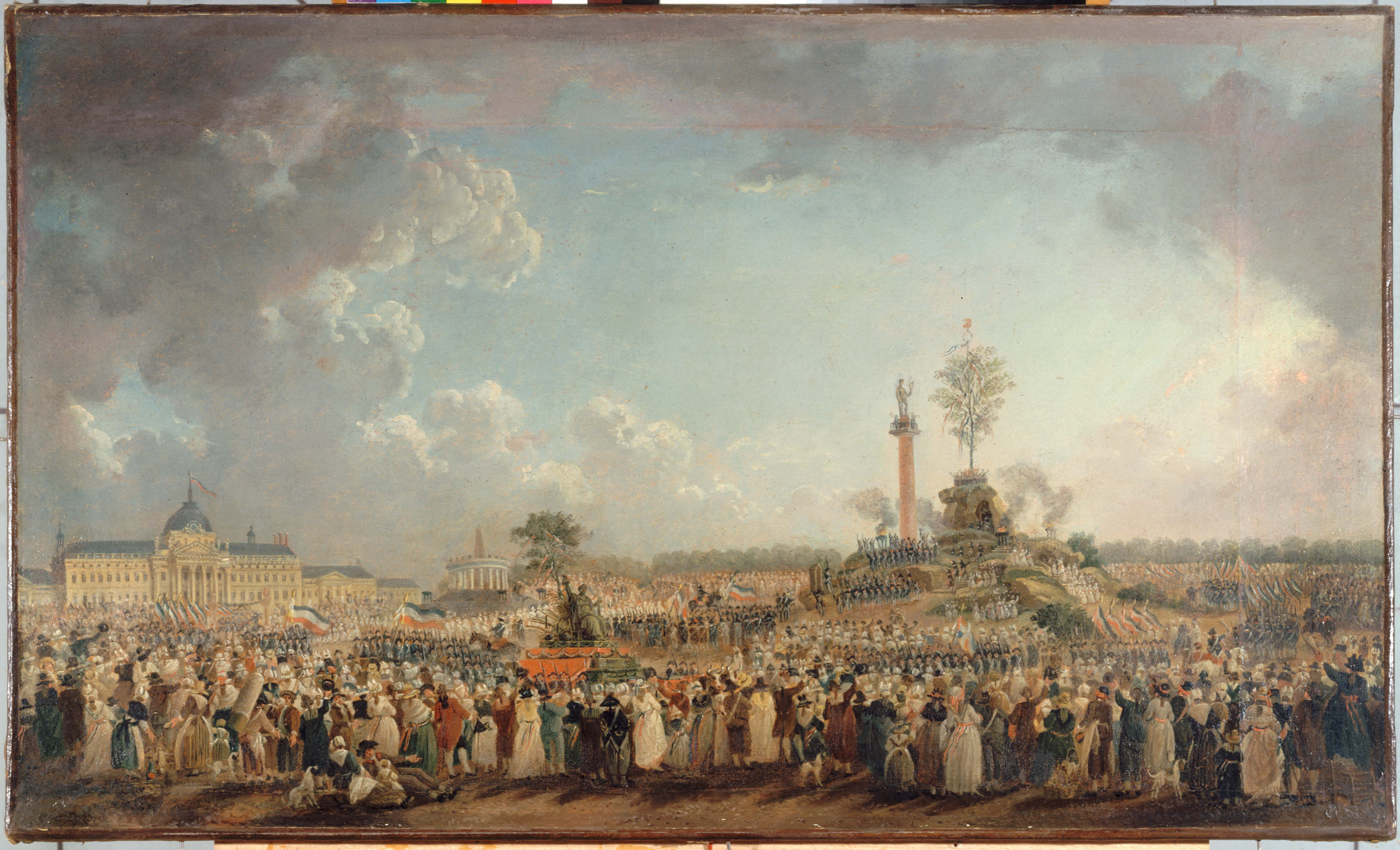
The Festival of the Supreme Being, by Pierre-Antoine Demachy (1794)

Robespierre's quest for revolutionary change extended beyond politics to his opposition to the Catholic Church and its policies, particularly clerical celibacy. Despite denouncing excesses in the dechristianisation efforts of his political adversaries, he aimed to rejuvenate spirituality in France through deist beliefs. On 6 May 1794, Robespierre announced the Committee of Public Safety's recognition of the existence of God and the immortality of the human soul. The following day, he delivered a detailed presentation to the Convention on religious and moral principles intertwined with republican ideals, introducing festivals dedicated to the Supreme Being and other virtues.

On 8 June, during the "Festival of the Supreme Being", Robespierre made his public debut as a leader and Convention president, expressing his passion for virtue, nature, and deist beliefs. Climaxing at the Champ de Mars, he delivered speeches emphasising his concept of a Supreme Being devoid of religious figures like Jesus or Mohammed. Criticism ensued, with some accusing him of aspiring to godhood and creating a new religion, particularly after allegations of involvement in Catherine Théot's prophecy conspiracy. The Cult of the Supreme Being that he championed aroused suspicion among anticlericals and political factions, leading to doubts about his grasp on reality and ultimately contributing to his downfall. According to Madame de Staël, this period marked Robespierre's decline.

== Downfall ==
=== May–June 1794 ===
On 20 May, Robespierre signed Theresa Cabarrus's arrest warrant, and on 23 May, following an attempted assassination on Collot d'Herbois, Cécile Renault was arrested near Robespierre's residence with two penknives. She was executed on 17 June. Robespierre refused to reunite dispersed families in different prisons into common detention facilities, citing security concerns after the assassination attempt.

The Law of 22 Prairial, introduced on 10 June without consultation from the Committee of General Security intensified the conflict between the two committees, and led to a doubling of executions in Paris. Moderate judges were dismissed; Robespierre ensured only his supporters became judges, marking the beginning of the "Great Terror". Between 10 June and 27 July, another 1,366 people were executed. There was widespread agreement among deputies that their parliamentary immunity, in place since 1 April 1793, had become perilous.

On 11 June, Robespierre accused Fouché of leading a conspiracy and on 12 June, he appeared in the Convention to denounce his opponents for trying to turn the Montagnards against the government, claiming a conspiracy to discredit him. Facing minority opposition on 12 and 13 June, Robespierre withdrew, vowing not to return to the committee while the conflict persisted. His presidency of the Convention ended on 18 June. Robespierre also censured the journalists of the Moniteur Universel. By the end of June, Saint-Just, realising Robespierre's political decline, was recalled hastily. Robespierre's deteriorating health and increasing irrationality led to calls for more purges, ultimately losing him favour within the committees. Carnot described Saint-Just and Robespierre as "ridiculous dictators".

=== July 1794 ===
On 1 July, Robespierre addressed the Jacobin club, denouncing slanders against him in London and Paris. He stormed out of a Committee meeting on 3 July, expressing resignation from saving the country without his involvement. The following day, he lamented his failing health and excluded Tallien from the Jacobin club. On 14 July, Robespierre had Fouché expelled.

He rarely appeared in the Convention for forty days but signed decrees by the Committee of Public Safety; he stopped working with the police bureau at the end of June. Robespierre occasionally sought refuge in Maisons-Alfort, 12 km (7.5 mi) outside of Paris. He walked through the fields and along the Marne river with his Danish dog. He had four friends in the revolutionary government, Couthon and Saint-Just in the Committee of Public Safety, and the painter Jacques-Louis David and Joseph Le Bas in the Committee of General Security, with whom he met privately, as they lived under the same roof.

Robespierre desired to maintain the Committee of General Security's subordination to the Committee of Public Safety, viewing them as acting as two separate governments. Saint-Just negotiated concessions with Barère, proposing more cooperation between committees. On 22 and 23 July, he attended a plenary session of the committees but underestimated his opponents' strength. Feeling his grip on power slipping, he commenced an attack in the Convention and decided to make himself clear with a new report. Robespierre was compared to Catiline; he himself preferred the virtues of Cato the Younger.

On Saturday, 26 July, Robespierre reappeared at the Convention and delivered a two-hour-long speech on the villainous factions. He defended himself against charges of dictatorship and tyranny and then proceeded to warn of a conspiracy against the Committee of Public Safety. Collot questioned Robespierre's motives, accusing him of seeking to become a dictator. When called upon to name those whom he accused, Robespierre simply refused, except referring to Joseph Cambon, who flew to the rostrum: "One man paralyses the will of the National Convention". His vehemence changed the course of the debate. At length, Lecointre of Versailles arose and proposed that the speech should be printed. This motion was the signal for agitation, discussion, and resistance. The Convention decided not to have the text printed, as Robespierre's speech had first to be submitted to the two committees. It contained matters sufficiently weighty that it needed to first be examined. Robespierre was surprised that his speech would be sent to the very deputies he had intended to sue. According to Saint-Just, he understood nothing of the reasons for his persecution; he knew only his misery. A bitter debate ensued until Barère forced an end to it. According to Couthon, not his speech, but the conspiracy had to be examined. Saint-Just promised to prepare a report how to break the deadlock.

In the evening, Robespierre delivered the same speech, which he regarded as his last will, at the Jacobin Club, where it was very well received. He spoke of drinking hemlock, and Jacques-Louis David cried out: "I will drink it with you." Collot d'Herbois and Billaud-Varenne were driven out because of their opposition to the printing and distribution of the text. Billaud managed to escape before he was assaulted, but Collot d'Herbois was knocked down. They set off to the Committee of Public Safety, where they found Saint-Just working. They asked him if he was drawing up their bill of indictment. Saint-Just promised to show them his speech before the session began. Collot d'Herbois, who chaired the Convention, decided not to let him speak and to make sure he could not be heard on the next day.

Gathering in secret, nine members of the two committees decided that it was all or nothing; to protect themselves, Robespierre had to be arrested. Barras said they would all die if Robespierre did not die. The crucial factor that drove them to make up their minds to join the conspiracy seems in most cases to have been emotional rather than ideological—fear of Robespierre's intentions towards them, or enmity, or revenge. The Convention had lost 144 delegates in 13 months; 67 were executed, committed suicide, or died in prison. The Convention often insisted on deputies' executions as the final steps in a process of political revival through purging. Now extremists and indulgents joined against him. Laurent Lecointre was the instigator of the coup. He contacted Robert Lindet on the 6th, and Vadier on the 7th Thermidor. Lecointre was assisted by Barère, Fréron, Barras, Tallien, Thuriot, Courtois, Rovère, Garnier de l'Aube and Guffroy. Each one of them prepared his part in the attack. They decided that Hanriot, his aides-de-camp, Lavalette and Boulanger, the public prosecutor Dumas, the family Duplay and the printer Charles-Léopold Nicolas had to be arrested first, so Robespierre would be without support. (Fouché was seen as the leader of the conspiracy but hid in a garret at the rue Saint-Honoré; little is known about his part on the actual day.)

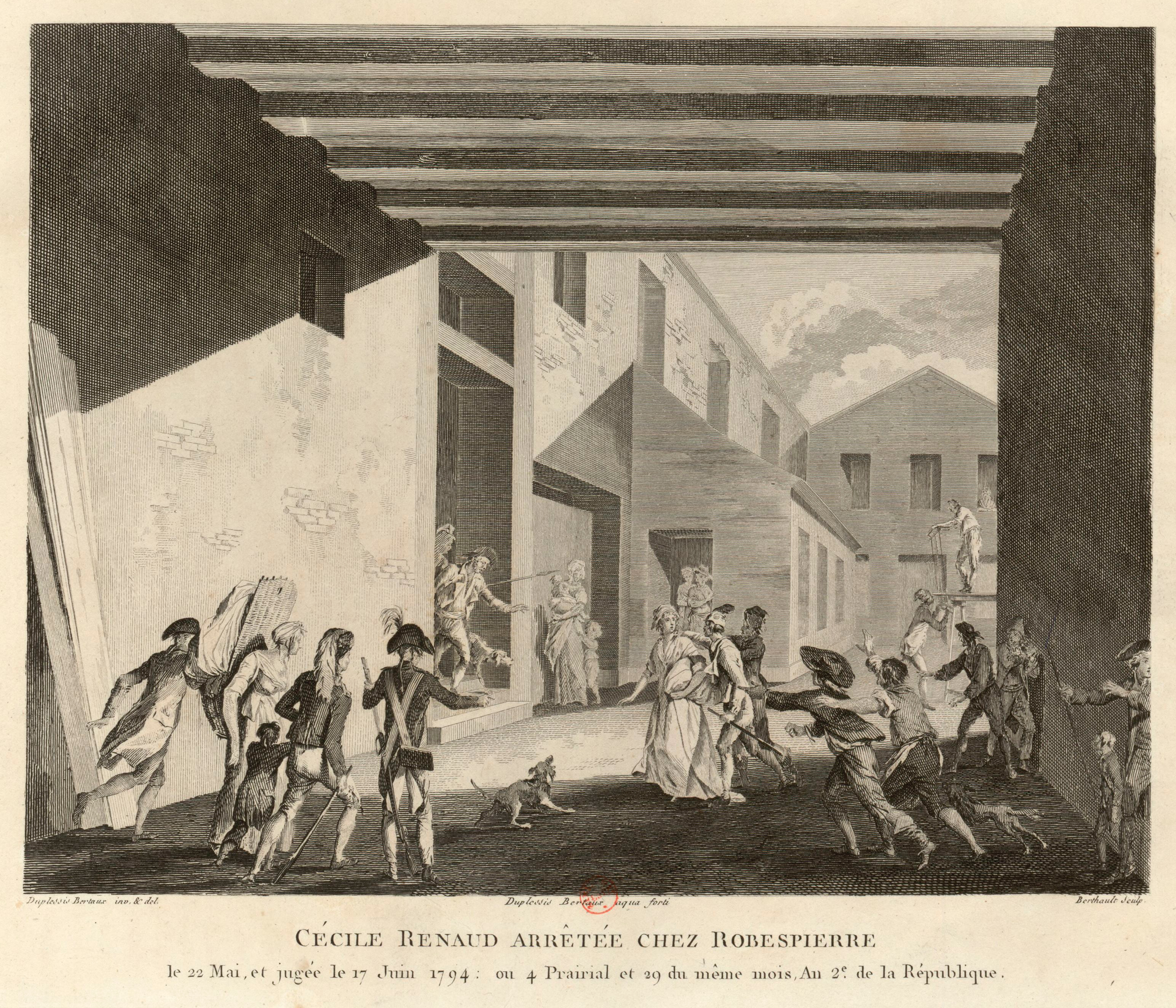
The arrest of Cécile Renaud in the courtyard of Duplay's house on 22 May 1794, etching by Matthias Gottfried Eichler after a drawing by Jean Duplessis-Bertaux.

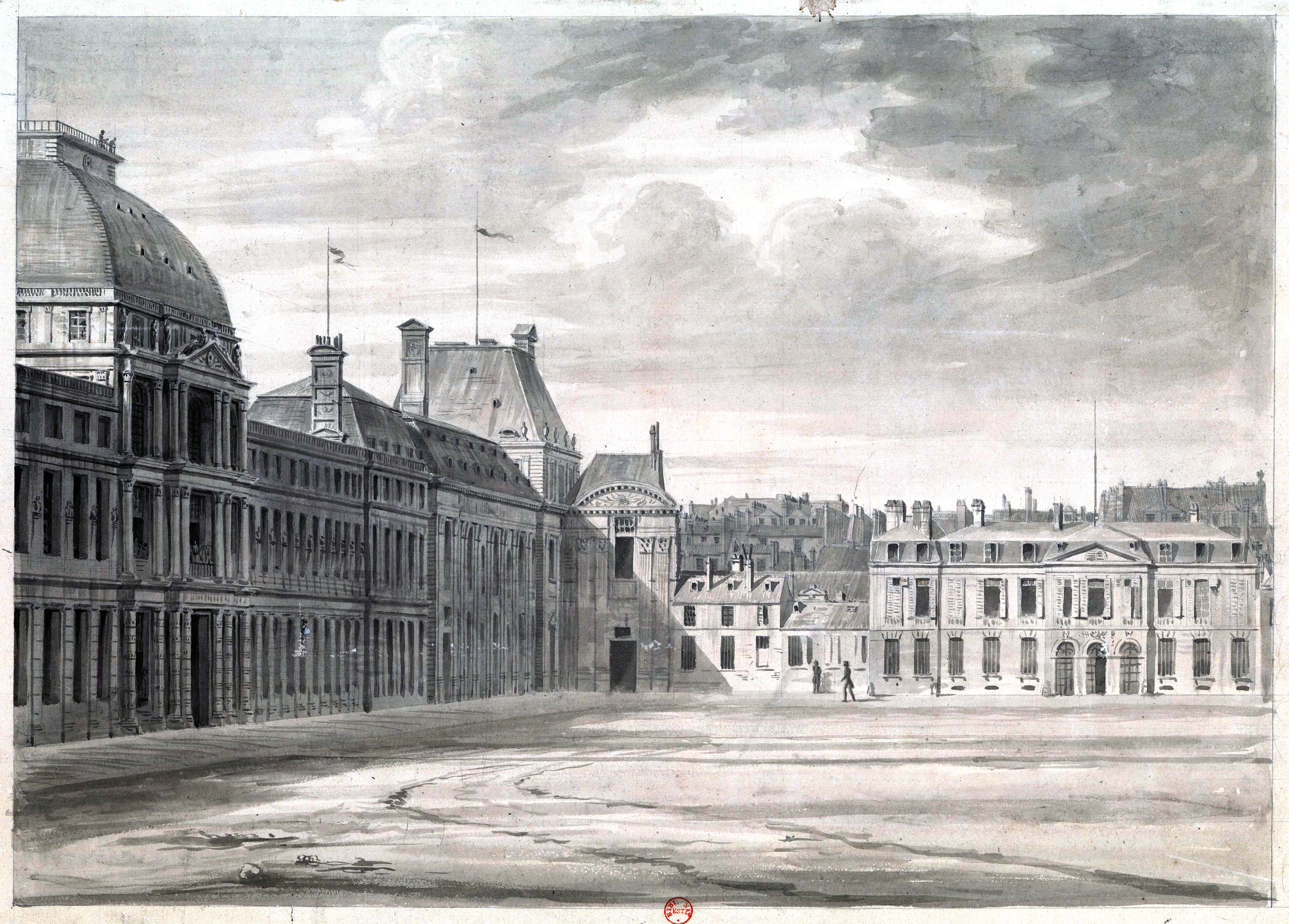
The Committee of General Security was located in Hôtel de Brionne on the right; it gathered on the first floor. (The Tuileries Palace, which housed the Convention, is on the left).

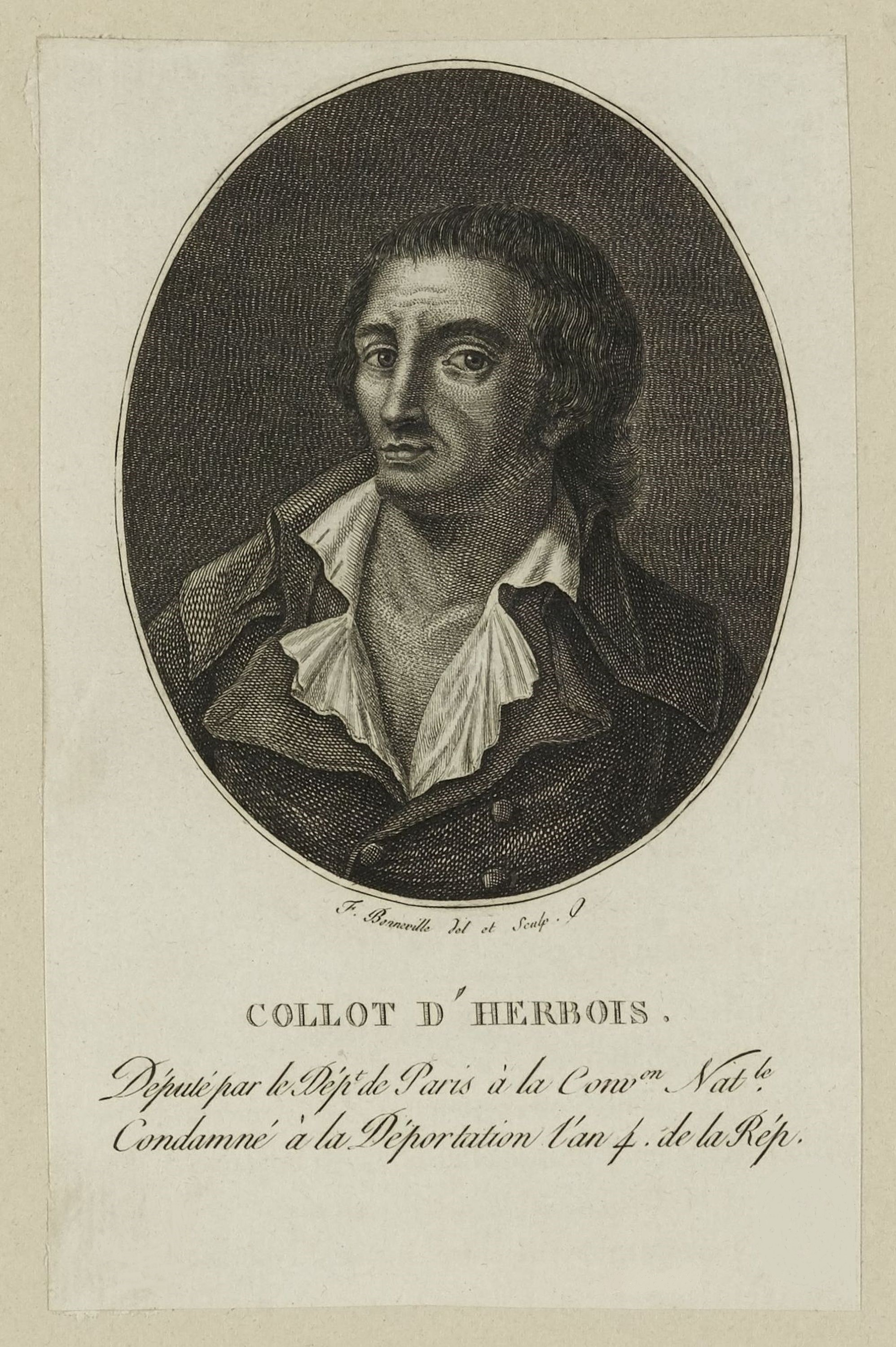
Collot d'Herbois

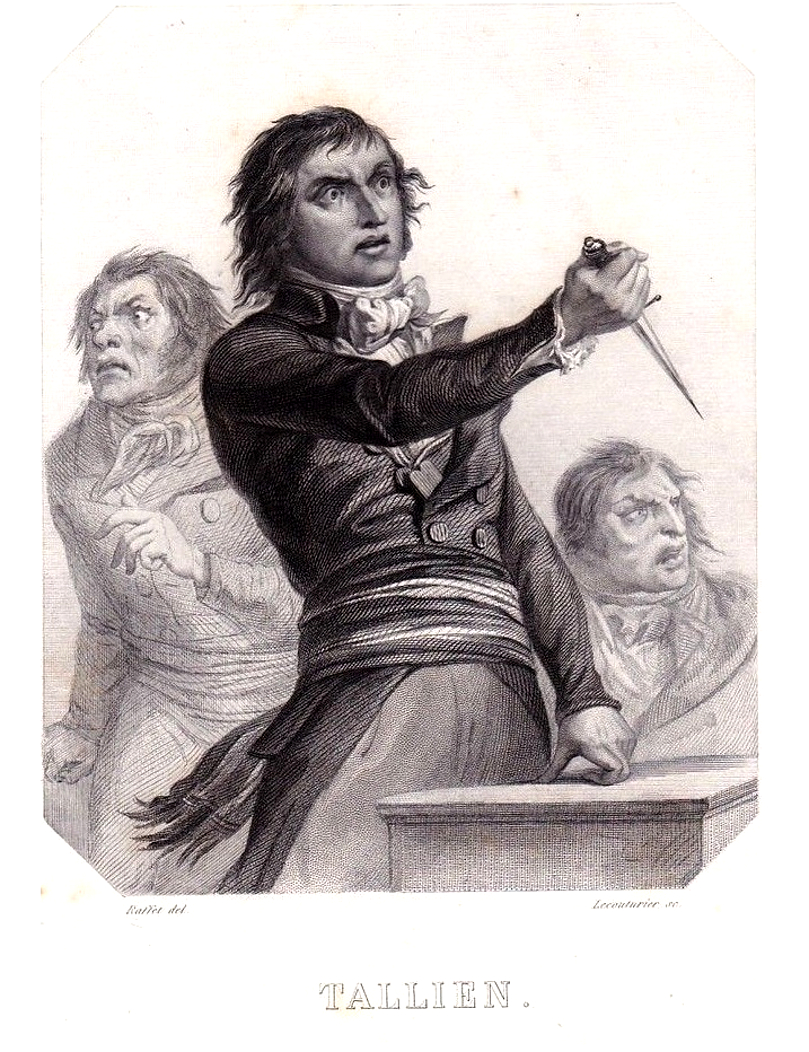
On 9 Thermidor Tallien threatened in the Convention to use his dagger if the National Convention would not order the arrest of Robespierre.

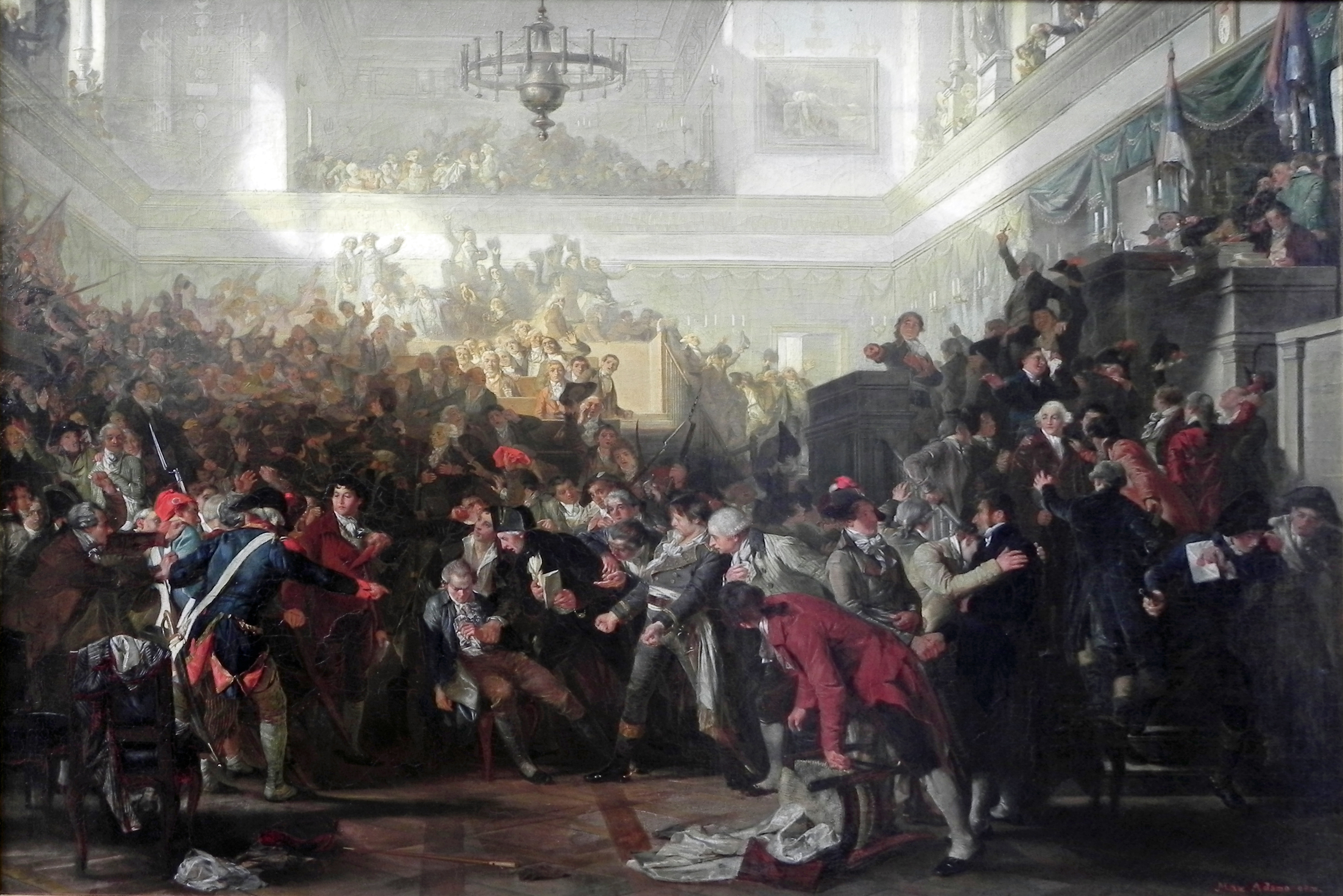
The Fall of Robespierre in the Convention on 27 July 1794

=== 9 Thermidor ===
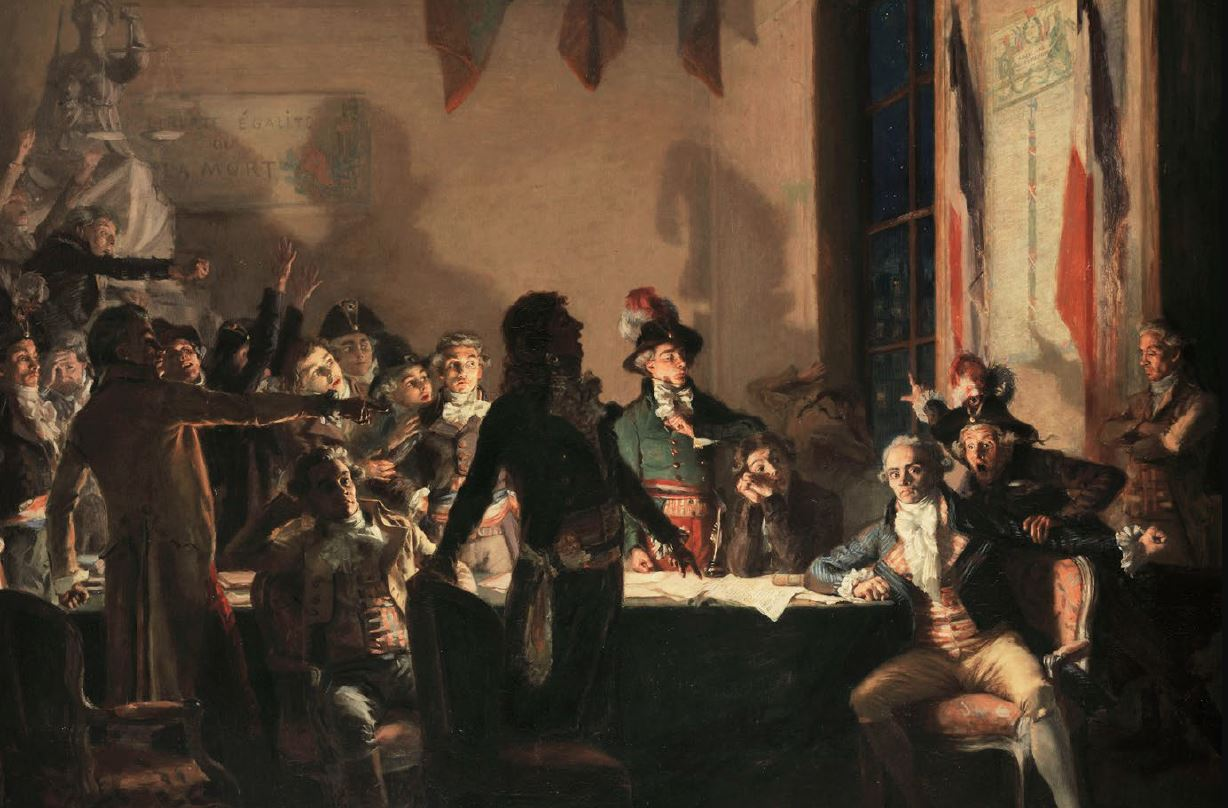
Saint-Just and Robespierre at the Hôtel de Ville on the night of 9 to 10 Thermidor Year II. Painting by Jean-Joseph Weerts

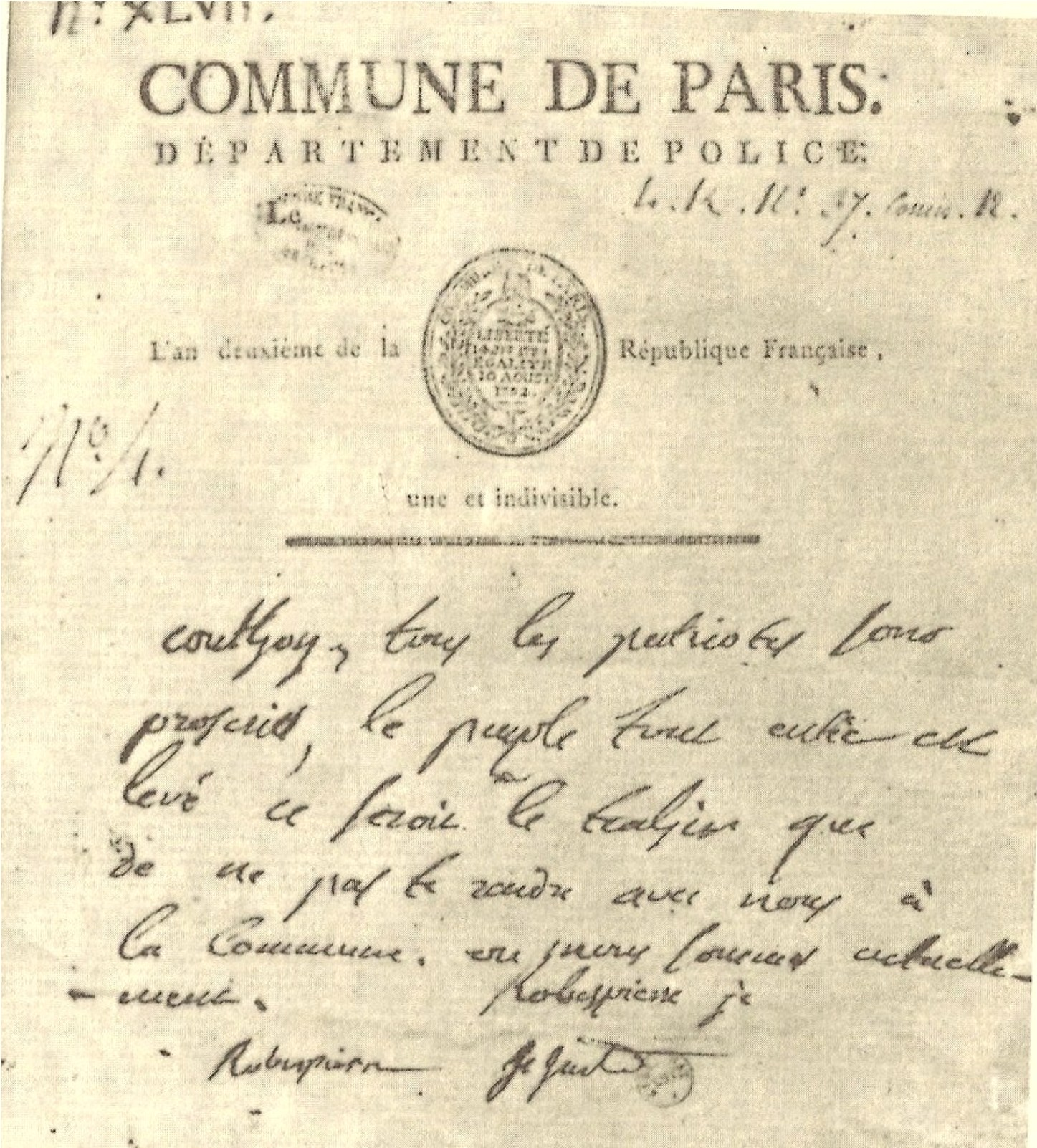
Proclamation by the Commune, found in the pocket of Couthon. Couthon was invited by Robespierre, for which they used official police writing paper.

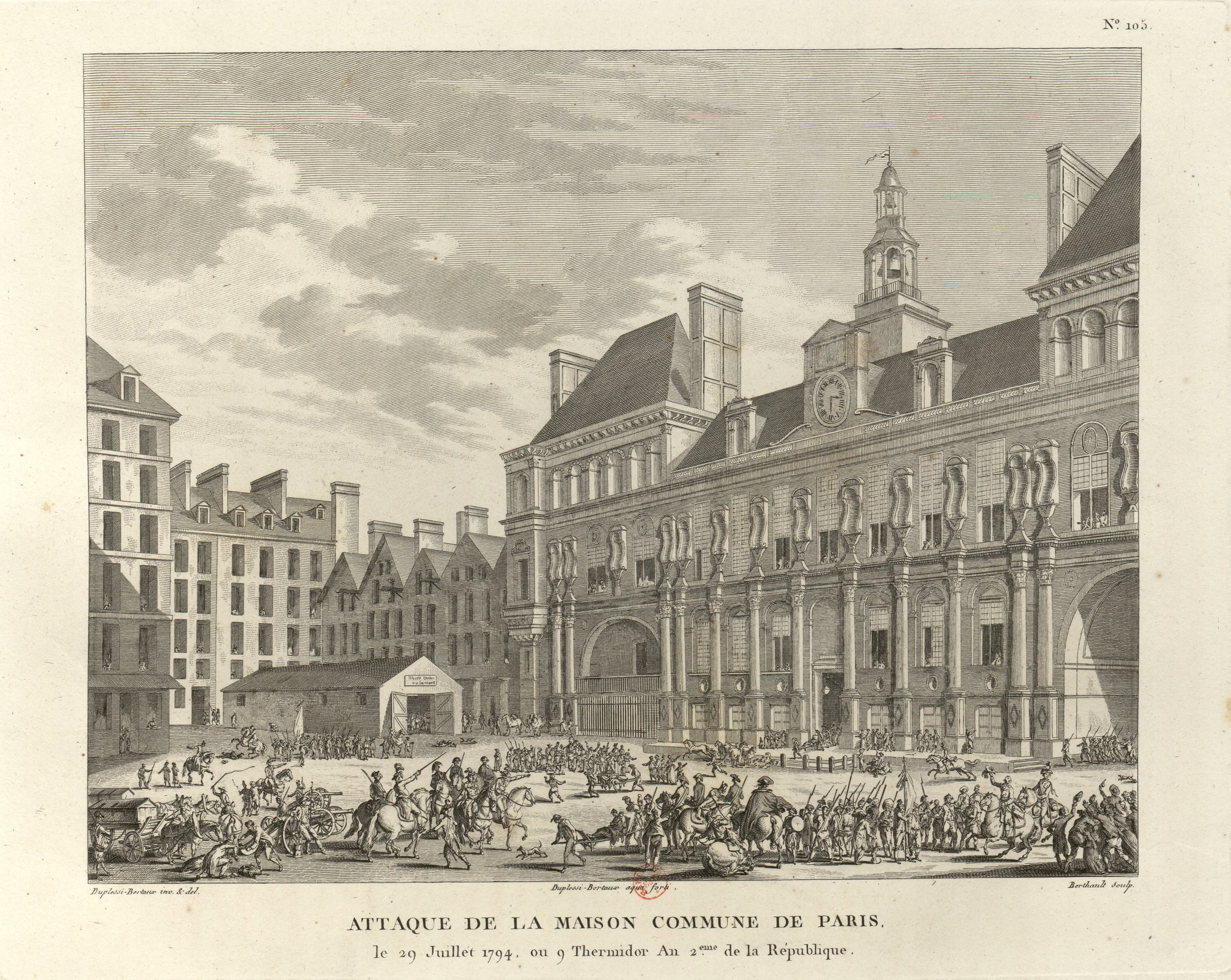
The troops of Convention Nationale attack the Commune. Print by Pierre-Gabriel Berthault and Jean Duplessis-Bertaux (1804)

At noon, Saint-Just entered the Convention and prepared to place blame on Billaud, Collot d'Herbois, and Carnot. After a few minutes, Tallien (who had a double reason for desiring Robespierre's end following Robespierre's refusal, the evening before, to release Theresa Cabarrus) interrupted him and began to speak against him. According to Tallien, "Robespierre wanted to attack us by turns, to isolate us, and finally he would be left one day only with the base and abandoned and debauched men who serve him". Almost thirty-five deputies spoke against Robespierre that day, most of them from The Mountain. As the accusations began to pile up, Saint-Just remained silent. Robespierre rushed toward the rostrum, appealed to the Plain to defend him against the Montagnards, but his voice was shouted down. Robespierre rushed to the benches of the Left but someone cried: "Get away from here; Condorcet used to sit here". He soon found himself at a loss for words after Vadier gave a mocking impression of him referring to the discovery of a letter under the mattress of the illiterate Catherine Théot. (Note: On 9 Thermidor Vadier used a letter—supposedly found under the mattress of Théot—as an opportunity to attack Robespierre and his beliefs. This letter announced to him that his mission had been prophesied in Ezekiel, that the re-establishment of religion, freed of priests, was owing to him. Vadier becoming increasingly trivial was stopped by Tallien.)

When Robespierre, very upset, was unable to speak, Garnier shouted, "The blood of Danton chokes him!" Robespierre then regained his voice: "Is it Danton you regret? ... Cowards! Why didn't you defend him?" At some time Louis Louchet called for Robespierre's arrest; Augustin Robespierre demanded to share his fate. The whole Convention agreed, including Couthon, and Saint-Just. Le Bas decided to join Saint-Just. Robespierre shouted that the revolution was lost when he descended the tribune. The five deputies were taken to the Committee of General Security and questioned.

Not long after, Hanriot was ordered to appear in the Convention; he warned the sections that there would be an attempt to murder Robespierre, and mobilised 2,400 National Guards in front of the town hall. What had happened was not very clear to Henri Sanson; either the Convention was closed down or the Paris Commune. Around six o'clock, the city council summoned an immediate meeting to consider the dangers threatening the fatherland. It gave orders to close the gates and to ring the tocsin. For the Convention, that was an illegal action without the permission of the two committees. It was decreed that anyone leading an "armed force" against the Convention would be regarded as an outlaw. The city council was in league with the Jacobins to bring off an insurrection, asking them to send over reinforcements from the galleries, "even the women who are regulars there".

=== Arrest ===
In the early evening, the five deputies were taken in a cab to different prisons; Robespierre to the Palais du Luxembourg, Couthon to "La Bourbe" and Saint-Just to the "Écossais". Augustin Robespierre was taken from Prison Saint-Lazare to La Force Prison, like Le Bas, who was refused at the Conciergerie. Around 8 p.m., Hanriot appeared at the Place du Carrousel in front of the Convention with forty armed men on horses, but was taken prisoner. After 9 p.m., the vice-president of the Tribunal Coffinhal went to the Committee of General Security with 3,000 men and their artillery. As Robespierre and his allies had been taken to a prison in the meantime, he succeeded only in freeing Hanriot and his adjutants.

How the five deputies escaped from prison was disputed. According to Le Moniteur Universel, the jailers refused to follow the order of arrest, taken by the Convention. According to Courtois and Fouquier-Tinville, the police administration was responsible for any in custody or release. Around 8 p.m., Robespierre was taken to the police administration on Île de la Cité, but refused to go to the Hôtel de Ville and insisted on being received in a prison. For legal reasons, he hesitated for possibly two hours. At around 10 p.m., the mayor sent a second delegation to go and convince Robespierre to join the Commune movement. Robespierre was taken to the Hôtel de Ville. The Convention declared the five deputies (plus the supporting members) to be outlaws. It then appointed Barras and ordered troops totalling 4,000 men to be called out.

After a whole evening spent waiting in vain for action by the Commune, losing time in fruitless deliberation without supplies or instructions, the armed sections began to disperse. Around 400 men seem to have stayed on the Place de Grève, according to Courtois. At around 2 a.m., Barras and Bourdon, accompanied by several members of the Convention, arrived in two columns. Barras deliberately advanced slowly, in the hope of avoiding conflict by a display of force. Then Grenadiers burst into the Hôtel de Ville, followed by Léonard Bourdon and the Gendarmes. Fifty-one insurgents were gathering on the first floor. Robespierre and his allies withdrew to the smaller secrétariat.

There are many stories about what happened next, but it seems in order to avoid capture, Augustin Robespierre took off his shoes and jumped from a broad cornice. He landed on some bayonets and a citizen, resulting in a pelvic fracture, several serious head contusions, and an alarming state of "weakness and anxiety". Le Bas handed a pistol to Robespierre, then killed himself with another pistol. According to Barras and Courtois, Robespierre wounded himself when he tried to commit suicide by pointing the pistol at his mouth, but the gendarme Méda prevented him from killing himself successfully. Couthon was found lying at the bottom of a staircase. Saint-Just gave himself up without a word. According to Méda, Hanriot tried to escape by a concealed staircase. According to contemporary Thermidorian reports, Hanriot was discovered at about one o'clock in the afternoon in an isolated courtyard of the Hôtel de Ville complex and was immediately taken to the Conciergerie. The same report states that Hanriot claimed to have been thrown from a third-floor window by Coffinhal. Coffinhal, who had successfully escaped, was arrested seven days later.

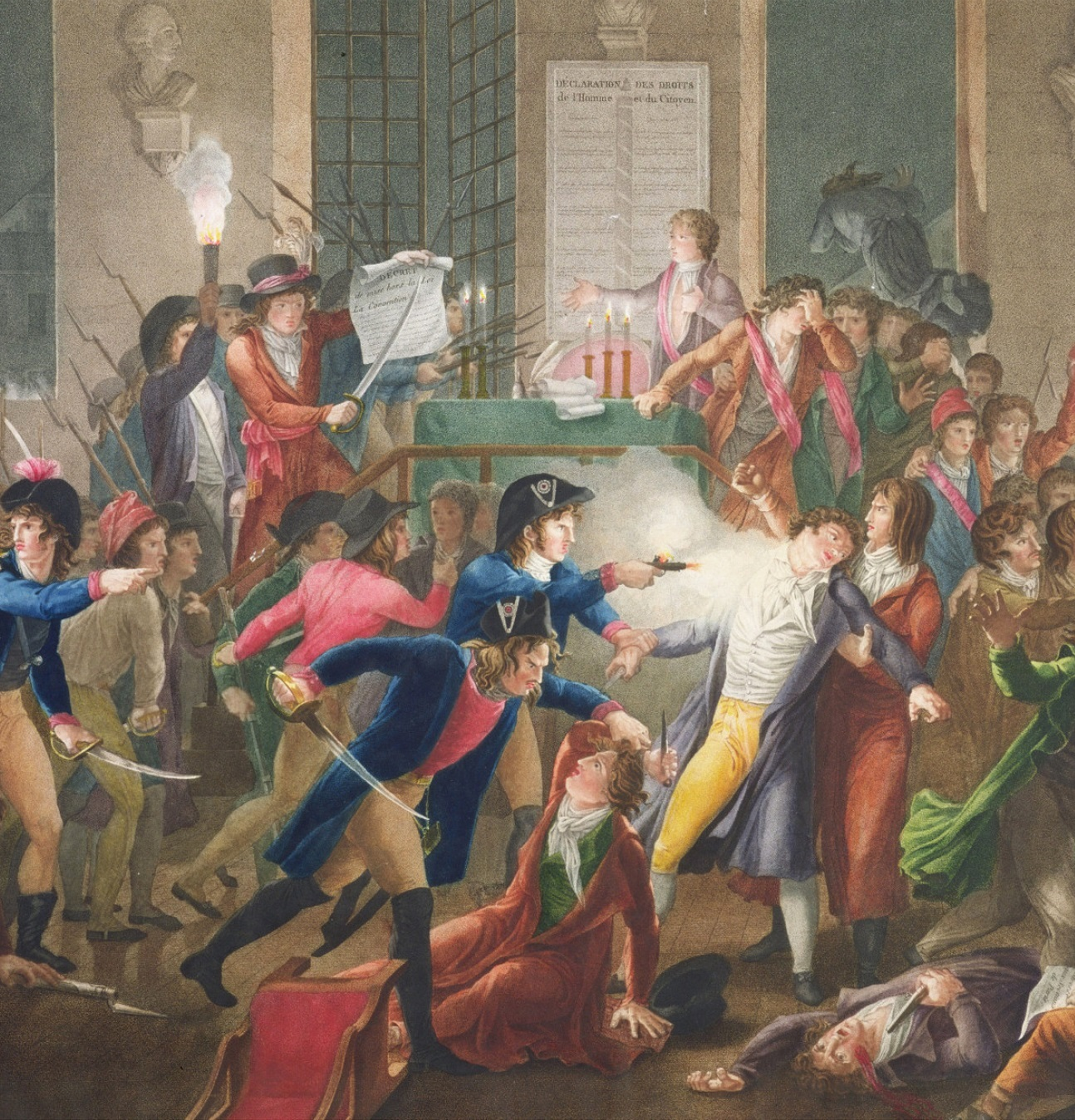
Painting by Jean-Joseph-François Tassaert of Charles-André Méda shooting Robespierre

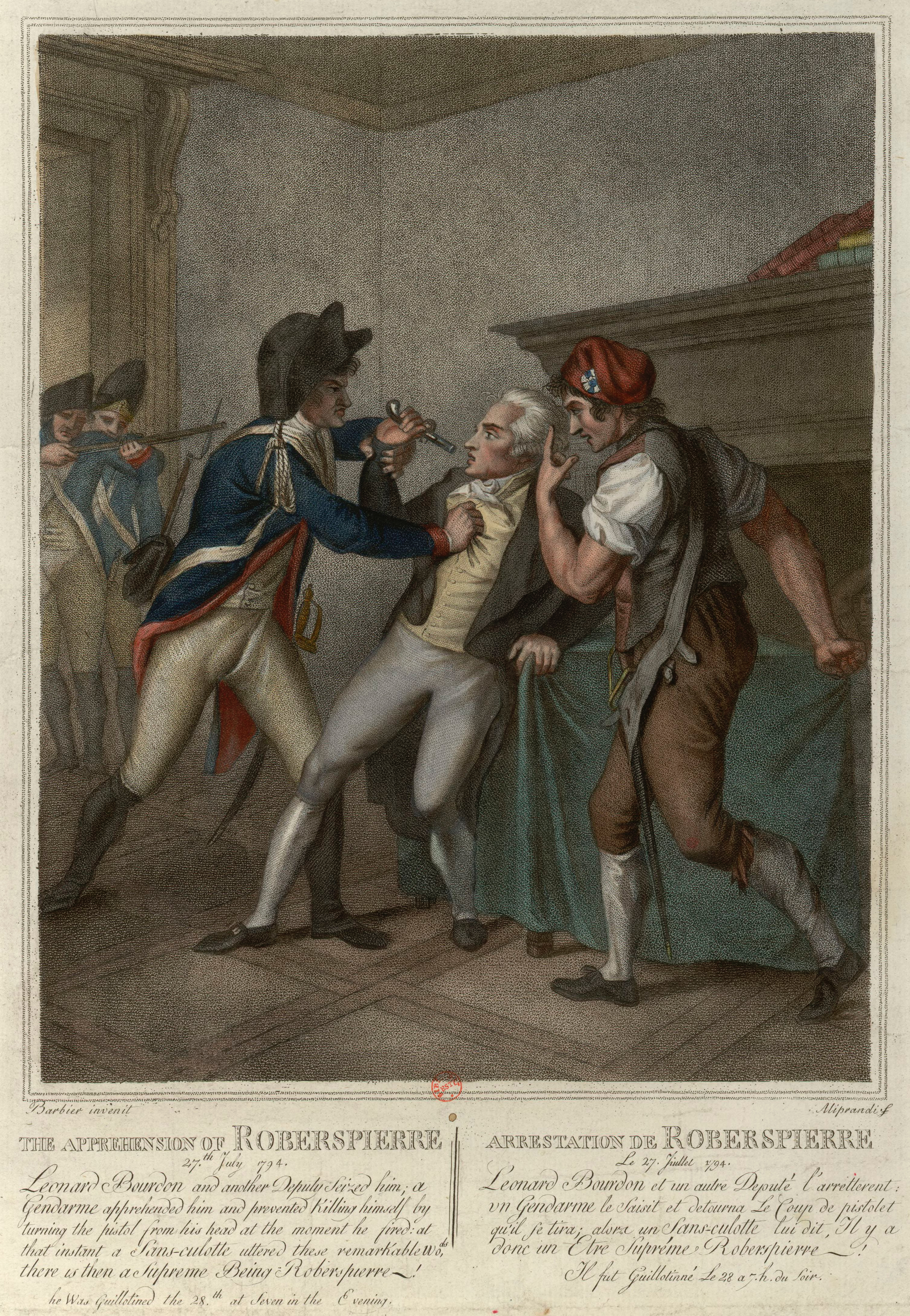
Apprehension of Robespierre, who on being seized by a Gendarme fired a pistol into his mouth, but did not wound himself mortally.

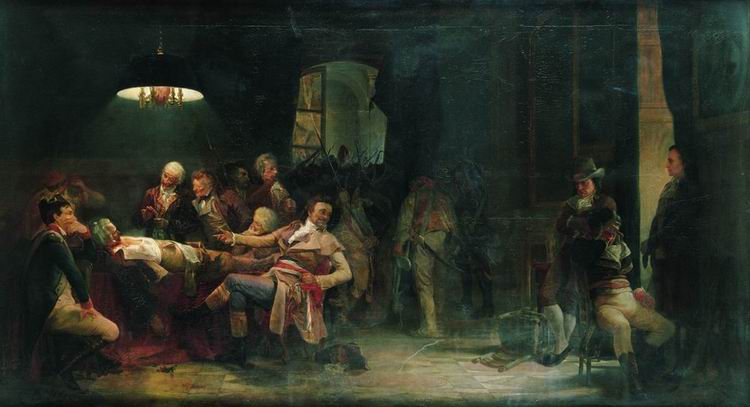
Valery Jacobi's painting showing the wounded Robespierre

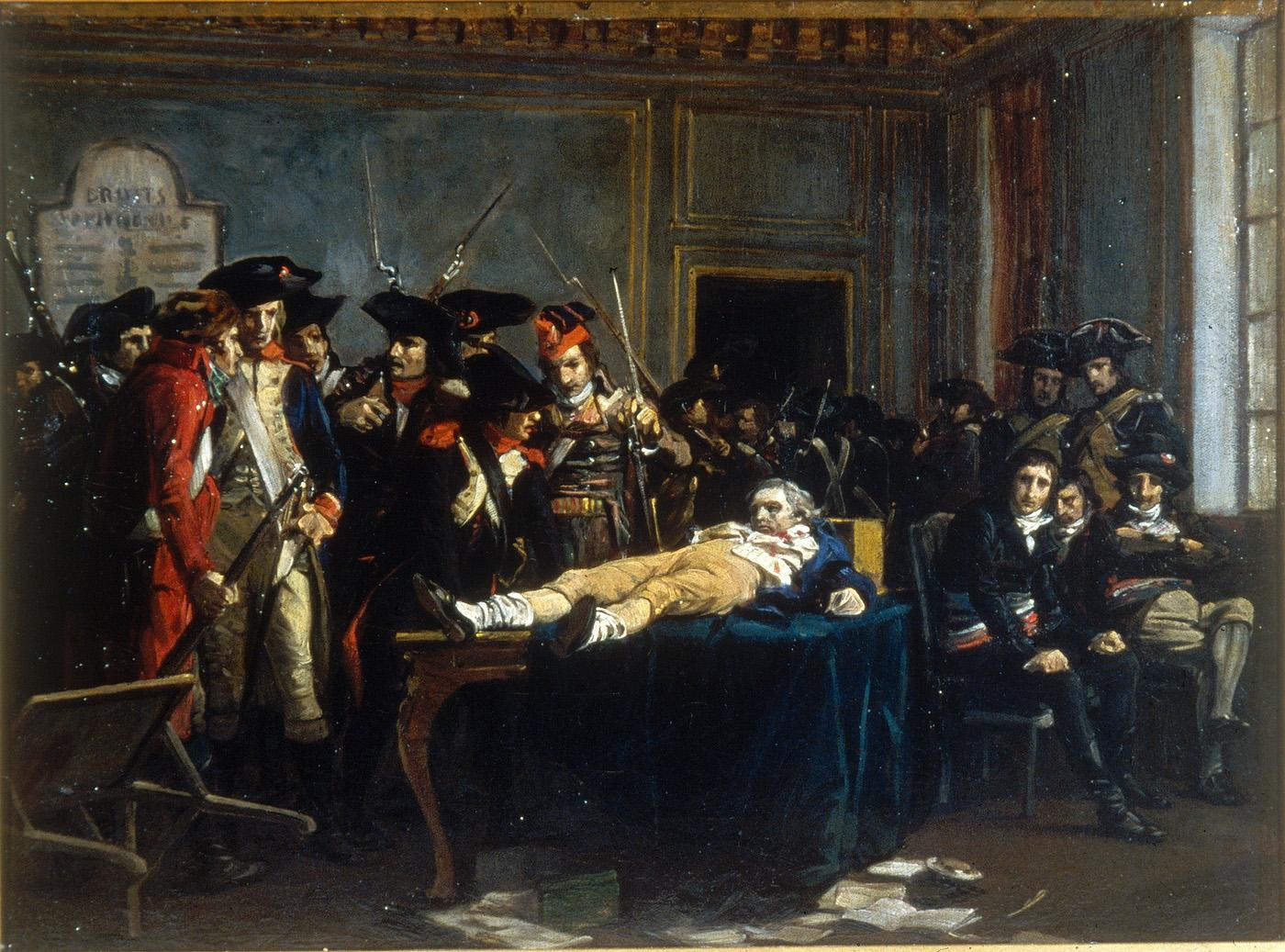
Lying on a table Robespierre is the object of the curiosity and quips of Thermidorians, painting by Lucien-Étienne Mélingue (Salon de 1877; in the Musée de la Révolution française)

=== Execution ===
Robespierre spent the remainder of the night at the antechamber of the Committee of General Security. He lay on the table, his head on a pine box, his shirt stained with blood. By 5 a.m., his brother and Couthon were transported to the nearest hospital, the Hôtel-Dieu de Paris. However, Barras prohibited Robespierre from being taken there. At ten in the morning, a military doctor was summoned and extracted some of his teeth and fragments of his broken jaw. Subsequently, Robespierre was confined to a cell in the Conciergerie. On 28 July 1794, the Revolutionary Tribunal assembled around noon. By 2 p.m., Robespierre and twenty-one "Robespierrists" faced accusations of counter-revolution and were sentenced to death under the provisions of the law of 22 Prairial, although without even a cursory hearing. At approximately 6 p.m., the condemned were conveyed in three carts to the Place de la Révolution for execution, alongside Nicolas François Vivier, the final president of the Jacobins, and Antoine Simon, the cobbler who served as the jailer of the Dauphin. A furious mob, hurling curses, accompanied the grim procession.

A contemporary Thermidorian print identifies Robespierre as number 10 in the procession to the scaffold. During the preparation for his execution, the executioner, Charles-Henri Sanson, dislodged the bandage securing his shattered jaw, eliciting an anguished scream until his demise. Following his beheading, the crowd erupted in applause and jubilant cries, which reportedly endured for fifteen minutes. Robespierre and his associates were interred in a mass grave at the newly established Errancis Cemetery. (Note: (in French) Landrucimetieres.fr. A plaque indicating the former site of this cemetery is located at 97 rue de Monceau, Paris.) Between 1844 and 1859 (likely in 1848), the remains of all those buried there were transferred to the Catacombs of Paris.

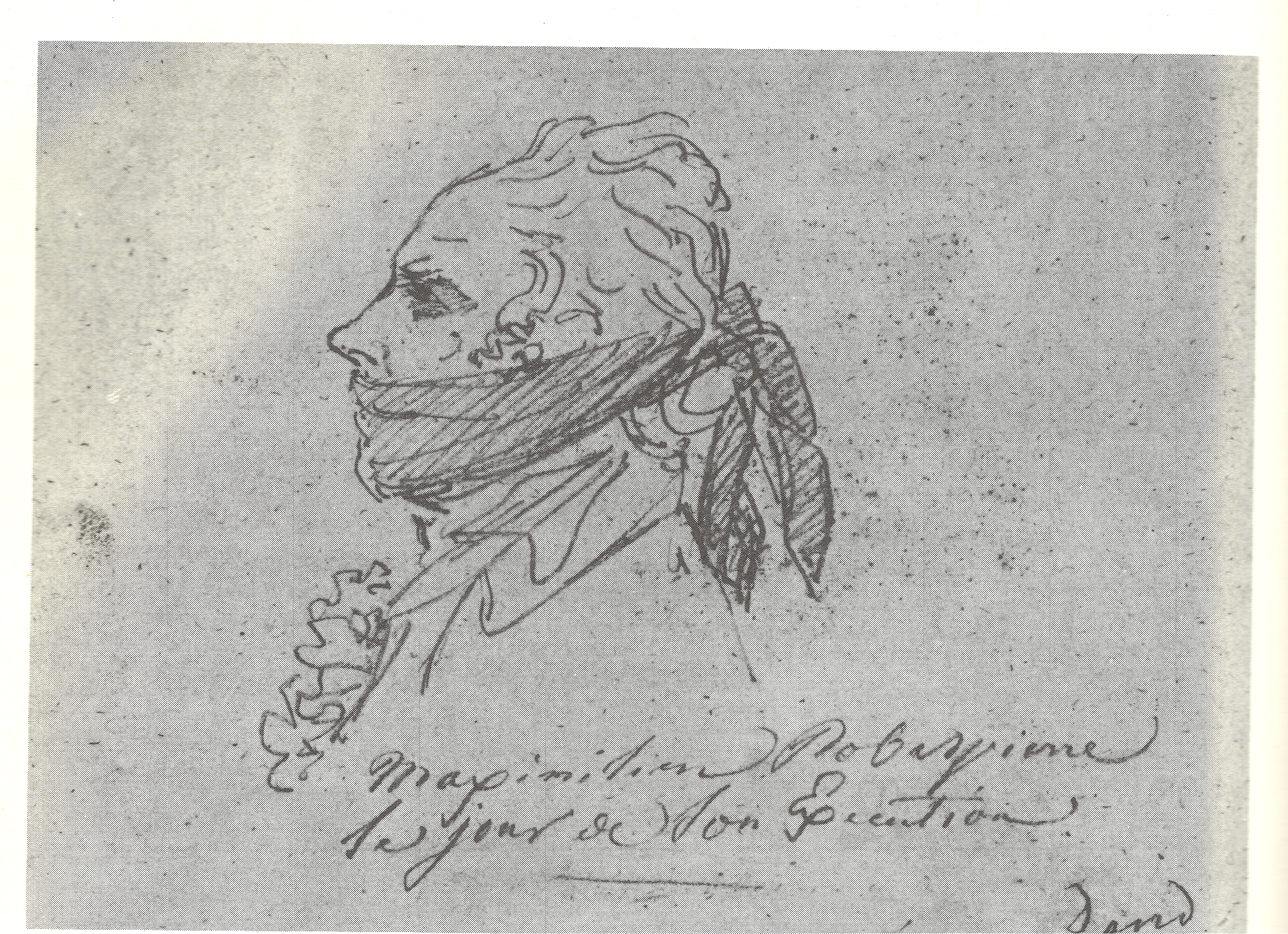
Robespierre on the day of his execution; sketch attributed to Jacques Louis David

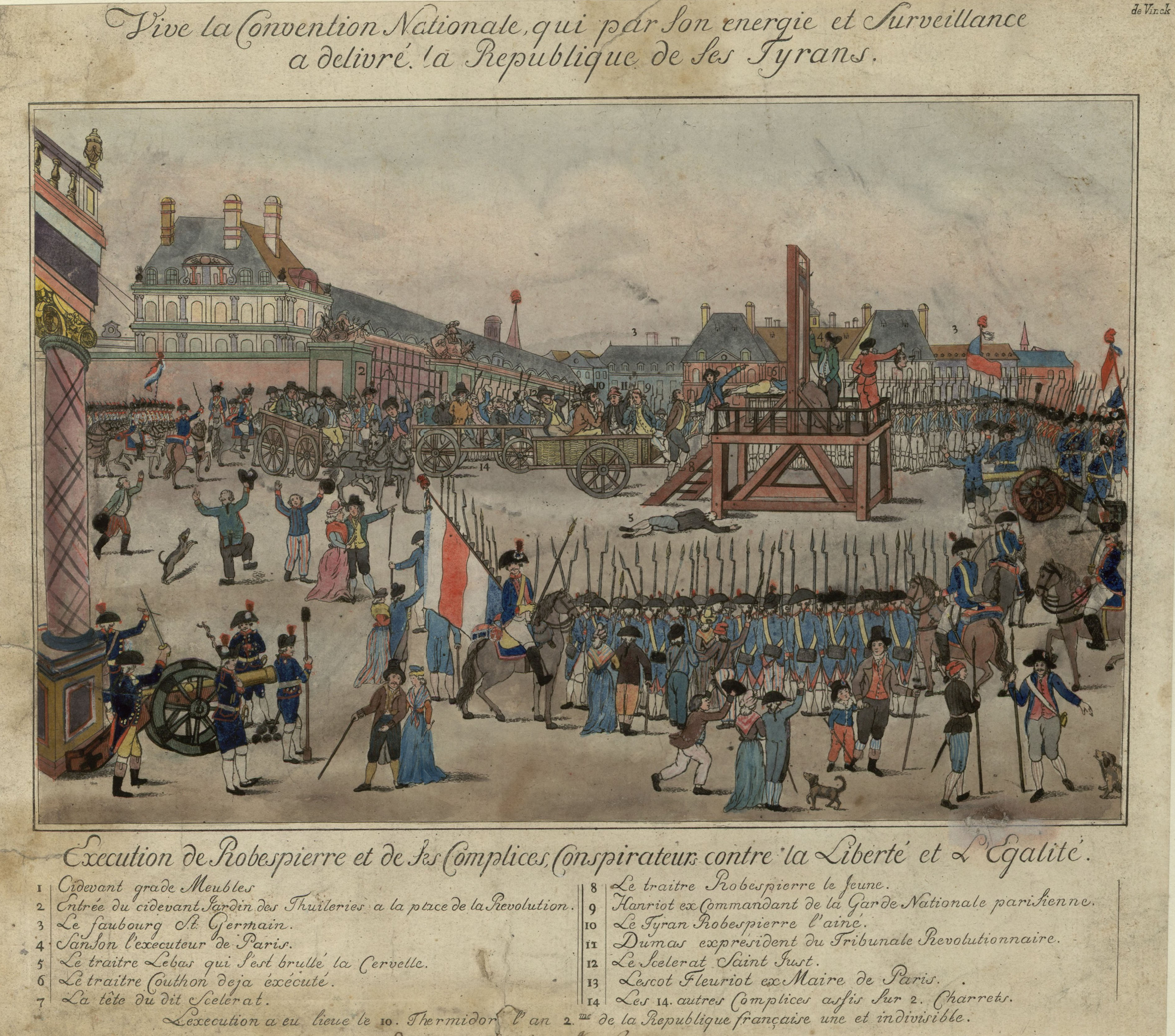
The execution of Couthon; the body of Le Bas (#5) is shown lying on the ground (although he had committed suicide elsewhere); Robespierre (#10) is shown holding a handkerchief to his mouth. Hanriot (#9) is covering his eye.

== Legacy and memory ==
Robespierre is best known for his role as a member of the Committee of Public Safety. (Note: He signed 542 arrests, especially in 1794. Most of the arrests came from Bertrand Barère, Lazare Carnot and Pierre Louis Prieur.) He exerted his influence to suppress the republican Girondins to the right, the radical Hébertists to the left and the indulgent Dantonists in the centre. Though nominally all members of the committee were equally responsible, the Thermidorians held Robespierre as the most culpable for the bloodshed. For Carnot: "this monster was above all a hypocrite; it is because he knew how to seduce the people".

In mid-August, Courtois was appointed by the Convention to collect evidence against Robespierre, Le Bas and Saint-Just, whose report has a poor reputation, selecting and destroying papers. At the end of the month, Tallien stated that all that the country had just been through was the "Terror" and that the "monster" Robespierre, the "king" of the Revolution, was the orchestrator. According to Charles Barbaroux, who visited him early August 1792, his pretty boudoir was full of images of himself in every form and art; a painting, a drawing, a bust, a relief and six physiognotraces on the tables. The eyewitness Helen Maria Williams attributed all the grim events to his hypocrisy and cunning. She described him as the great conspirator against the liberty of France. For Samuel Coleridge, one of the authors of The Fall of Robespierre, he was worse than Oliver Cromwell. For Madame de Staël: "Robespierre acquired the reputation of high democratic virtue and so was believed to be incapable of personal views. As soon as he was suspected of having them, his power was at an end." Vanity was Robespierre's ruling passion according to Sir Walter Scott.

In fact, a whole new political mythology was being created. On 23 Thermidor, Coleridge started to write the first act of The Fall of Robespierre. Vilate, who exaggerated the numbers, raged against keeping 300,000 people in prison and trying to execute two or three hundred people every day. To preach the ideals of '93 after Thermidor was to expose oneself to suspicions of Robespierrism, suspicions which had to be avoided above all others. Two contrasting legends around Robespierre developed: a critical one that held Robespierre as an irresponsible, self-serving figure whose ambitions generated widespread calamity, and a supportive one that held him as an early friend of the proletariat, about to embark on economic revolution when he fell.

Robespierre's reputation has undergone several cycles of reappraisal. His name reached peaks of public interest in the mid-nineteenth century, particularly under the Second French Republic, and again between 1880 and 1910, and around 1940. During the 1830s and 1840s, Christian socialists such as Philippe Buchez portrayed him as a moral prophet and a messianic figure of civic virtue, the sacrificial redeemer of the Revolution. By contrast, Jules Michelet saw him as the "priest Robespierre", and Alphonse Aulard denounced him as a "bigot monomaniac" and "mystic assassin". To Mary Duclaux, he remained "the apostle of Unity".

Robespierre did not thunder like Danton or scream like Marat. But his clear, shrill voice enunciated calmly syllables that the ears of his listeners retained forever. And it is owned that, in this as in other things, Robespierre had a strange provision of the future; as a thinker at least, as a seer, he made few mistakes.

His reputation peaked in the 1920s, during the Third French Republic, when the influential French historian Albert Mathiez rejected the common view of Robespierre as demagogic, dictatorial, and fanatical. Mathiez argued he was an eloquent spokesman for the poor and oppressed, an enemy of royalist intrigues, a vigilant adversary of dishonest and corrupt politicians, a guardian of the French First Republic, an intrepid leader of the French Revolutionary government, and a prophet of a socially responsible state. Lenin referred to Robespierre as a "Bolshevik avant la lettre" (before the term was coined) and erected the Robespierre Monument to him in 1918. In the Soviet Union, he was used as an example of a revolutionary figure. However the Marxist approach that portrayed Robespierre as a hero has largely faded away.

In 1941, Marc Bloch, a French historian, sighed disillusioned (a year before he decided to join the French Resistance): "Robespierrists, anti-robespierrists ... for pity's sake, just tell us who was Robespierre?" According to R. R. Palmer: the easiest way to justify Robespierre is to represent the other Revolutionists in an unfavourable or disgraceful light. This was the method used by Robespierre himself. Soboul argues that Robespierre and Saint-Just "were too preoccupied in defeating the interest of the bourgeoisie to give their total support to the sans-culottes, and yet too attentive to the needs of the sans-culottes to get support from the middle class". For Peter McPhee, Robespierre's achievements were monumental, but so was the tragedy of his final weeks of indecision. The members of the committee, together with members of the Committee of General Security, were as much responsible for the running of the Terror as Robespierre. They may have exaggerated his role to downplay their own contribution, and used him as a scapegoat after his death. Jean-Clément Martin and McPhee interpret the repression of the revolutionary government as a response to anarchy and popular violence, and not as the assertion of a precise ideology. Martin holds Tallien responsible for Robespierre's bad reputation, and that the "Thermidorians" invented the "Terror" as there is no law that proves its introduction.

Robespierre's reputation has remained the subject of sharp historiographical debate. In his survey of French historians, François Crouzet traced changing interpretations from predominantly critical liberal accounts in the nineteenth century to the more favourable assessments associated with socialist and Marxist historians in the twentieth century. More recently, Marcel Gauchet has argued that Robespierre's political thought rested on an idealised conception of a virtuous people: by seeking to place this virtue at the centre of political power, he opened, in Gauchet's interpretation, the possibility of potentially unlimited repression against those perceived to deviate from it.

Robespierre's contested legacy also became evident in May 2011, when Sotheby's offered for sale a collection of manuscripts preserved by the family of Philippe Le Bas. The collection included speeches, drafts of newspaper articles and reports intended for the Convention, a fragment of Robespierre's speech of 8 Thermidor, and a letter concerning virtue and happiness. The proposed sale prompted a campaign among historians, archivists and politicians to keep the papers in a French public collection. The Société des études robespierristes launched a public subscription, while the French Communist Party, the Socialist Party and the Radical Party of the Left alerted the French Ministry of Culture to the possibility that the manuscripts might be sold abroad. At the auction on 18 May, the French state exercised its right of pre-emption on behalf of the Archives de France, and the manuscripts subsequently entered the Archives nationales.

Many historians neglected Robespierre's attitude towards the French National Guard from July 1789, and as "public accuser", responsible for the officers within the police till April 1792. He then began promoting civilian armament and the creation of a revolutionary army of 23,000 men in his periodical. (Note: In those days an issue as the 2nd United States Congress enacted Militia Acts of 1792 for the organisation of state militias and the conscription of every "free able-bodied white male citizen" between the ages of 18 and 45.) He defended the right of revolution and promoted a revolutionary armed force. Dubois-Crancé described Robespierre as the general of the Sans-culottes. The revisionist historian Furet thought that Terror was inherent in the ideology of the French Revolution and was not just a violent episode. Equally important is his conclusion that revolutionary violence is connected with extreme voluntarism. Furet was especially critical of the "Marxist line" of Albert Soboul.

Indeed, he failed in his opposition to two decisions which resulted in the greatest bloodshed and dissension during the Revolution: the declaration of war on the European monarchies and the dechristianization movement. Regarding the former, Robespierre feared that initiating a war of liberation would consolidate and intensify European opposition to the Revolution and risk a possible defeat. He argued against Brissot that, even if victorious, the invading French troops would be welcomed as liberators. Further, he presciently argued that war would create the groundwork for a military dictatorship, as indeed it ultimately did. Regarding dechristianization, he saw it as a gratuitous affront to the genuine religious needs of the people, especially outside Paris, and would only drive them into the arms of the refractory clergy, which is exactly what happened with disastrous results in the Vendée.

Historians in support of Robespierre have been at pains to try to prove that he was not the dictator of France in the year II. McPhee stated that on several previous occasions, Robespierre had admitted that he was worn out; his personal and tactical judgement, once so acute, seem to have deserted him.

Robespierre fell ill many times: in the spring of 1790, in November 1792 (more than three weeks); in September–October 1793 (two weeks); in February/March 1794 (more than a month); in April/May (about three weeks) and in June/July (more than three weeks). These illnesses not only explain Robespierre's repeated absences from committees and from the Convention during important periods, especially in 1794 when the Great Terror occurred but also the fact that his faculty of judgment deteriorated – as did his moods.

The assassination attempts made him suspicious to the point of obsession. There is a long line of historians "who blame Robespierre for all the less attractive episodes of the Revolution." Robespierre was not part of the celebrations of the bicentenary of the revolution. Jonathan Israel is sharply critical of Robespierre for repudiating what Israel views as the true values of the radical Enlightenment. He argues, "Jacobin ideology and culture under Robespierre was an obsessive Rousseauiste moral Puritanism steeped in authoritarianism, anti-intellectualism, and xenophobia, and it repudiated free expression, basic human rights, and democracy." He refers to the Girondin deputies Thomas Paine, Condorcet, Daunou, Cloots, Destutt and Abbé Gregoire denouncing Robespierre's ruthlessness, hypocrisy, dishonesty, lust for power, and intellectual mediocrity. According to Jeremy Popkin, he was undone by his obsession with the vision of an ideal republic. Zhu Xueqin became famous for his 1994 book titled The Demise of the Republic of Virtue: From Rousseau to Robespierre. For Aldous Huxley, "Robespierre achieved the most superficial kind of revolution, the political." Georges Lefebvre believed Robespierre to be a "staunch defender of democracy, a determined opponent of foreign war, saviour of the Republic and man of integrity and vision. Robespierre remains as controversial as ever, two centuries after his death."

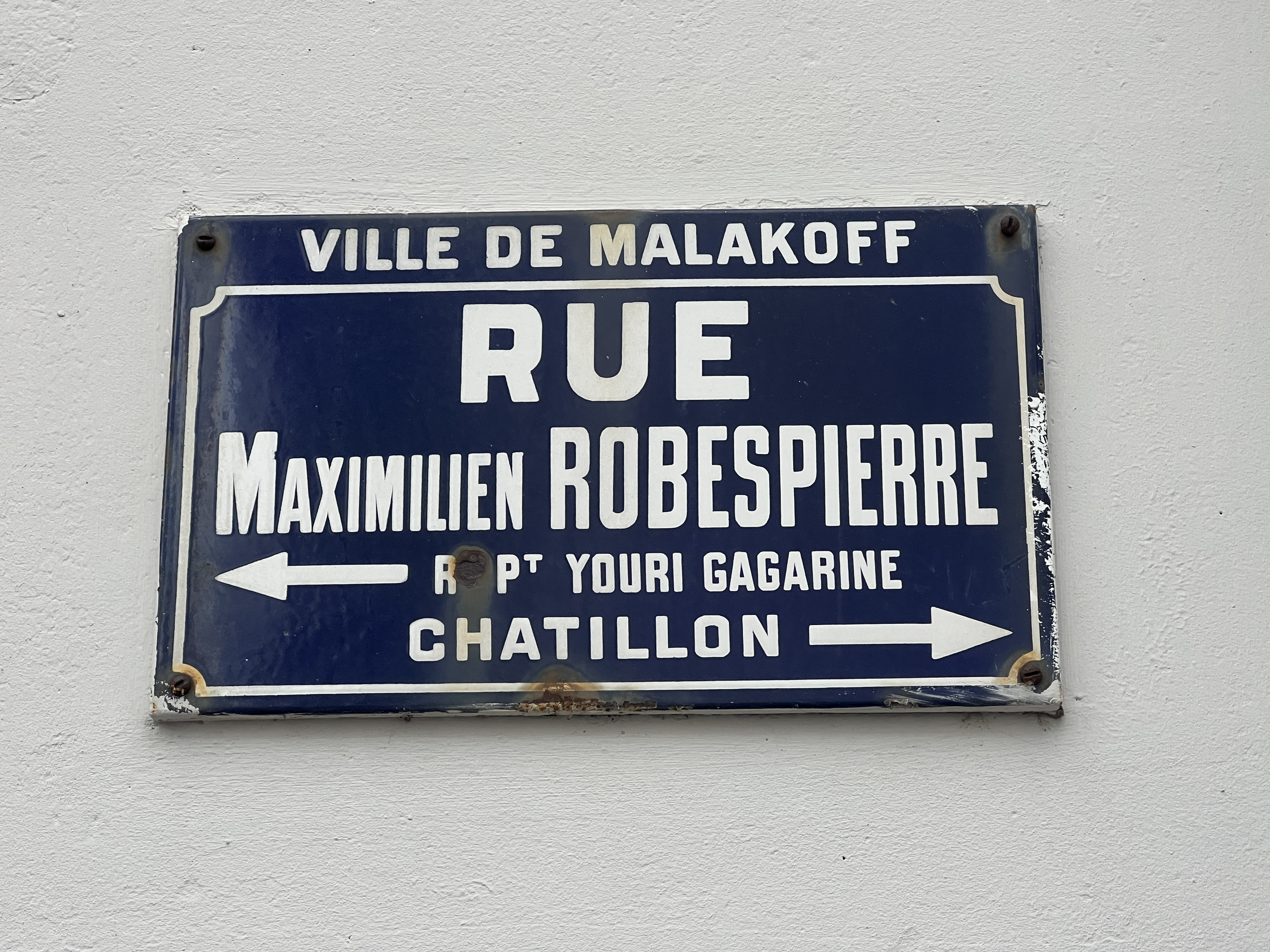
Maximilien-Robespierre Street in Malakoff, Hauts-de-Seine, France

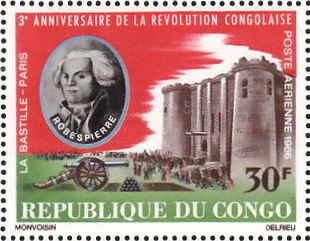
Robespierre on a stamp of the Republic of the Congo

== Portrayals ==
Over 300 actors have portrayed Robespierre, in both French and English. Prominent examples include:

- Sidney Herbert in Orphans of the Storm (1921)
- Werner Krauss in Danton (1921)
- Edmond Van Daële in Napoléon (1927)
- George Hackathorne in Captain of the Guard (1930)
- Ernest Milton in The Scarlet Pimpernel (1934)
- Henry Oscar in The Return of the Scarlet Pimpernel (1937)
- Leonard Penn in Marie Antoinette (1938)
- Richard Basehart in Reign of Terror (1949)
- Keith Anderson in the Doctor Who episode, The Reign of Terror (1964)
- Peter Gilmore as a character referred to only as "Citizen Robespierre" in Don't Lose Your Head, a Carry On spoof of The Scarlet Pimpernel (1967)
- Christopher Ellison in Lady Oscar (1979)
- Richard Morant in The Scarlet Pimpernel (1982)
- Wojciech Pszoniak in Danton (1983)
- Andrzej Seweryn in La Révolution française (1989)
- Ronan Vibert in The Scarlet Pimpernel (1999–2000)
- Simon Harvey in Chucklevision (2005)
- Guillaume Aretos in Mr. Peabody & Sherman (2014)
- Nicolas Vaude in The Visitors: Bastille Day (2016)
- Louis Garrel in One Nation, One King (2018)
- Sam Troughton in Napoleon (2023)
- Jonathan Slinger in The Sandman (2025)

== Bibliography ==
- 1785 – Discours couronné par la Société royale des arts et des sciences de Metz, sur les questions suivantes, proposeés pour sujet du prix de l'année 1784
- 1791 – Adresse de Maximilien Robespierre aux Français
- 1792–1793 – Lettres de Maximilien Robespierre, membre de la Convention nationale de France, à ses commettans
- 1794 – Lettre de Robespierre, au général Pichegru. Paris le 3 Thermidor, (21 Juillet) l'an 2 de la République Françoise = Brief van Robespierre, aan den generaal Pichegru. Parys, den 3 Thermidor, (21 July) het 2de jaar der Fransche Republiek
- 1828 – Papiers inédits trouvés chez Robespierre, Saint–Just, Payan ...: supprimés ou omis par Courtois: précédés du Rapport de ce député à la Convention Nationale. Tome premier; Tome second; Tome troisième
- 1830 – Mémoires authentiques de Maximilien de Robespierre, ornés de son portrait, et de facsimile de son écriture extraits de ses mémoirs. Tome premier; Tome deuxième
- 1912–2022 – Œuvres complètes de Maximilien Robespierre, 10 volumes, Société des études robespierristes, 1912–1967. Réimpression Société des études robespierristes, Phénix Éditions, 2000, 10 volumes. Réédition avec une nouvelle introduction de Claude Mazauric, Édition du Centenaire de la Société des études robespierristes, Éditions du Miraval, Enghien-les-Bains, 2007, 10 volumes et 1 volume de Compléments. Un onzième volume, paru en 2007, regroupe les textes omis lors de l'édition initiale.

== Sources ==
- Andress, David (2006). The Terror: The Merciless War for Freedom in Revolutionary France. Farrar, Straus, & Giroux. ISBN 978-0-374-27341-5.
- Bean, Jennifer M.; Horak, Laura; Kapse, Anupama (2014). Silent Cinema and the Politics of Space. Indiana University Press. ISBN 978-0-253-01507-5.
- Bell, David (2007). The First Total War: Napoleon's Europe and the Birth of Warfare as We Know It. Houghton Mifflin Harcourt. ISBN 978-0-618-34965-4.
- Bienvenu, Richard T. (1968). The Ninth of Thermidor: The Fall of Robespierre. Oxford University Press. ISBN 978-0-19-680619-8.
- Carr, J. L. (1972). Robespierre: The Force of Circumstance. St. Martin's. ISBN 978-0-09-457850-0.
- Davidson, Ian (2016). The French Revolution: From Enlightenment to Tyranny. Profile. ISBN 978-1-84765-936-1.
- Doyle, William (2002). The Oxford History of the French Revolution. Oxford University Press. ISBN 978-0-19-160829-2.
- Dunn, Susan (2000). Sister Revolutions: French Lightning, American Light. Macmillan. ISBN 978-0-571-19989-1.
- Dunoyer, Alphonse (1913). The public prosecutor of the terror, Antoine Quentin Fouquier-Tinville; tr. from the French of Alphonse Dunoyer by A. W. Evans. With a photogravure frontispiece and fourteen other illustrations. New York, G. P. Putnam's Sons. ISBN 978-1-372-85663-1
- Furet, François (1989). Interpreting the French Revolution. Harvard University Press. ISBN 978-0-521-28049-5.
- Furet, François; Ozouf, Mona (1989). A Critical Dictionary of the French Revolution. Harvard University Press. ISBN 978-0-674-17728-4.
- Furet, François (1996). The French Revolution, 1770–1814. Blackwell. ISBN 0-631-20299-4.
- Hampson, Norman (1974). The Life and Opinions of Maximilien Robespierre. Duckworth. ISBN 978-0-7156-0741-1.
- Hardman, John (1999). Robespierre: Profiles in power. Pearson. ISBN 978-0-582-43755-5.
- Haydon, Colin; Doyle, William (2006). Robespierre. Cambridge University Press. ISBN 978-0-521-02605-5. A collection of essays covering not only Robespierre's thoughts and deeds, but also the way he has been portrayed by historians and fictional writers alike.
  - "Reviewed". Archived from the original on 9 June 2007. by Hilary Mantel in the London Review of Books, Vol. 22, No. 7, p. 30 March 2000.
- Hazan, Eric (2017) [2014]. A People's History of the French Revolution. Verso. ISBN 978-1-78168-984-4.
- Ishay, Micheline (1995). Internationalism and Its Betrayal. University of Minnesota Press. ISBN 978-0-8166-2470-6.
- Israel, Jonathan (2014). Revolutionary Ideas: An Intellectual History of the French Revolution from The Rights of Man to Robespierre. Princeton University Press. ISBN 978-1-4008-4999-4.
- Jenkins, Cecil (2011). A Brief History of France. Running. ISBN 978-0-7624-4120-4.
- Jordan, David P. (2013). Revolutionary Career of Maximilien Robespierre. Simon & Schuster. ISBN 978-1-4767-2571-0.
- Kennedy, Michael L. (1988). The Jacobin clubs in the French Revolution: the Middle Years. Princeton University Press. ISBN 978-0-691-05526-8.
- Laurent, Gustave (1939). Oeuvres Completes de Robespierre (in French). Imprimerie de G. Thomas. OCLC 459859442.
- Lewes, George Henry (1849). The Life of Maximilien Robspierre; with Extracts from his Unpublished Correspondence. Philadelphia: Carey and Hart Publishers. ISBN 978-1-4021-7272-4
- Linton, Marisa (2013). Choosing Terror: Virtue, Friendship, and Authenticity in the French Revolution. Oxford University Press. ISBN 978-0-19-957630-2.
- Martin, Jean-Clément (2006). Violence et Révolution: essai sur la naissance d'un mythe national. L'univers historique (in French). Seuil. ISBN 2-02-043842-9.,
- Mathiez, Albert (1920). Un procès de corruption sous la terreur: l'affaire de la Compagnie des Indes (in French). F. Alcan.
- Mathiez, Albert (1927). The French Revolution. Williams & Norgate.
- Matrat, Jean (1975). Robespierre: or, The tyranny of the majority. Scribner. ISBN 978-0-684-14055-1.
- McPhee, Peter (2012). Robespierre: A Revolutionary Life. Yale University Press. ISBN 978-0-300-11811-7.
- McPhee, Peter (2015). The Robespierre Problem: An Introduction (PDF). H-France Salon.
- Michelet, Jules (1848). Historical View of the French Revolution. Translated by Cocks, Charles. London: H.G. Bohn, York Street, Covent Garden. ISBN 978-0-9994283-1-3
- Mignet, François (1826). History of the French Revolution from 1789 to 1814: Vol. I. London: Hunt and Clarke, Tavistock Street, Covent Garden. ISBN 978-0-554-12432-2
- Moore, Lucy (2007). Liberty: The Lives and Times of Six Women in Revolutionary France. HarperCollins. ISBN 978-0-06-082526-3.
- Pfeiffer, Laura Belle (1913). The Uprising of June 20, 1792. University of Nebraska.
- Robespierre, Charlotte de (2006) [1834]. Mémoires (in French). Preface by Jean-Clément Martin, introduction by Albert Laponneraye. Nouveau Monde Éditions.
- Robespierre, Maximilien de (1958). Textes choisis (in French). Vol. III: Novembre 1793 – Juillet 1794. Introduction et notes explicatives par Jean Poperen. Éditions sociales.
- Rudé, George F. E. (1975). Robespierre: portrait of a Revolutionary Democrat. Collins. ISBN 978-0-00-216708-6. A political portrait of Robespierre, examining his changing image among historians and the different aspects of Robespierre as an 'ideologue', as a political democrat, as a social democrat, as a practitioner of revolution, as a politician and as a popular leader/leader of revolution.
- Sanson, Henri (1876). Memoirs of the Sansons: From Private Notes and Documents (1688–1847). Chatto and Windus. OCLC 317736774
- Schama, Simon (1989). Citizens: A Chronicle of the French Revolution. Alfred A. Knopf. ISBN 978-0-394-55948-3.
- Scurr, Ruth (2006). Fatal Purity: Robespierre and the French Revolution. Macmillan. ISBN 978-0-8050-8261-6.
- Serna, Pierre (2005). La République des girouettes: 1789–1815... et au-delà: une anomalie politique, la France de l'extrême centre (in French). Éditions Champ Vallon. ISBN 978-2-87673-413-5.
- Soboul, Albert (1974). The French Revolution, 1787–1799: from the storming of the Bastille to Napoleon. Vintage. ISBN 978-0-394-71220-8.
- Thompson, J. M. (1988). Robespierre. B. Blackwell. ISBN 978-0-631-15504-1.
- Popkin, Jeremy D. (2010). You Are All Free: The Haitian Revolution and the Abolition of Slavery. Cambridge University Press. ISBN 978-0-521-51722-5.
- Soboul, Albert (2005). Dictionnaire historique de la Révolution française (in French). Quadrige / PUF. ISBN 978-2130536055.
