= Shildon =

Town and civil parish in County Durham, England

Coordinates: 54.63°N 1.65°W

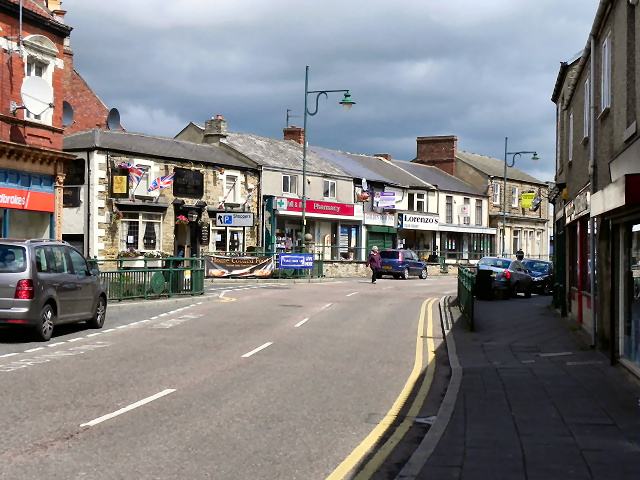
- Church Street

- Location within County Durham
- Population: 9,976 (2011 Census)
- OS grid reference: NZ226263
  - London: 225 mi (362 km)
- Civil parish: Shildon
- Unitary authority: County Durham
- Ceremonial county: County Durham
- Region: North East
- Country: England
- Sovereign state: United Kingdom
- Post town: SHILDON
- Postcode district: DL4
- Dialling code: 01388
- Police: Durham
- Fire: County Durham and Darlington
- Ambulance: North East
- UK Parliament: Bishop Auckland
- Website: https://shildon.gov.uk

Listed Building – Grade II*
- Official name: Soho House
- Designated: 24 February 1986
- Reference no.: 1160335
- Raised to Grade II*: 11 May 2021

Listed Building – Grade II*
- Official name: Soho Engine Shed, originally Kilburns' warehouse
- Designated: 24 February 1986
- Reference no.: 1310628
- Raised to Grade II*: 11 May 2021

Listed Building – Grade II*
- Official name: Locomotive coaling drops
- Designated: 24 February 1986
- Reference no.: 1160320
- Raised to Grade II*: 11 May 2021

Shildon is a town and civil parish in County Durham, in England. The population taken at the 2011 Census was 9,976. The town has the Locomotion Museum, due to it having the first station, built in 1825, and locomotive works on the Stockton and Darlington Railway.

== History ==
The name Shildon comes from the Old English word sceld, This translates as 'shelf shaped hill' or 'shield/refuge'. Another possibility is the Old English word scylfe meaning 'shelf' and the suffix dun meaning 'hill'. This refers to the town's location on a limestone escarpment.

The earliest inhabitants of the area were most likely present from the Mesolithic period some 6,000 years ago. Although no evidence of settlement has been found in Shildon itself a small flint tool discovered in the nearby Brusselton area may be from this period.

Roman expansion reached County Durham in the first century AD. Possible evidence of Roman infrastructure has been uncovered in the area such as Hagg's Lane which passes through Brusselton Wood. Hagg's Lane formed part of the Roman road known as Dere Street.

The first recorded reference to Shildon came during the Anglo-Saxon period in 821 AD when lands were granted to the church.

=== Salvation Army ===
The founder of the Salvation Army, William Booth, visited the town as part of a 'motor-car campaign'. The advertised schedule had him visiting the town on the morning of 1 September 1911.

=== Second World War ===
In March 1940, Leading Stoker C. Anderson of Shildon was awarded the Distinguished Service Medal for 'displaying good leadership' while serving in the submarine HMS Ursula.

The Minister of Economic Warfare, Hugh Dalton, visited Shildon in 1942. He spoke in the town regarding the need to work harder and consume less.

== Railway heritage ==
=== 19th century ===
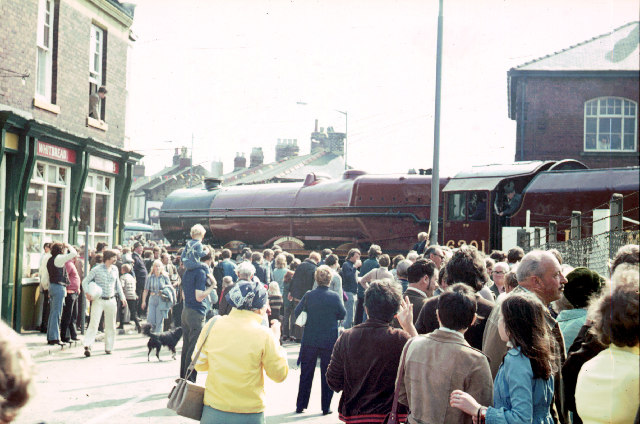
New Shildon: celebrating 150 years of railway history in 1975

At the dawn of the 19th century Shildon was a few houses on a crossroad. The Industrial Revolution and the coming of the railways saw the town grow. In 1801 the population was recorded at being 100 people. Their occupations were noted as being in agriculture, coal mining and the growing textiles industry.

In 1818 notice was given in the London Gazette '...that application is intended to be made to Parliament in the next session, for an Act for making and maintaining a 'rail-way or tram-road from the River Tees, at or near Stockton, in the county of Durham', with Shildon listed as one of the towns on the planned route.

John Dixon, assistant to George Stephenson recalled the town before the railways came.

I have known Shildon for fifty years when there was not a house of any sort at New Shildon, much less a Mechanics Institute. When I surveyed the lines of the projected railway in 1821, the site of this New Shildon Works was a wet, swampy field – a likely place to find a snipe, or a flock of peewits. Dan Adamson's was the nearest house. A part of Old Shildon existed, but 'Chapel Row', a row of miner's houses, was unbuilt or unthought of.

— John Dixon, Bishop Auckland Herald, 3 September 1863

The volume of coal being produced by coal mining outstripped the capacity of the traditional method of transporting coal, on horse-drawn wagon ways. Steam power was introduced through the use of static steam engines. These were, in turn, were superseded by steam locomotives. Coal would be pulled by static engines over Brusselton Incline into Shildon where the wagons would be attached to a locomotive.

The population grew with this industrial expansion, the population rising from 115 in 1821, to 2,631 in 1841 up to 11,759 by the end of the century. Records show in 1851 the town had 447 houses that were inhabited and 26 uninhabited. Two years later the value of property in the town was assessed at £11,269 and 10 Shillings.

Demand led to a passenger service beginning from the town on 27 September 1825. The first train, Locomotion No.1 began its journey outside the Mason's Arms Public house. There is an argument that the Mason's Arms could be classified as the world's first railway station. In the early stages of the Stockton and Darlington Railway, tickets were sold at the bar. Between 1833 and 1841 the company hired a room in the pub for use as a booking office.

The railway ran from its northern terminus at Shildon along 27 miles of track to its terminus at Stockton. In 1838 the speed of travel was noted by The Derby Mercury which reported that a servant asked permission to travel to Shildon from Stockton on Christmas Day. She made her request "a little before four in the afternoon" and was able to return home "by seven o'clock the same evening".

Recruited to the railway by George Stephenson in 1824, Timothy Hackworth went on to become superintendent in 1825. He was charged with building locomotives for the company.

==== Engine works ====
Timothy Hackworth moved into Hackworth House (formerly Soho House, now Grade II* listed) with his family in 1831. There he supervised the construction of what became the Soho Engine Works close to the property. In 1833 Hackworth renegotiated his contract with the Stockton and Darlington Railway to take over the works himself. This became the Soho Locomotive Building Company.

Hackworth was in a partnership with Nicholas Downing in Shildon however the partnership was formally dissolved on 25 March 1837.

The oldest part still surviving is the Soho Shed. The grade II* listed building was built in 1826 as a warehouse for an iron merchant. The North Eastern Railway were the occupant from 1863 before becoming a paint shop for trains in the 1870s. In the 20th century it was used as a boxing gym and rehearsal space for the Shildon Works Silver Band. The shed still has two engine pits and the remnants of a 19th-century heating system. The engine shed along with Hackworth House was refurbished in 1975.

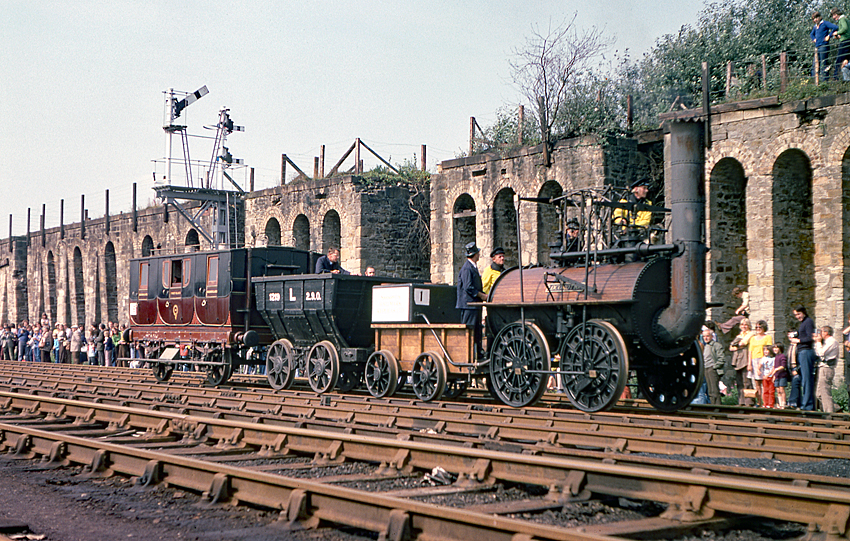
Locomotion No 1 replica passing the Shildon coal drops, 31 August 1975

Near the Soho Shed, 110 metres to the east, are the grade II* listed coal drops. Constructed circa 1846/47 or circa 1856 depending on source. The system was used for the refuelling of locomotive tenders. Coal wagons would be hauled to the top of the coal drops where their bottom would open and the coal would fall down a chute into the engine waiting below. (Hackworth House, the engine shed and the coal drops were all raised from Grade II to Grade II* on 11 May 2021.)

In this area also stand the Black Boy Stables and out buildings. The grade II listed stables were built in the early 19th century at the point where the branch lines met from the Black Boy Colliery and Surtees Railway. Restored in the 1970s the stables were damaged by fire in 1985. However, a 2016 report disputes their being stables. It states that while they are "clearly not stables", it believes one was possibly a plate layer's cabin. The use of the other "adjacent structures is still in some doubt". Other buildings include the goods shed and parcels office. It handled local freight distribution in Shildon from 1857. The parcels office looked after the movement of goods in and out of the shed.

The Soho Works built the first locomotive to run in Nova Scotia, Canada. The engine, named Samson, was shipped from Shildon in August 1838 to move coal from the coal mines at Stellarton.

The Stockton and Darlington Railway expanded their works on the western side of the Mason's Arms Crossing. This expansion alongside the nearby Soho works led to a surge in population as people came to the town for work. The pace of growth quickened further with the opening of Shildon Colliery to the south of the Soho Works in 1873.

In a letter to his sister, Timothy Hackworth Jr. describes the scene in the vicinity of the works:

I have just had a walk on the spoil bank for a few minutes. It is becoming quite a place of attraction. The men are now getting their gardens put into order and besides the Company have commenced making a reservoir on the top of the hill just opposite the works and hope they do not mean to drown us out of the place. It is such a splendid afternoon. There are hundreds of people walking out in the fields round our City, quite reminds me of the London parks on a Sunday.

— Timothy Hackworth Jr.

In 1855 the Soho Works were bought by the Stockton and Darlington Railway and made an extension of their works. Now merged with the North Eastern Railway in 1863 and locomotive production was shifted to their North Road Works in Darlington. The Shildon Works continued but focus was shifted to the construction of railway wagons.

To mark fifty years of the railway, The Northern Echo published an article which included this description of the town:

Shildon is one of the ugliest places on the earth's fair surface. It was once a swamp, the malaria from which laid many of its early inhabitants low with fever. It is now a hideous congerie of houses, growing like fungus on either side of a network of rails. A huge colliery rears its ungainly head close to the rails, and the noise of its working ceases not for ever. Engines are plying about with restless activity, like spiders running along the threads of their nets seeking for hapless flies.

— The Northern Echo

=== 20th century ===
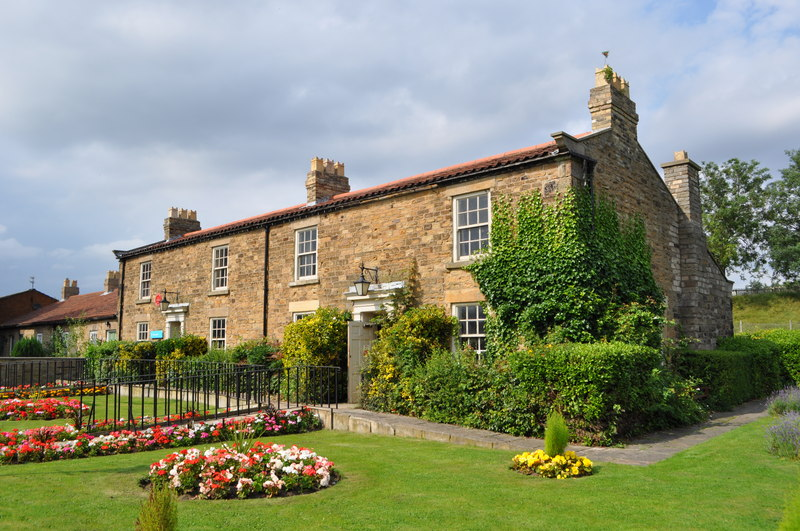
Timothy Hackworth's House

A strike in 1911 saw violent scenes in the town and British troops deployed to maintain order. A driver of a mineral train was stoned and dragged from his engine. He was pursued by an angry mob and had to be rescued by soldiers. Mineral wagons had their bottom doors undone and the contents allowed to fall out. Wagons in the sidings had their brakes undone and freewheeled for miles, railway signal cables were damaged and the cavalry had to be called. At one stage soldiers had to mount a Bayonet charge to clear a bridge. The New Shildon Strike Committee condemned the government for deploying the army and called for their withdrawal.

Moving further into the 20th Century the Shildon Works became the largest wagon works in the world by 1976, employing 2,600 people. The works built 1,000 wagons a year and repaired more besides. The 27 miles of sidings made Shildon home to what was believed to be the largest sidings in the world. This was until the construction of the Chicago marshalling yards in 1927.

There were concerns for the future of the railway works in the 1930s. The London and North Eastern Railway Company had decided to concentrate their operations to Darlington. Local MP Aaron Curry addressed the matter in the House of Commons on 14 December 1934.

"After all, Shildon is the home of the production of railways. Shildon is a town which grew up upon railway production—engines and so forth —and there is not a town in the whole of my division the future of which gives me greater concern than that town, with its population of 15,000 people. The collieries upon which they lived have already been not merely closed down but dismantled, and if now, on the top of that, you are going to permit of the transference of the railway shops, I tremble to think what will be the future of that once prosperous township".

— Aaron Curry MP, Hansard – 14 December 1934

The Soho works laid derelict since the 1940s and were scheduled for demolition in the 1970s when many of the buildings fell into disrepair. However, the buildings were saved when they were restored and opened to the public as part of the Timothy Hackworth Museum. The museum was opened on Thursday 17 July 1975 by Queen Elizabeth The Queen Mother.

==== Railway works closure ====
The railway works closed on 29 June 1984, with the loss of 1,750 jobs. David Mitchell MP, Transport Under-Secretary, opened the Hackworth Industrial Park on the site of the wagon works in 1985. The Shildon and Sedgefield Development Agency was established with a £1.6 million fund given by British Rail Engineering Limited (BREL) and also had backing from Shildon and Sedgfield Councils. The agency (as of 1985) spent £1 million in marketing the former workshops, giving loan guarantees as well giving business advice. The agency supported 100 companies with 57 being start ups and also paid £30 a week for a year to companies taking on former BREL staff.

==== Coach house ====
Shildon is also home to the grade II listed Daniel Adamson's Coach House (c.1831). In 1827 Daniel Adamson, landlord of the nearby Grey Horse pub, had a horse-drawn railway coach called Perseverance which ran between Shildon and Darlington. When the Surtees Railway opened in 1831, Adamson built the coach house. The building was to act as both station and shed. It is believed to be the earliest surviving railway coach house in the world. His son, also Daniel Adamson, became an engineer.

==== Brusselton incline ====
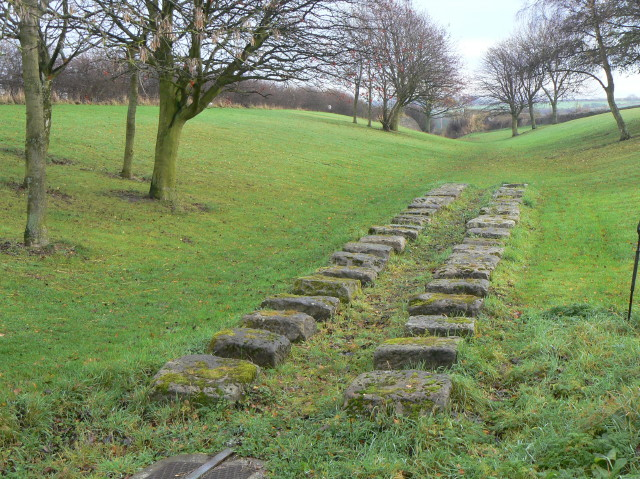
Brusselton incline

On the edge of Shildon is the hamlet of Brusselton. Two hills barred the way from the south Durham coalfield to the start of the railway at Shildon. George Stephenson overcame this by setting up stationary steam engines on the hilltops to haul the coal wagons over. One engine was at Etherley, this brought the wagons from Witton Park and lowered them down the slope to West Auckland. From there horses took the wagons to the Brusselton incline. At the top of this in an engine house were two 30 horsepower engines (later upgraded to a new 80 horsepower engine) acting in tandem. A large drum hanging above the road holding a rope pulled the wagons over the incline and to the locomotive waiting in Shildon.

A boiler house, chimney and railwaymen's houses sat on the north side of the road but have since been demolished. The engineman's house on the south side of the road still survives. A passenger service began over the incline in 1833 and a record set in 1839 with 2,120 tonnes of coal taken in 67 trips in a day.

The enginemen at the top of the incline were told when wagons (a mile and a half distant) were ready to make the ascent by means of a disc on the end of a tall pole. When the disc was set spinning the wagons were ready. To observe the spinning disc a telescope was set up. This is believed to be the first recorded railway signalling system in the world. In the event of fog, long wires with bells or rappers attached were used.

There were concerns about runaway wagons in the event of the rope snapping. The wagons' brakes could only be activated on board. For this reason young boys were employed to stand at the side of the track and run alongside in the event of a runaway wagon, jump aboard and apply the brake. At the bottom of the incline men were positioned with tree trunks and huge blocks of wood to cause a deliberate derailment in the event of an emergency by throwing them on the line.

To the west of Brusselton there were three bridges, the most westerly taking the railway under the Dere Street Roman road. The bridge is now gone but a 1925 article from the Northern Echo offers a description of what early rail passengers would have experienced.

"Descending the incline we come to the Roman road, as it is called, which was formerly carried over the railway by a bridge. These early railway bridges had not much headway, and the conductors of the coaches found it necessary when approaching them to shout to the passengers on the top 'heads down'."

— Northern Echo (1925)

On 23 April 1839 construction of the Shildon Tunnel (the south portal is Grade II listed) was started. It was opened in 1842 and was completed at a cost of £100,000. The completion of the tunnel in 1842 saw Brusselton bypassed, with the winding engines serving local collieries. In 1859 the engine was sold and the site became derelict.

Volunteers from the Brusselton Incline Group are working to uncover the industrial archaeology still on site. As of November 2014 the volunteers had uncovered 306 stone sleepers. The rails were laid on stone blocks weighing 75 lb (34 kg) when the line was laid. These were replaced with heavier stones in the 1830s which made the railway more stable.

=== National museum ===
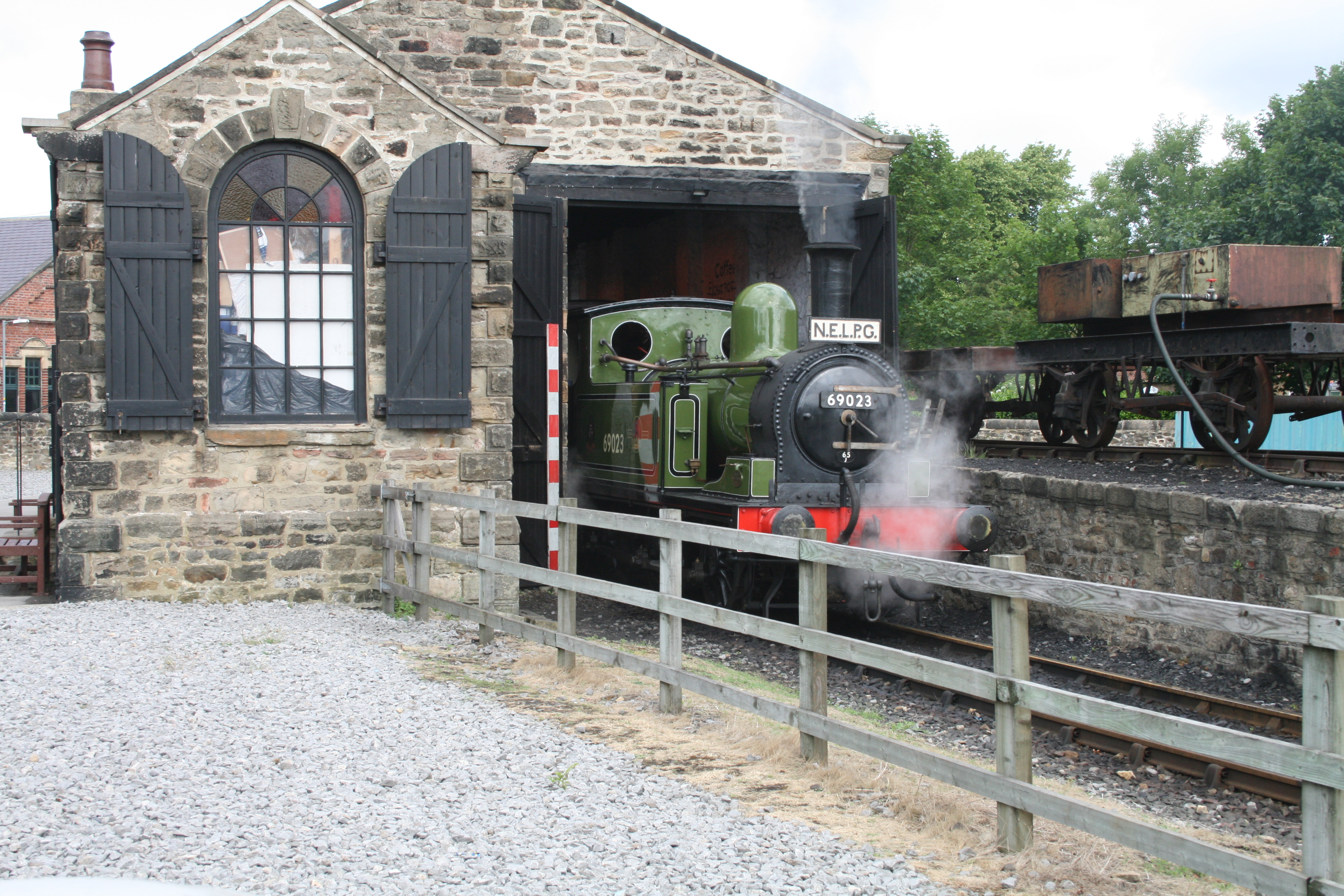
Part of the original railway Works now part of the Locomotion Museum

The Locomotion Museum, incorporating the existing Timothy Hackworth Museum and part of the National Railway Museum in York, was opened on Friday 22 October 2004. The museum was opened by the Prime Minister of the time Tony Blair.

"They have done a magnificent job and it is fitting that it should be in Shildon. It would not have been done without the support of local people. This area has gone through a huge change in recent years and to try and build something new which also includes our history, is a wonderful thing to do."

— Tony Blair (Prime Minister), BBC News

The new museum came about as part of a £70 million government funding arrangement for museums across the country. The project received £2 million from the European Regional Development Fund along with grant aid from a number of groups. The museum hoped to attract 60,000 visitors in the first year but had 70,000 visitors in the first two months. The town's bid for the museum was selected ahead of bids from Cardiff and Glasgow.

In January 2018, the site welcomed its 2,500,000th visitor, who was Sean Richards of Sedgefield, visiting with his family.

== Politics ==
Shildon is part of the Bishop Auckland parliamentary constituency, which is represented by Sam Rushworth of the Labour Party. He won the seat at the 2024 General Election with 17,036 votes.

The seat was previously held by Dehenna Davison of the Conservative Party. Davison won the seat at the 2019 UK general election from Helen Goodman of the Labour Party, who had held the seat since 2005. This ended 84 years of continuous Labour representation in the town.

In 2022 Davison announced she would not seek re-election.

On Durham County Council, the Shildon and Dene Valley ward has three Labour councillors.

== Education ==
- St. Johns C of E (Aided) Primary School
- Greenfield Academy
- Thornhill Primary School
- Timothy Hackworth Primary School

== Community and geography ==
The Shildon Town Band was founded in 1937 from the remnants of the Shildon Wesleyan Band. The band was conducted by Mr Ernie Bennett, other notable members were Ivan Pearce, The Allinson Brothers George, Fred, Jack and Jim, another long member was the secretary Graeme Scarlett.

=== Parks and green spaces ===
Hackworth Park is a park in Shildon town centre named after Timothy Hackworth. The park contains a drinking fountain created to commemorate one of the engines he designed and there is a statue of him.

=== Town Square ===
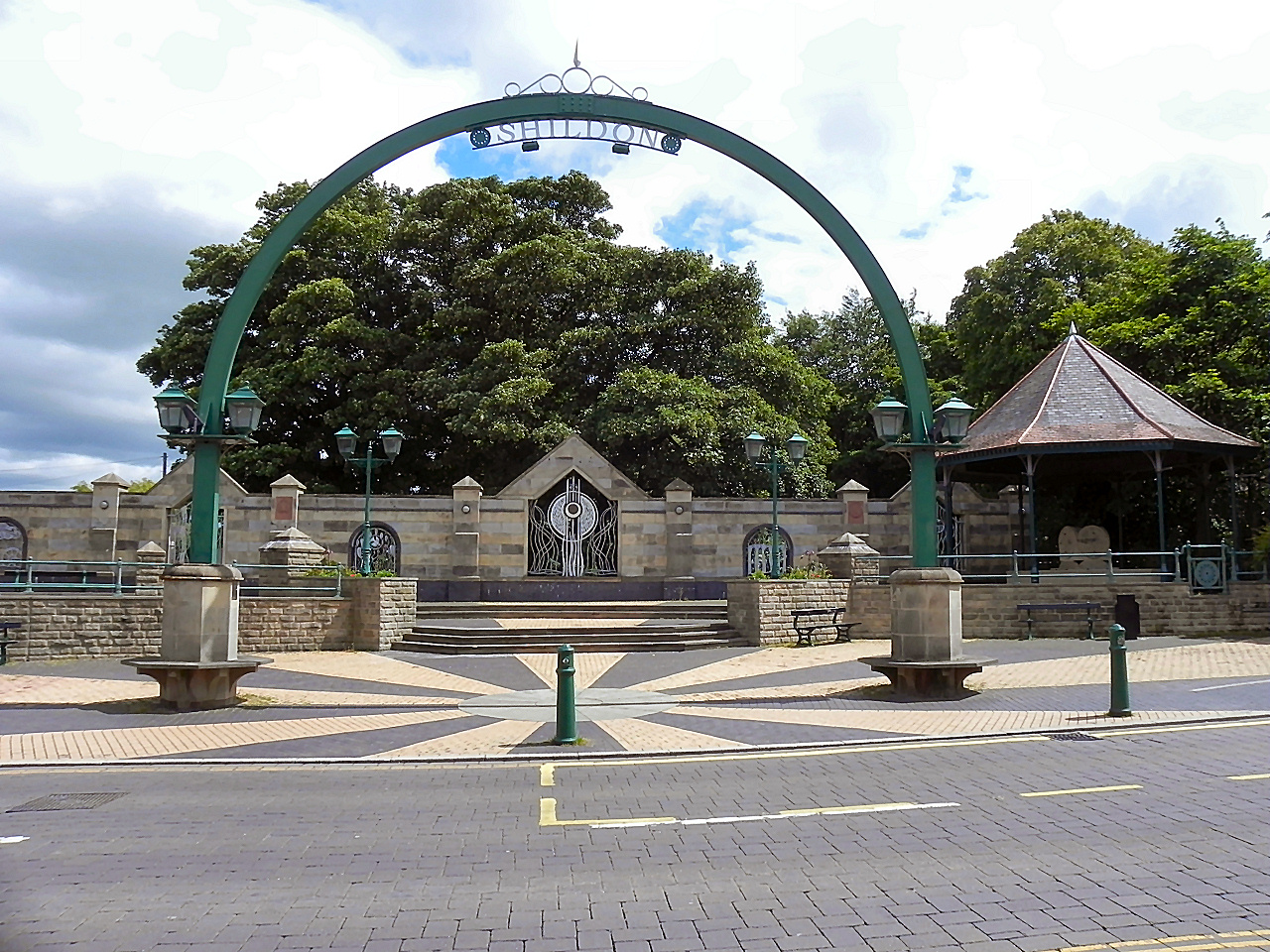
The square

Ahead of the new Millennium the town received £24 million in funding to make improvements to the town. These improvements included £380,000 for a new town square which is home to a 6-foot statue of Timothy Hackworth.

=== Distance to other places ===
Place	Distance	Direction	Relation
London	225 miles (362 km)	South	Capital
Stockton-on-Tees	14 miles (23 km)	South east	In the county area and significant to railway heritage
Durham	10 1/2 miles (16.9 km)	North	Nearest city and historic county town
Darlington	8 miles (13 km)	South east	Largest place in the county and significant to railway heritage
Newton Aycliffe	3 miles (4.8 km)	East	Next nearest town
Bishop Auckland	2 1/2 miles (4.0 km)	North west	next nearest town

== Sport ==
Local football club Shildon A.F.C. compete in the Ebac Northern League Division One. In November 2003, the club reached the FA Cup first round for the first time in 42 years, when in 1962 they lost 5–2 away to Oldham Athletic. In the 2003 match Shildon were beaten 7–2 away by Notts County. The club was successful in the 1930s, winning the Northern League on three occasions. In season 2014–15, they needed to win their final game to become Northern League Champions and add the title to the Northern League Cup and the Durham Challenge Cup. A 1–1 draw at Bedlington meant that they continue to wait for their first title since 1940.

Durham Tigers are the local rugby league team. The club runs age level teams in the North East Junior League.

Shildon Running & Athletic Club, founded in 1986, is based at the Stadium 2000 on Middridge Lane in Shildon .

Shildon Railway Cricket Club joined the NYSD premiere league in the 2015 season, and won the 3rd division at the first attempt.

== Transport ==
=== Rail ===
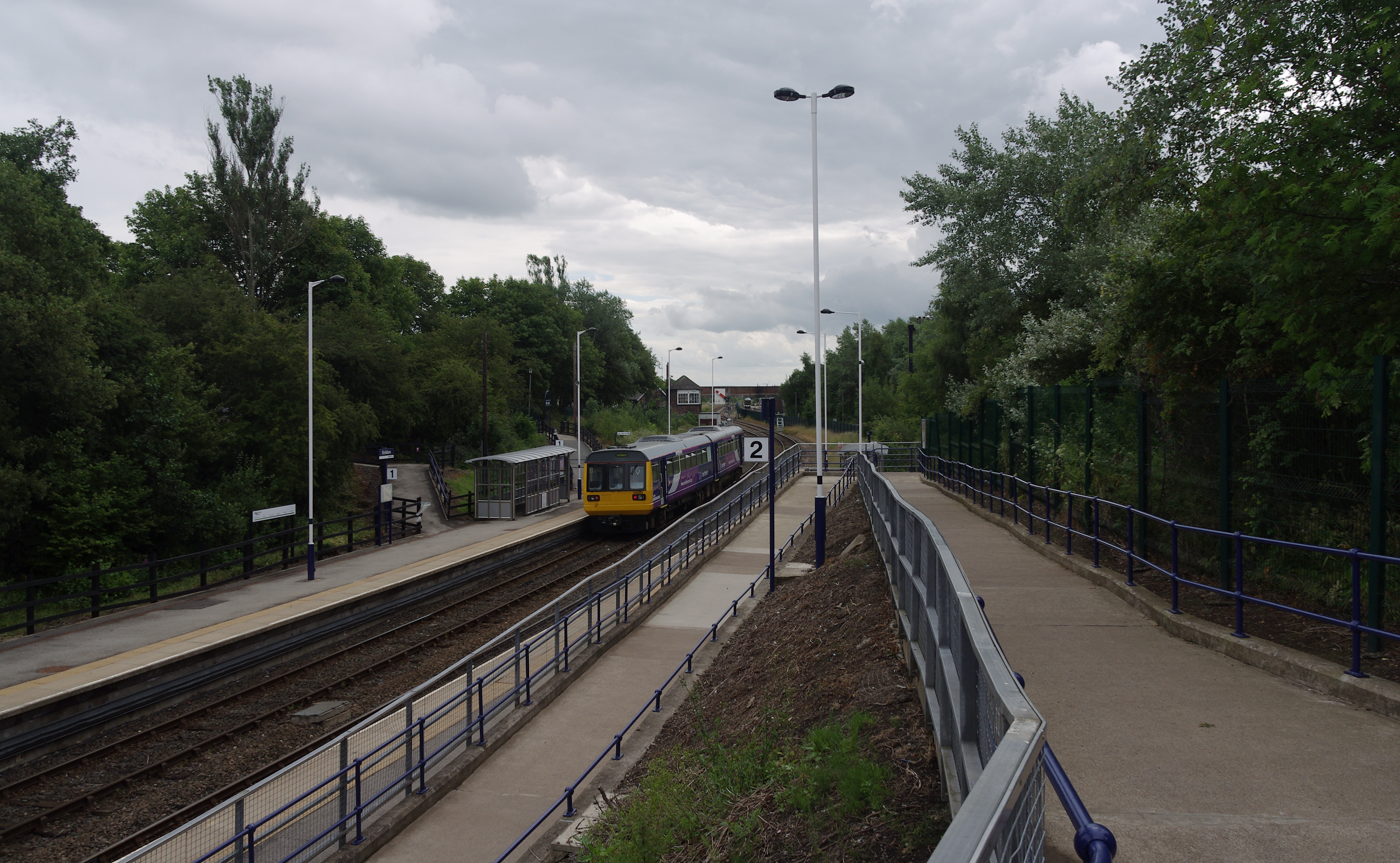
Shildon Railway Station

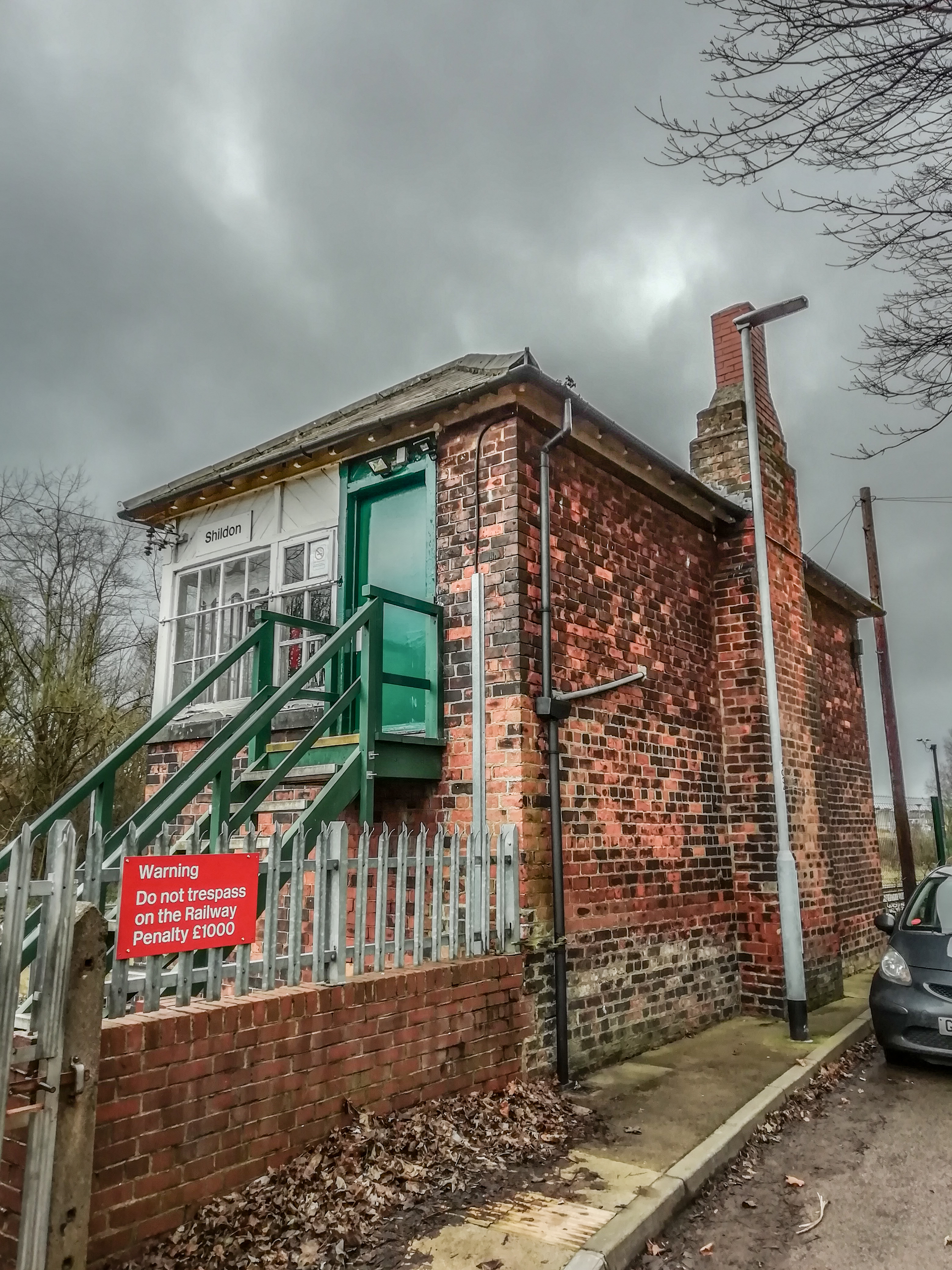
The Grade II listed signal box at Shildon believed to have been designed by Thomas Prosser.

Shildon Station is an unstaffed railway station managed by Northern. The signal box was built in 1887 (with alterations made in 1928 and 1984) and was possibly designed by Thomas Prosser is grade II listed. The station is served by the Bishop Line which runs between Bishop Auckland and Darlington. The service on the line is designated as Community rail by the Department for Transport in January 2011. The line continues between Darlington and Saltburn as the Tees Valley line.

=== Bus ===
Shildon is served by bus services operated by Arriva North East and Scarlet Band. The services are 5, 5A, X1, 1 and Weardale service 99

== Notable people ==
- Timothy Hackworth, railway engineer
- Daniel Adamson, railway engineer
- Sid Chaplin, writer, after whom the local library is named
- Harry Beevers, plant physiologist
- Thomas Ferens, politician
