= Henry Havelock-Allan =

Henry Havelock-Allan may refer to:

- Sir Henry Havelock-Allan, 1st Baronet VC (1830–1897), British soldier and politician, MP for Sunderland 1874–1881 and Durham South East 1885–1892 and 1895–1897
- Sir Henry Havelock-Allan, 2nd Baronet (1872–1953), British Liberal Party politician, MP for Bishop Auckland 1910–1918
- Sir Henry Havelock-Allan, 3rd Baronet (1899–1975)

See also

- Havelock-Allan baronets
