= James Boyden =

British politician

- Boyden in 1964

Member of Parliament for Bishop Auckland
- In office 1959–1979
- Preceded by: Hugh Dalton
- Succeeded by: Derek Foster

Personal details
- Born: 19 October 1910 Kingston upon Thames, Surrey, England
- Died: 26 September 1993 (aged 82) Oxford, England
- Party: Labour
- Spouse(s): Emily Pemberton (m. 1935; died 1988) Sue Hay (m. 1990)
- Education: King's College London
- Occupation: Politician, teacher, lecturer

Harold James Boyden (19 October 1910 – 26 September 1993) was a British Labour Party politician.

== Biography ==
Boyden was educated at Tiffin Boys' School, Kingston upon Thames, and King's College London, where he read history. Upon graduation he worked as a schoolmaster at Henry Mellish Grammar School in Nottingham and at Tiffin School, while widening his teaching experience by lecturing in the extra-mural departments of Nottingham, London and Southampton universities.

Following service in the Royal Air Force during World War II, he qualified as a barrister at Lincoln's Inn and became Director of Extramural Studies at Durham University from 1947 to 1959, serving as chair of the National Institute for Adult Education from 1958 to 1961. Boyden was also a councillor on Durham County Council from 1952 to 1960, representing Durham City, and a member of the executive of the Fabian Society.

Boyden was Member of Parliament for Bishop Auckland from 1959 to 1979, preceding Derek Foster. He was a junior minister for Education and Science from 1964 to 1965, Parliamentary Secretary for Public Building and Works from 1965 to 1967, and junior minister for Defence from 1967 to 1969. After his career as a junior minister was over he served as chairman of the Select Committee of Expenditure (1974–79) and as secretary of the Anglo-French Parliamentary Committee (1974–79).

== Notes ==
Parliament of the United Kingdom
| Preceded by Hugh Dalton | Member of Parliament for Bishop Auckland; 1959–1979 | Succeeded by Derek Foster |
