= Havelock-Allan baronets =

Baronetcy in the Baronetage of the United Kingdom

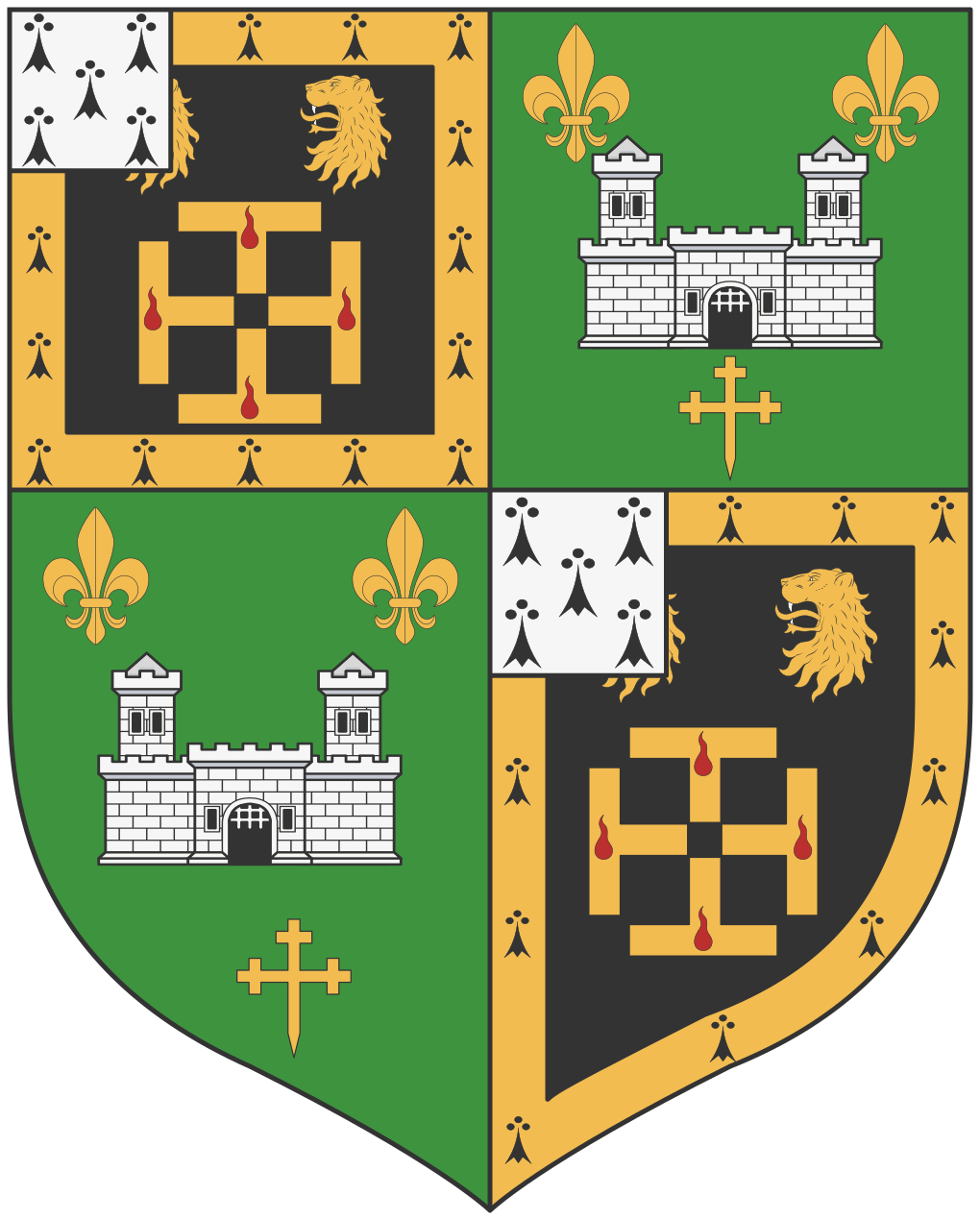
- Escutcheon of the Havelock-Allan baronets of Lucknow
- Creation date: 1858; 168 years ago
- Status: extant
- Seats: Blackwell Grange, County Durham

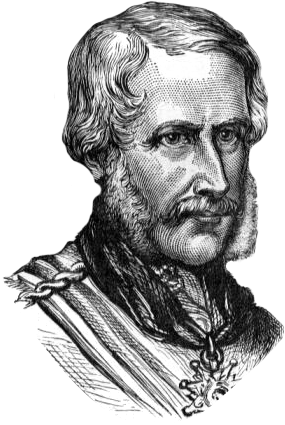
Major General Sir Henry Havelock

The Havelock-Allan Baronetcy, of Lucknow, is a title in the Baronetage of the United Kingdom. It was created on 22 January 1858. Originally intended for the celebrated soldier Sir Henry Havelock (who died two days before the patent was to be sealed), it was granted after his death to his eldest son and namesake Lieutenant-General Henry Havelock, with special remainder, in default of male issue of his own, to the male issue of his father. In 1880, having inherited the Durham estate of the Allans at Blackwell Grange, he assumed by Royal licence the additional surname of Allan. He was succeeded by his eldest son, the second Baronet. He represented Bishop Auckland in the House of Commons. The fourth Baronet was a film producer and the first husband of the actress Valerie Hobson. As of 2007 the title is held by their eldest son, the fifth Baronet, who succeeded in 2003.

== Havelock-Allan baronets, of Lucknow (1858) ==
- Sir Henry Marshman Havelock-Allan VC, GCB, 1st Baronet (1830–1897)
- Sir Henry Spencer Moreton Havelock-Allan, 2nd Baronet (1872–1953)
- Sir Henry Ralph Moreton Havelock-Allan, 3rd Baronet (1899–1975)
- Sir Anthony James Allan Havelock-Allan, 4th Baronet (1904–2003)
- Sir (Anthony) Mark David Havelock-Allan, 5th Baronet, QC, FCIArb (born 4 April 1951). Havelock-Allan was a Senior Circuit Judge between 2001 and 2017. He is the second son of the film producer, Sir Anthony Havelock-Allan, and his first wife, actress Valerie Hobson. He was educated at Eton and graduated from the University of Durham with a Bachelor of Arts in 1972 and then Trinity College, Cambridge in 1974 with a Bachelor of Laws. That year he entered the Inner Temple and thereafter practised as a barrister until 2001 when he became the Mercantile Judge on the Western Circuit, based in Bristol. He was appointed an Assistant Recorder in 1993 and a Recorder in 1997. He has been a Master of the Bench of the Inner Temple since 1995. Havelock-Allan has been married twice, firstly to Lucy Clare (née Mitchell-Innes; 1976–1984, divorced), and secondly (married 1986) to Dame Alison Foster, The Hon Mrs Justice Foster, DBE, with whom he has a son and two daughters. Havelock-Allan succeeded to the baronetcy on his father's death in 2003.

The heir apparent to the baronetcy is Harry Caspar Francis Havelock-Allan (born 1994), only son of the 5th Baronet.

== Sources ==
- Kidd, Charles, Williamson, David (editors). Debrett's Peerage and Baronetage (1990 edition). New York: St Martin's Press, 1990.
- Leigh Rayment's list of baronets
