= James Mellor Paulton =

British politician

- James Mellor Paulton

Member of Parliament for Bishop Auckland
- In office 1885-January 1910

Personal details
- Born: 1857
- Died: 6 December 1923 (aged 65–66)
- Political party: Liberal
- Parent: Abraham Walter Paulton (father)
- Relatives: James Mellor (grandfather)
- Education: Trinity Hall, Cambridge

James Mellor Paulton (1857 – 6 December 1923) was a British journalist and Liberal politician who sat in the House of Commons from 1885 to 1910.

== Biography ==
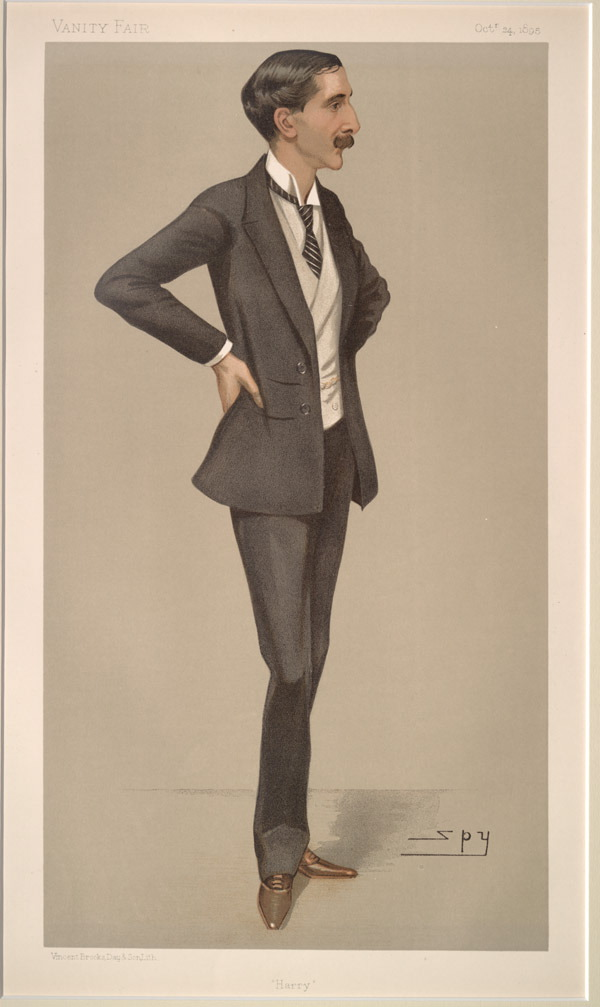
"Harry". Caricature by Spy published in Vanity Fair in 1895.

Paulton was the son of Abraham Walter Paulton of Bolton, and his wife Martha Mellor, daughter of James Mellor, of Liverpool. Venn says that his father was the first editor of the Manchester Examiner. Paulton was educated at London International College and at Trinity Hall, Cambridge. He was admitted at Inner Temple on 9 November 1878, but became a journalist. He was war correspondent for the Manchester Examiner in 1884 when he reported on the campaign in Egypt. He was present at Battle of El Teb in 1884.

At the 1885 general election, Paulton was elected as Member of Parliament for Bishop Auckland.

He was private Secretary to James Bryce and Hugh Childers in the Home Office in 1886, and assistant private secretary to H. H. Asquith from 1893 to 1895. He held his seat until he retired from the House of Commons at the January 1910 election.

Paulton was assistant paymaster-general at the Supreme Court from 1909 to 1921.

Parliament of the United Kingdom
New constituency	Member of Parliament for Bishop Auckland; 1885 – January 1910	Succeeded by Sir Henry Havelock-Allan
