= Dehenna Davison =

British Conservative politician (born 1993)

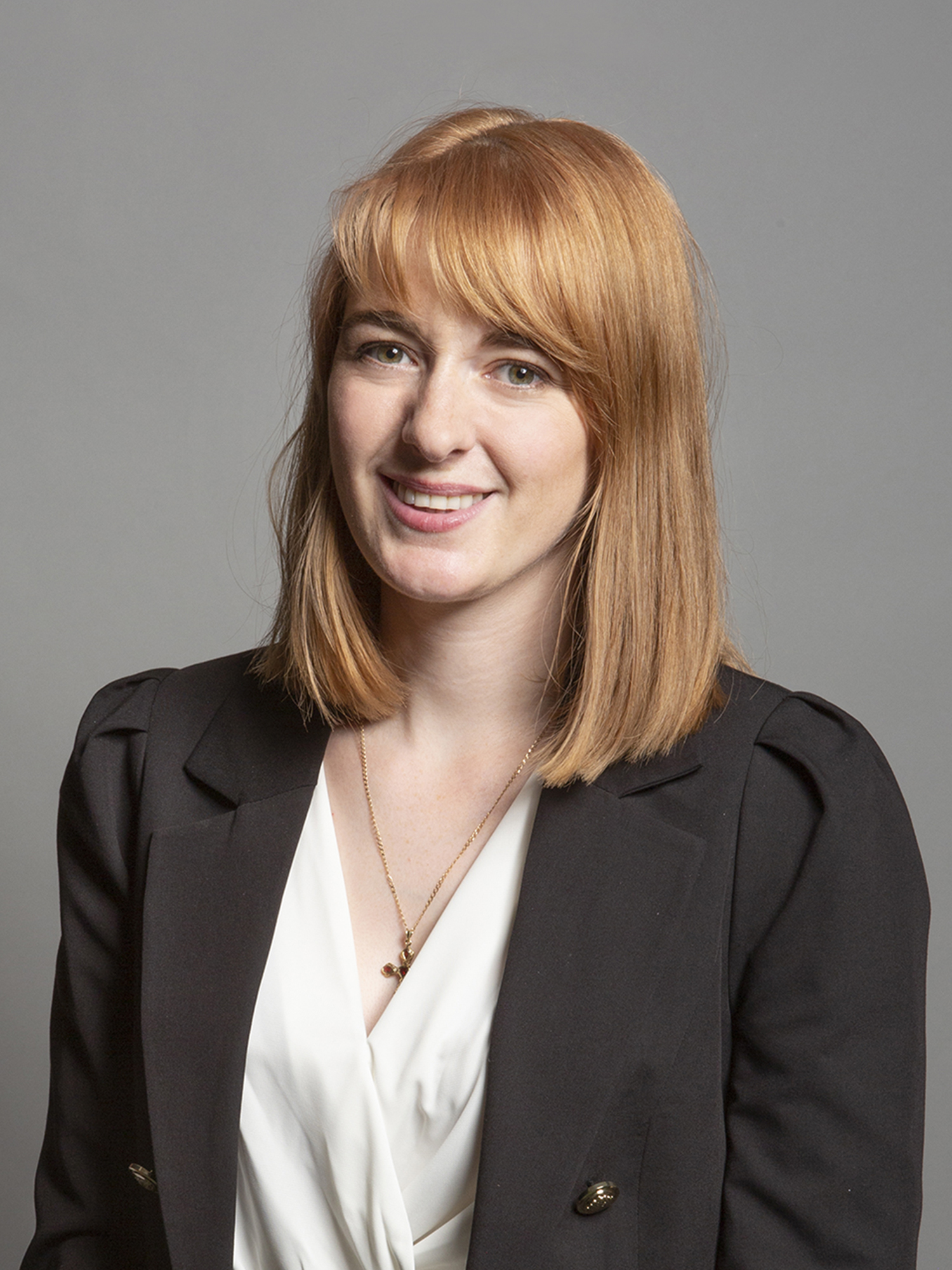
- Official portrait, 2019

Parliamentary Under-Secretary of State for Levelling Up
- In office 8 September 2022 – 18 September 2023
- Prime Minister: Liz Truss; Rishi Sunak
- Preceded by: Lia Nici
- Succeeded by: Jacob Young

Member of Parliament for Bishop Auckland
- In office 12 December 2019 – 30 May 2024
- Preceded by: Helen Goodman
- Succeeded by: Sam Rushworth

Personal details
- Born: Dehenna Sheridan Davison; 27 July 1993 (age 33) Sheffield, South Yorkshire, England
- Party: Conservative
- Spouse: John Fareham (m. 2018; sep. 2019)
- Education: University of Hull
- Occupation: Politician and former broadcaster
- Website: dehennadavison.com

Dehenna Sheridan Davison (/diˈɛnə/; born 27 July 1993) is a British former Conservative Party politician and broadcaster. She served as the Member of Parliament (MP) for Bishop Auckland from 2019 to 2024. She served as Parliamentary Under-Secretary of State for Levelling Up between September 2022 and September 2023.

Born to a stonemason and nursery nurse in Sheffield, Davison grew up on a council estate, and attended Sheffield High School on a scholarship. She studied British Politics and Legislative Studies at the University of Hull, where she was an NUS delegate, and successfully led a campaign to disaffiliate the university's student union in 2016.

Davison was elected as MP for Bishop Auckland in the 2019 general election. She was the Conservative candidate for Kingston upon Hull North and Sedgefield in the 2015 and 2017 general elections respectively. Davison is the first Conservative to represent the constituency since its creation in 1885. The seat had previously been held by Labour for 84 years. After her election, she was considered a "rising star" in the party, and an example of a Conservative representing a red wall constituency. However, in 2022 she announced that she would not stand for the next general election. She supported Liz Truss in her successful campaign to become Prime Minister in September 2022 and subsequently became Parliamentary Under-Secretary of State for Levelling Up, a role she retained under Rishi Sunak.

== Early life and education ==
Dehenna Sheridan Davison was born on 27 July 1993 in Sheffield, South Yorkshire, England, where she grew up on a council estate. Her father, Dominic, was a stonemason, and her mother, Nicola, was a nursery nurse. Davison attended Sheffield High School, a private school on a scholarship sponsored by the bank HSBC. When she was 13 years old, her father was attacked and killed. His assailant was acquitted of manslaughter but served 18 months in jail for a separate assault charge. Three years later, she represented the family at a criminal injuries compensation tribunal and has commented in interviews that the experience fostered her interest in politics.

Davison studied British Politics and Legislative Studies at the University of Hull. During her time at the university, she spent a year working as a parliamentary aide for Jacob Rees-Mogg, the MP for North East Somerset. Davison was also a NUS delegate and played for the university's lacrosse team. She led a successful campaign to disaffiliate the university's student union from the NUS in 2016. In the same year, Davison was the Conservative candidate for the Kings Park ward in the Hull City Council election, where she finished last. In 2018, she again contested and finished fifth in the Kingswood ward.

In her late teens and early twenties, while she was a student, Davison had a variety of jobs, including working in a video games retailer, a casino, a betting shop, and a branch of Pizza Hut. Prior to becoming an MP, Davison was a research and development analyst for LUMO, a company that advises businesses on tax credits.

== Parliamentary career ==
Davison was selected as the Conservative candidate for the Kingston upon Hull North constituency at the 2015 general election. She finished third behind the Labour Party and UK Independence Party candidates. Davison supported Brexit in the 2016 United Kingdom European Union membership referendum and is a classical liberal. She next contested Sedgefield at the 2017 general election, where she finished second behind the Labour candidate. In the 2019 Conservative Party leadership election, she supported Jeremy Hunt.

She was elected as MP for Bishop Auckland at the 2019 general election, with a majority of 7,962 (17.8%) on a swing of 9.5% from Labour to the Conservatives. Davison was the first Conservative MP for the constituency since its creation in 1885. The seat had been represented by a Labour MP since 1935. Her campaign focused on promises on Brexit, and reopening Bishop Auckland Hospital's emergency department, which had been closed in 2009. Since her election, she was considered a "rising star" in the party and a prominent Conservative representing a red wall constituency. She made her maiden speech on 16 January 2020. In that month, she voiced her support for scrapping the planned high-speed railway project HS2, and re-investing the money into local transport schemes.

On 14 February 2020, it was reported that Davison had been photographed with two far-right activists at a party to celebrate Brexit on 31 January in her constituency. In response, Davison distanced herself from the views of the two men, stating, "These photos were taken at an event open to the public and I in no way whatsoever condone the views highlighted of the individuals concerned."

Davison was a member of the Home Affairs Select Committee from March 2020 to November 2021. She is also a member of the European Research Group, on the steering committee of the China Research Group, on the board of the Blue Collar Conservatives, and a member of the parliamentary council of the centre-right think tank The Northern Policy Foundation.

In September 2020, Davison was criticised by her own party after she mocked then Scottish Labour leader Richard Leonard for having an English accent and suggested that this was the reason for Labour's decline in support in Scotland. A spokesman for the Scottish Conservatives said that: "This criticism is unacceptable. It plays into the kind of divisive politics that the SNP promote."

In February 2021, Davison created the All-Party Parliamentary Group (APPG) for One-Punch Assaults and served as its chair till September 2022. Her father died of a one-punch assault when she was 13 years old.

She launched the Free Market Forum, a group of Conservative MPs advocating classical liberalism that is affiliated with the Institute of Economic Affairs think tank with Greg Smith in April 2021.

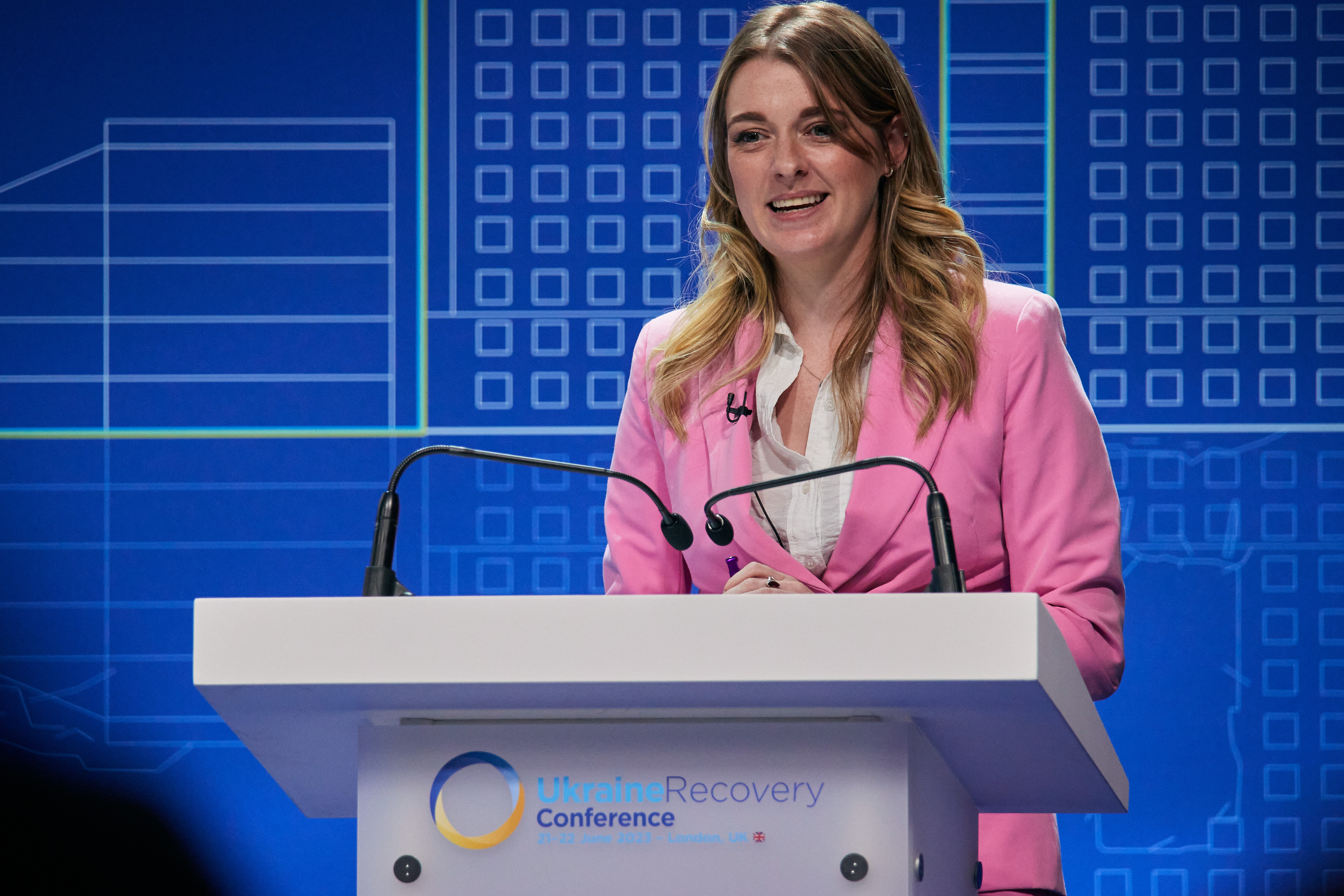
Davison at the Ukraine Recovery Conference, 2023

Davison was a co-host of The Political Correction on GB News on Sunday mornings between June 2021 and September 2022.

Davison abstained on the vote for the Health and Social Care Levy in September 2021. The levy increased National Insurance Contributions paid by employees and employers by 1.25% between April 2022 and 2023 before becoming a separate tax from then on. She was also one of 99 Conservative MPs to vote against the introduction of COVID passes in England in December 2021. In early 2022, she voiced her support for the reform of the Gender Recognition Act 2004 to include self-identification, and a conversion therapy ban to include transgender people.

Davison was one of 148 MPs to vote against Prime Minister Boris Johnson in the 2022 Conservative Party vote of confidence in his leadership on 6 June. Johnson survived the vote of confidence but resigned on 7 July 2022 following the Chris Pincher scandal and the subsequent government crisis. She endorsed Liz Truss in the July–September 2022 Conservative Party leadership election.

Truss became Prime Minister on 6 September 2022 and Davison was appointed as Parliamentary Under Secretary of State at the Department for Levelling Up, Housing and Communities two days later. Rishi Sunak succeeded Truss as a result of the October 2022 Conservative Party leadership election and Davison retained her role.

On 25 November 2022, Davison announced that she would not seek re-election as an MP at the next general election citing the need to have a "life outside of politics" and support her family. On 18 September 2023, she resigned as Parliamentary Under-Secretary of State for Levelling Up due to chronic migraine. In November 2023, Davison was named in the BBC's 100 Women list, which features 100 inspiring and influential women from around the world. In March 2024, she obtained the first parliamentary debate on migraines since the 1960s and stated her experiences as "life-ruining" and called for better access to treatments. Davison also participated in the London Marathon in the same year in aid of the National Migraine Centre.

== Post-parliamentary career ==
Davison is a supporter of assisted dying and joined the campaign organisation My Death, My Decision as senior political officer in December 2024 after completing her term as MP in July 2024. She joined the County Durham-based private transport firm Holdham Group as its Chief Growth Officer in August 2026.

== Personal life ==
Davison married Hull City councillor John Fareham, who is 35 years her senior, in 2018 (when Fareham was 59 and Davison was 24). The couple appeared together on the Channel 4 documentary series Bride and Prejudice, which showed their wedding at the Guildhall, Kingston upon Hull. They separated before the 2019 general election.

Davison came out as bisexual in 2021, and was the first openly bisexual female Conservative MP.

Since 2022, she has been in a relationship with diplomat Tony Kay. Kay became the deputy British Ambassador to Brazil in July 2024 and Davison moved to Brasília in August to join him. Kay has two children from a previous marriage.

As part of Mental Health Awareness Week 2019, Davison discussed her personal experience of depression and suicidal ideation while working in London as a parliamentary aide, after her grandmother had been diagnosed with, and subsequently died of lung cancer. She has also been open about her past use of antidepressants.

Parliament of the United Kingdom
Preceded by Helen Goodman	Member of Parliament for Bishop Auckland; 2019–2024	Succeeded by Sam Rushworth
Political offices
Preceded by Lia Nici	Parliamentary Under-Secretary of State for Levelling Up; 2022–2023	Succeeded by Jacob Young
