= Derek Foster, Baron Foster of Bishop Auckland =

British politician (1937–2019)

The Right Honourable The Lord Foster of Bishop Auckland PC DL MP
- Official portrait, 2005

Shadow Chancellor of the Duchy of Lancaster
- In office 19 October 1995 – 2 May 1997
- Leader: Tony Blair
- Preceded by: Ann Taylor
- Succeeded by: Michael Heseltine

Shadow Minister for the Citizen's Charter
- In office 19 October 1995 – 2 May 1997
- Leader: Tony Blair
- Preceded by: Ann Taylor
- Succeeded by: Position abolished

Opposition Chief Whip of the House of Commons
- In office 23 October 1985 – 19 October 1995
- Leader: Neil Kinnock; John Smith; Margaret Beckett (acting); Tony Blair
- Preceded by: Michael Cocks
- Succeeded by: Donald Dewar

Member of the House of Lords
- Lord Temporal
- Life peerage 16 June 2005 – 6 January 2019

Member of Parliament for Bishop Auckland
- In office 3 May 1979 – 11 April 2005
- Preceded by: James Boyden
- Succeeded by: Helen Goodman

Personal details
- Born: Derek Foster; 25 June 1937 Sunderland, England
- Died: 5 January 2019 (aged 81) Sunderland, England
- Party: Labour
- Education: St Catherine's Society, Oxford

Derek Foster, Baron Foster of Bishop Auckland, PC, DL, MP (25 June 1937 – 5 January 2019) was a British Labour politician who served as Member of Parliament for Bishop Auckland, in County Durham, from 1979 to 2005.

== Political career ==
Foster was first elected to represent Bishop Auckland at the 1979 general election, and held this seat until his retirement in 2005. He served as opposition Chief Whip between 1985 and 1995, becoming a member of the Privy Council in 1993. After Tony Blair became leader in 1994, he was keen to appoint a new Chief Whip and asked Foster to stand aside, in return for the promise of a seat in the Cabinet if and when Labour returned to power. Foster eventually agreed and became Shadow Chancellor of the Duchy of Lancaster in 1995.

However, when Labour won the 1997 election, Foster was appointed to the relatively junior role of Parliamentary Secretary in the Cabinet Office, under David Clark. After giving the matter further thought, Foster stood down from the government after just two days, and later publicly accused Mr Blair of having broken his promise to him. He was eventually appointed chair of the Commons sub-committee on employment, becoming something of a thorn in the Government's side during Mr Blair's first term. However, the employment sub-committee was abolished in 2001 and he became a backbencher, retiring from the Commons at the 2005 general election.

He was appointed as a deputy lieutenant of County Durham in 2001, giving him the post-nominal letters "DL" for life. On 13 May 2005 it was announced that he would be created a life peer, and in June 2005 the peerage was gazetted as Baron Foster of Bishop Auckland, of Bishop Auckland in the County of Durham. He died from cancer at a hospital in Sunderland on 5 January 2019, at the age of 81.

== Other interests ==
Foster was deeply committed to The Salvation Army, serving at the Sunderland Millfield Corps, whilst also a member of the Labour Friends of Israel Policy Council.

== Arms ==
Coat of arms of Derek Foster, Baron Foster of Bishop Auckland
Adopted 2007 Coronet Coronet of a Baron Crest An auk Azure beaked and supporting with the dexter foot a crozier Or. Escutcheon Azure two pallets interlaced with two barrulets Or all between four mitres Argent. Supporters On either side an ptter statant erect Azure supporting with the exterior forepaw and blowing a trumpet Or. Motto TO SERVE THE PRESENT AGE Badge An otter's face Azure surmounting four trumpets in cross bells outward Argent and four trumpets in saltire bells outward Or. Symbolism The association of Durham with a gold cross on an Azure field is featured in a varied form in the Arms. The cross formation is placed between four mitres as a punning allusion on Bishop Auckland. Punning on Bishop Auckland is also extended into the Crest. In addition to being an industrious animal, the otter is associated with rivers and Bishop Auckland is sited on the River Wear. It is depicted in association with trumpets as the grantee has a particular interest in brass bands.

Parliament of the United Kingdom
Preceded by James Boyden	Member of Parliament for Bishop Auckland; 1979–2005	Succeeded by Helen Goodman
Party political offices
Preceded by Michael Cocks	Labour Chief Whip of the House of Commons; 1985–1995	Succeeded by Donald Dewar
Political offices
Preceded by Michael Cocks	Opposition Chief Whip of the House of Commons; 1985–1995	Succeeded by Donald Dewar
Preceded by Ann Taylor	Shadow Chancellor of the Duchy of Lancaster; 1995–1997	Succeeded by Michael Heseltine
Preceded by Ann Taylor	Shadow Minister for the Citizen's Charter; 1994–1995	Position abolished
