= Alison Foster =

British judge (born 1957)

The Honourable Mrs Justice Foster DBE

High Court Judge King's Bench Division
- Incumbent
- Assumed office 1 October 2019

Personal details
- Born: 22 January 1957
- Spouse: Sir Mark Havelock-Allan, 5th Baronet (m. 1986)
- Children: 3
- Education: Jesus College, Oxford
- Profession: Barrister

Dame Alison Lee Caroline Foster, Lady Havelock-Allan DBE (born 22 January 1957), styled The Hon Mrs Justice Foster, is a British barrister and judge of the High Court of England and Wales.

Foster was appointed to the High Court of England and Wales in October 2019, assigned to the Queen's Bench Division.

== Personal ==
Foster married Sir Mark Havelock-Allan on 22 May 1986. They have three children.

== Education ==
Foster attended Jesus College, Oxford where she read English, and then the Courtauld Institute of Art, where she read for an MPhil in illuminated texts. She subsequently studied the law conversion course at London's City University with the benefit of a scholarship from Jesus College. She was elected an Hon. Fellow of Jesus College in 2020.

== Career ==
Foster practised in tax and administrative law at 39 Essex Chambers, where she rose to be joint head of chambers, before she was appointed a judge.

Foster was called to the Bar by Inner Temple in 1984, and appointed Queen's Counsel in 2002. In the same year she was elected a Bencher of Inner Temple. She was appointed a Deputy High Court Judge in the Chancery Division in 2008 and in the Queen's Bench Division, Administrative Court, in 2018.
