= Ben Spoor =

British politician

The Right Honourable Ben Spoor OBE
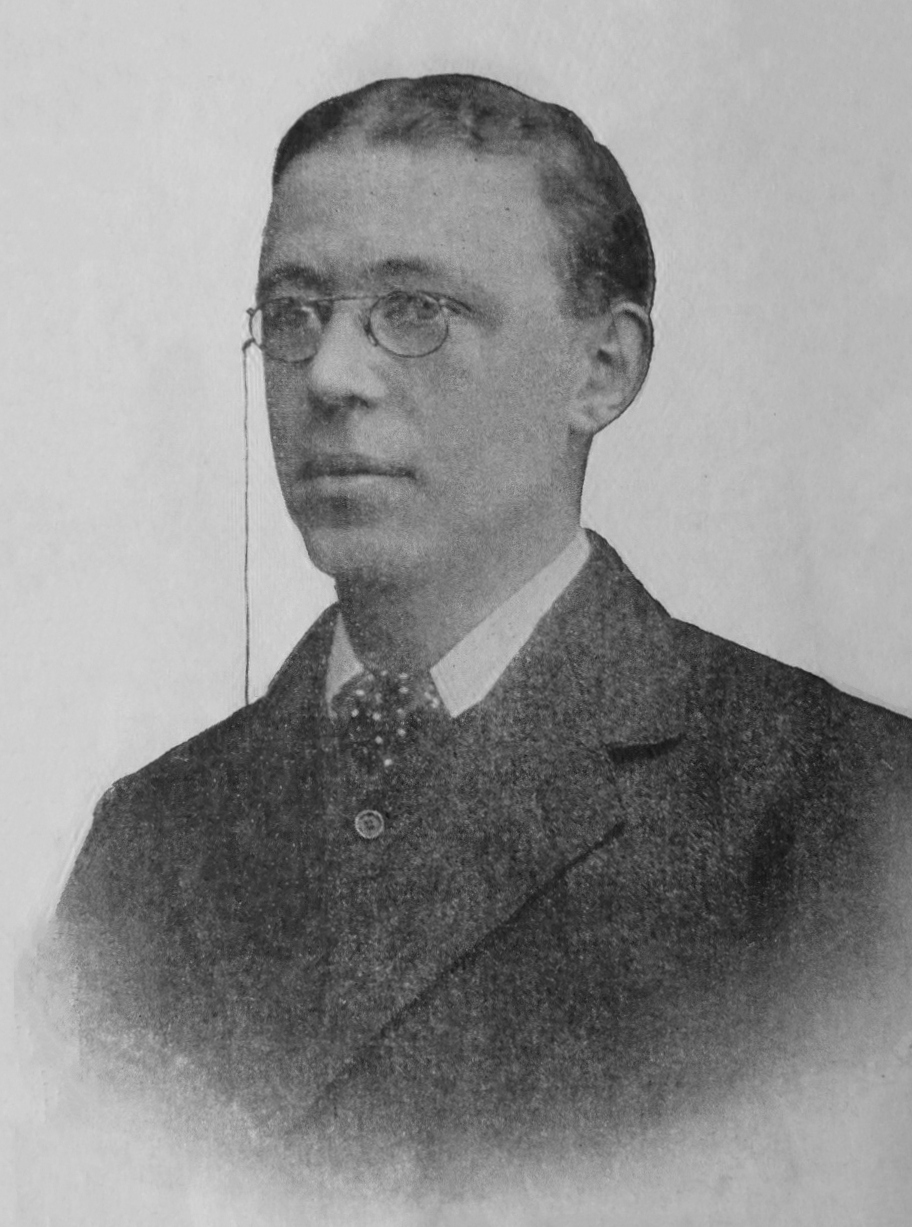
- Spoor

Member of Parliament for Bishop Auckland
- In office 1918–1928
- Preceded by: Henry Havelock-Allan, Bt
- Succeeded by: Ruth Dalton

Personal details
- Born: Benjamin Charles Spoor; 2 June 1878 Witton Park
- Died: 22 December 1928 (aged 50) Regent Palace Hotel
- Party: Labour
- Spouses: Annie Louisa Leybourne (m. 1900; died 1920) Ann Mary Fraser (m. 1923)
- Children: Alec Spoor
- Parents: John Joseph Spoor (father); Merrion Spoor (mother)
- Education: Bishop Barrington School; Elmfield College, York

Benjamin Charles Spoor PC (2 June 1878 – 22 December 1928), OBE, was a British Labour Party politician. He took a particular interest in India.

Born in Witton Park, County Durham, he went to Elmfield College, York, and came from a family of Primitive Methodists. An engineer by training, he later went into business as a builder's merchant. Before entering politics, he was a lay preacher in the Methodist Church.

At the 1918 general election, he was elected as Member of Parliament for Bishop Auckland, and held the seat until his death at the age of fifty. In Parliament, he found himself at odds with many Labour MPs and contemplated joining the Liberal Party. He was the Parliamentary Secretary to the Treasury and Chief Whip in 1924, when he was made a Privy Councillor.

He had suffered from poor health since contracting malaria at Salonika during World War I. On a visit to London in December 1928, he was found dead in bed at the Regent Palace Hotel. At the inquest, his son said that his father had taken to drinking heavily. His death, it was decided, was due to syncope from disease of the heart and liver, due to chronic alcoholism.

Parliament of the United Kingdom
Preceded by Henry Havelock-Allan, Bt	Member of Parliament for Bishop Auckland; 1918–1928	Succeeded by Ruth Dalton
Political offices
Preceded by Bolton Eyres-Monsell	Parliamentary Secretary to the Treasury; 1924	Succeeded by Bolton Eyres-Monsell
