= Sir Henry Havelock-Allan, 2nd Baronet =

British peer & politician (1872-1953)

Sir Henry Spencer Moreton Havelock-Allan, 2nd Baronet DL (30 January 1872 – 28 October 1953) was a Liberal Party politician in the United Kingdom.

Havelock-Allan was born at Blackwell Grange, the eldest son of Sir Henry Havelock-Allan. In 1897, he inherited his father's baronetcy. On 7 April 1905, he was made a Deputy Lieutenant for Durham.

At the January 1910 general election, he became Member of Parliament (MP) for Bishop Auckland, and was Parliamentary Private Secretary to Edwin Samuel Montagu, in the latter's role as Chancellor of the Duchy of Lancaster from 1911 to 1914 and Under-Secretary of State for India in 1913. Whilst still an MP, Havelock-Allan joined the 17th Battalion of the Lancashire Fusiliers and fought in France in the First World War, where he was wounded in 1916. He did not stand for Parliament again at the 1918 general election.

Havelock-Allan married three times but had no children. One of his wives were Edith Mary Sowerby, daughter of Thomas Charles Johnson Sowerby and sister-in-law of Lady Mabel Annesley. On his death in 1953, his baronetcy passed to his nephew, Henry.

Parliament of the United Kingdom
Preceded by James Paulton	Member of Parliament for Bishop Auckland; Jan. 1910–1918	Succeeded by Ben Spoor
Baronetage of the United Kingdom
Preceded by Henry Marshman Havelock-Allan	Baronet (of Lucknow); 1897–1953	Succeeded by Henry Ralph Moreton Havelock-Allan
