= Helen Goodman =

Former British Labour politician (born 1958)

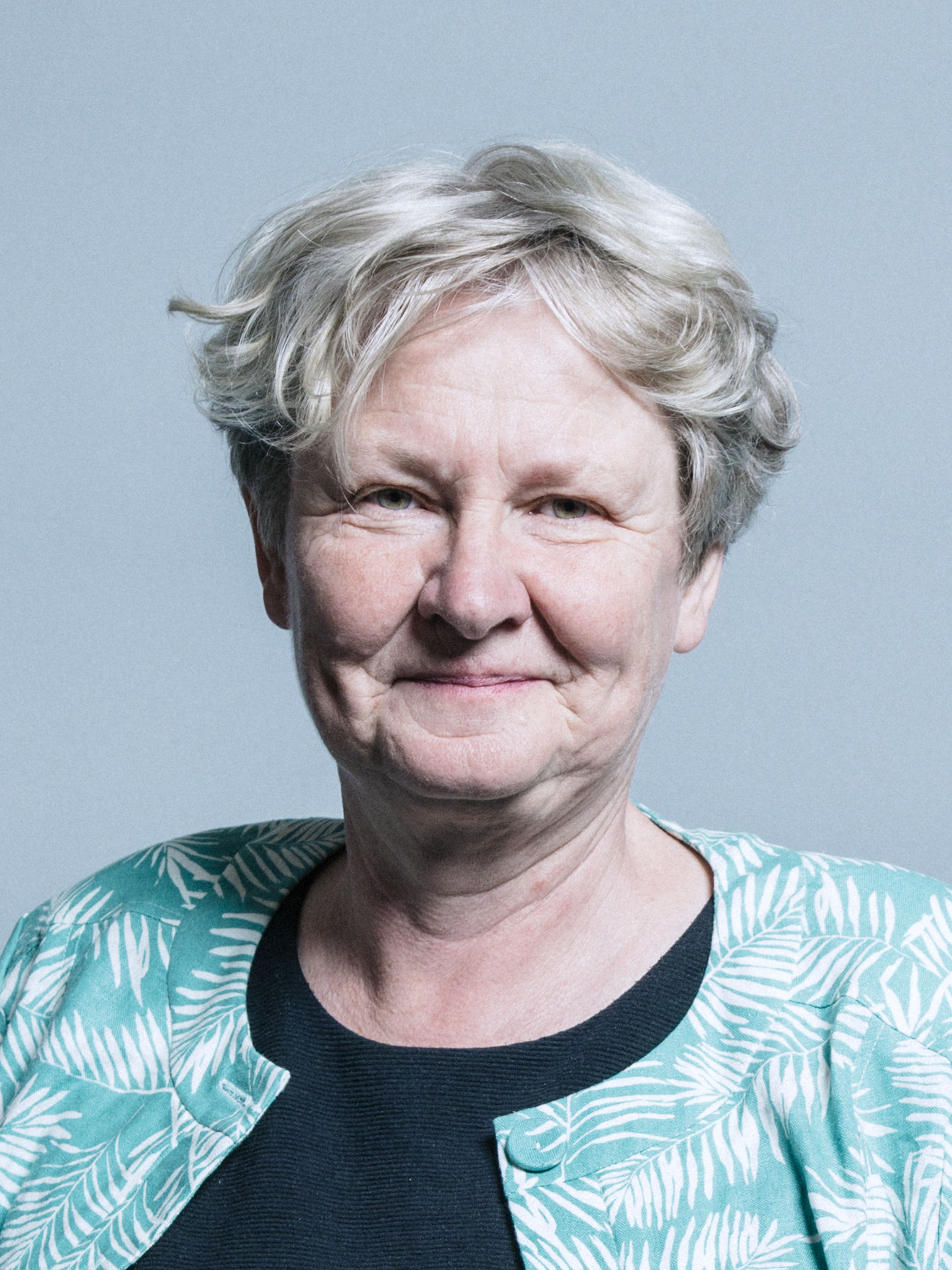
- Official portrait, 2017

Parliamentary Under-Secretary of State for Work and Pensions
- In office 9 June 2009 – 11 May 2010
- Prime Minister: Gordon Brown
- Preceded by: Kitty Ussher
- Succeeded by: Maria Miller

Deputy Leader of the House of Commons
- In office 28 June 2007 – 5 October 2008
- Prime Minister: Gordon Brown
- Leader: Harriet Harman
- Preceded by: Paddy Tipping
- Succeeded by: Chris Bryant

Member of Parliament for Bishop Auckland
- In office 5 May 2005 – 6 November 2019
- Preceded by: Derek Foster
- Succeeded by: Dehenna Davison

Shadow portfolios
- 2010–2011: Shadow Minister for Prisons
- 2011–2014: Shadow Minister for Culture and Media
- 2014–2015: Shadow Minister for Welfare Reform
- 2017–2019: Shadow Minister for Americas, Far East and Overseas Territories

Personal details
- Born: Helen Catherine Goodman; 2 January 1958 (age 68) Nottingham, Nottinghamshire, England
- Party: Labour
- Spouse: Charles Seaford
- Children: 2
- Education: Somerville College, Oxford

Helen Catherine Goodman (born 2 January 1958) is a British former politician who served as Member of Parliament for Bishop Auckland from 2005 to 2019. A member of the Labour Party, she was Deputy Leader of the House of Commons from 2007 to 2008 and a Parliamentary Under-Secretary of State for Work and Pensions from 2009 to 2010. She also served in government as an Assistant Whip from 2008 to 2009.

Goodman was a Shadow Minister for Justice from 2010 to 2011, Shadow Minister for Culture and Media from 2011 to 2014 and Shadow Minister for Welfare Reform from 2014 to 2015. She was briefly a Shadow Minister for Work and Pensions in 2010, and returned to the front bench as a Shadow Minister for Foreign and Commonwealth Affairs from 2017 to 2019.

== Early life and career ==
Helen Catherine Goodman was born on 2 January 1958 in Nottingham, England. Her mother was a Danish immigrant and her father worked as an architect. Raised in Derbyshire, Goodman was educated at her village's primary school and Lady Manners School, Bakewell. She studied philosophy, politics and economics at Somerville College, Oxford and worked as a researcher for Labour MP Phillip Whitehead upon graduation.

Goodman worked in HM Treasury as a fast stream administrator, holding posts on the Energy Desk, Exchange Rate Desk, Central Budget Unit and Overseas Finance Unit. From 1990 to 1991, she was seconded to the Office of the Czechoslovak Prime Minister to advise on their economic transition post-Velvet Revolution. In 1992, she negotiated an agreement within the OECD to end government subsidies on arms exports to highly indebted countries. Goodman also oversaw the establishment of the Home Energy Efficiency Scheme in 1990.

She was appointed director of the Commission on the Future for MultiEthnic Britain in 1997 and became head of strategy at The Children's Society in 1998. From 2002 until her election to Parliament, Goodman was Chief Executive of the National Association of Toy and Leisure Libraries.

== Parliamentary career ==
Goodman was selected as the Labour candidate for Bishop Auckland for the 2005 general election, through an all-women shortlist, following the retirement of incumbent MP Derek Foster. She held the historically safe seat at the election and made her Commons maiden speech in May 2005. Goodman's majority was halved at the 2010 general election and reduced further in 2015. She narrowly held her seat with a majority of 502 votes in 2017, but was defeated by Conservative Dehenna Davison at the 2019 general election.

Goodman was a member of the Public Accounts Committee from May 2005 until April 2007, when she became a Parliamentary Private Secretary at the Ministry of Justice. She was promoted to Deputy Leader of the House of Commons in June 2007, and departed the role to become an Assistant Whip in October 2008. In June 2009, Goodman became a Parliamentary Under-Secretary of State at the Department for Work and Pensions, with responsibility for child poverty and childcare. In her position, she oversaw the passage of the Child Poverty Act 2010.

After the 2010 general election, Goodman was appointed as a Shadow Work and Pensions Minister and nominated Ed Miliband in the subsequent Labour leadership election. She became a Shadow Minister for Justice following his election victory, responsible for prisons and sentencing, and Shadow Minister for Media from October 2011. In this role she has campaigned for better child protection online. Goodman was also given the culture portfolio in October 2013.

On 3 December 2014, she became Shadow Minister for Welfare Reform as part of a small Shadow Cabinet reshuffle by Ed Miliband. Since February 2016, Goodman has also served as a member of the Advisory Board at Polar Research and Policy Initiative.

In 2017, she took part in a campaign to save the DWP office in Bishop Auckland from closure. She raised questions in Parliament regarding the proposed office closure and took part in a match and Rally opposing the closure on 18 March 2017

In July 2017, Goodman was appointed as a junior spokesperson for Foreign and Commonwealth Affairs under Shadow Foreign Secretary, Emily Thornberry, with responsibility for the Americas and the Far East. In May 2018, she successfully led Labour's attempt to secure Magnitsky Clauses in the Sanctions and Anti-Money Laundering Bill during its Committee Stage and was instrumental in a cross-party initiative that secured an amendment to the Bill requiring public registers of beneficial ownership in the Overseas Territories. Other work included developing Labour's policy on the crisis in Hong Kong in 2019, visiting Colombia in May 2019 to meet various stakeholders involved in the implementation of Colombia's faltering peace process and frequently pressing the UK Government to act on a number of human rights issues including the treatment of the Uighur Muslims in Xinjiang, the Rohingya refugee crisis and the rights of West Papuans.

=== Views and campaigns ===
She is a member of the GMB Union and the Christian Socialist Movement, Amnesty International and Friends of the Earth. She has published numerous articles in publications including Political Quarterly and Foreign Policy Centre.

In 2010, she ran a successful campaign in conjunction with The Northern Echo to save the Zurbarán paintings at Auckland Castle when the Commissioners of the Church of England threatened to sell them. In February 2013, appalled at the impact of the "bedroom tax" on her constituents, she tried to live for a week on £18.

In June 2014, Goodman was invited to open the village fair in Ingleton, in her constituency. She talked about its waterfalls, caves and peaks. It emerged that she was actually talking about a different Ingleton, which was 70 miles away and not in her constituency.

Goodman supported Remain in the 2016 EU referendum. She was a leading campaigner for indicative parliamentary votes to resolve Brexit, and supported the proposal to remain in the EU customs union during the March 2019 ballots.

=== Controversies ===
In May 2009, The Daily Telegraph revealed that Goodman had claimed £519.31 for use of a cottage in her own constituency on her expenses, and had submitted hotel bills dated two months prior to being elected to the House of Commons. Goodman argued that she was carrying out Parliamentary business when using the cottage and thus her claim was accepted, and the claim for the hotel stay – which was rejected – was a mistake. She also claimed a £600 fee for advice from her management consultant husband. Goodman pointed out that the independent inquiry by Thomas Legg into MPs expenses had given her "an entirely clean bill of health and concluded that none of my claims required further explanation or clarification."

== Post-parliamentary career ==
Since 2020, she has been an associate fellow at Durham University and a member of the advisory board of Durham Energy Institute, working with them on geothermal research.

== Personal life ==
Goodman is married to Charles Seaford, a Senior Fellow at Demos. The couple have two children.

Parliament of the United Kingdom
Preceded by Derek Foster	Member of Parliament for Bishop Auckland; 2005–2019	Succeeded by Dehenna Davison
