= Bishop Auckland (constituency) =

Parliamentary constituency in the United Kingdom, 1885 onwards

Coordinates: 54.68°N 1.83°W

- County constituency for the House of Commons
- Interactive map of boundaries since 2024
- Location within North East England
- County: County Durham
- Population: 87,143 (2011 census)
- Electorate: 70,879 (March 2020)
- Major settlements: Bishop Auckland, Shildon, Barnard Castle, Crook

Current constituency
- Created: 1885
- Member of Parliament: Sam Rushworth (Labour)
- Seats: One
- Created from: South Durham

Bishop Auckland is a constituency in County Durham that is represented in the House of Commons since 2024 by Sam Rushworth of the Labour Party.

== Constituency profile ==
The constituency is located in an upland, western part of County Durham in the North East of England.

The constituency includes as its major settlements the towns of Barnard Castle, Bishop Auckland, Shildon, Middleton-in-Teesdale, Crook, Tow Law, Stanhope and Wolsingham, with their surrounding villages, dales and fields. The seat is named for the market town of Bishop Auckland which has a mixed modern and historic high street. It also includes the similarly sized Barnard Castle, together with large areas used for agriculture, particularly hill farming on the rolling landscape that cuts into the Pennines, with a substantial quantity of livestock. Most housing, many small towns and most facilities were built in the prosperous era of coal mining which brought thousands of workers to live in Bishop Auckland town and neighbouring settlements. Manufacturing, including food processing and packaging, public sector employment, retail and agriculture are the main employers.

Within the seat are Auckland Castle and Park, Lartington Hall, Witton Castle, Raby Castle, Binchester Roman Fort (Vinovia), The Bowes Museum, the Weardale Railway and enclosures and industrial workings on Cockfield Fell.

== History ==
From 1935 to 2017 inclusive, the seat's voters returned MPs from the Labour Party; the former Labour Chancellor of the Exchequer Hugh Dalton, was the MP for Bishop Auckland from 1929 to 1931, and after regaining the seat in 1935, remained an MP until 1959. The 2019 result returned a Conservative; the party's results had shown an increase from election to election from 2001 onwards, going from 20% of the vote in the previous 1997 election to a majority of votes at 53% in 2019. However, this was reversed in 2024 when the Conservative vote dropped back down to 25.6% and Labour regained the seat.

== Boundaries ==
=== Historic ===
==== 1885–1918 ====
- Part of the Sessional Division of Bishop Auckland.

The constituency was created for the 1885 general election by the Redistribution of Seats Act 1885 as one of eight new single-member divisions of the county of Durham, replacing the two 2-member seats of North Durham and South Durham. See map on Vision of Britain website.

==== 1918–1950 ====
- The Urban Districts of Bishop Auckland and Shildon; and
- part of the Rural District of Auckland.

Gained parts of Barnard Castle, offset by losses to the new constituencies of Sedgefield and Spennymoor.

==== 1950–1955 ====
- The Urban Districts of Barnard Castle, Bishop Auckland, and Shildon; and
- the Rural District of Barnard Castle.

The urban and rural districts of Barnard Castle transferred from the abolished constituency thereof.

==== 1955–1974 ====
As above, except the part of the Middridge ward transferred to the Rural District of Darlington by the County of Durham (Parish of Great Aycliffe) Confirmation Order 1952 (Statutory Instrument 1953/741).

==== 1974–1983 ====
- The Urban Districts of Barnard Castle, Bishop Auckland, and Shildon; and
- the Rural Districts of Barnard Castle and Darlington.

Gained the rural district of Darlington (which contained the new town of Newton Aycliffe) from the abolished constituency of Sedgefield.

==== 1983–1997 ====
- The District of Wear Valley wards of Bishop Auckland Town, Cockton Hill, Coundon, Coundon Grange, Escomb, Henknowle, St Helen's, West Auckland, and Woodhouse Close;
- the District of Teesdale; and
- the District of Sedgefield wards of Byerley, Middridge, Neville, Shafto, Simpasture, Sunnydale, Thickley, West, and Woodham.

Rural areas around Darlington returned to the re-established Sedgefield constituency.

Map of 1997-2024 boundaries

==== 1997–2024 ====
- The District of Wear Valley wards of Bishop Auckland Town, Cockton Hill, Coundon, Coundon Grange, Escomb, Henknowle, St Helen's, West Auckland, and Woodhouse Close;
- the District of Teesdale; and
- the District of Sedgefield wards of Byerley, Low Spennymoor and Tudhoe Grange, Middlestone, Spennymoor, Sunnydale, Thickley, and Tudhoe.

Gained Spennymoor from Sedgefield in exchange for Newton Aycliffe.

Following a review of parliamentary representation in County Durham in 2007, the Boundary Commission for England made no changes to the Bishop Auckland constituency. In the 2009 structural changes to local government in England, the local authority districts in Durham were abolished and replaced with a single unitary authority; however, this did not affect the boundaries of the constituency.

=== Current ===
Further to the 2023 review of Westminster constituencies, which came into effect for the 2024 general election, the constituency was defined as composing the following electoral divisions of County Durham (as they existed on 1 December 2020):

- Barnard Castle East; Barnard Castle West; Bishop Auckland Town; Coundon; Crook; Evenwood; Shildon and Dene Valley; Tow Law; Weardale; West Auckland; Woodhouse Close.

The constituency experienced significant boundary changes with Spennymoor and Tudhoe being transferred to the new constituency of Newton Aycliffe and Spennymoor, and Crook, Tow Law and Weardale being added from the abolished constituency of North West Durham.

Further to a local government boundary review which came into effect in May 2025, the constituency now comprises the following electoral divisions of County Durham:

- Barnard Castle; Bishop Auckland; Crook; Evenwood; Lower Teesdale; Shildon and Dene Valley; Upper Teesdale; Weardale (nearly all); West Auckland; and small parts of Spennymoor, and Willington and Hunwick.

== Members of Parliament ==
Election	Member	Party
1885	James Mellor Paulton	Liberal
Jan. 1910	Sir Henry Havelock-Allan, Bt.	Liberal
1918	Ben Spoor	Labour
1929 by-election	Ruth Dalton	Labour
1929	Hugh Dalton	Labour
1931	Aaron Curry	Liberal National
1935	Hugh Dalton	Labour
1959	James Boyden	Labour
1979	Derek Foster	Labour
2005	Helen Goodman	Labour
2019	Dehenna Davison	Conservative
2024	Sam Rushworth	Labour

== Elections ==
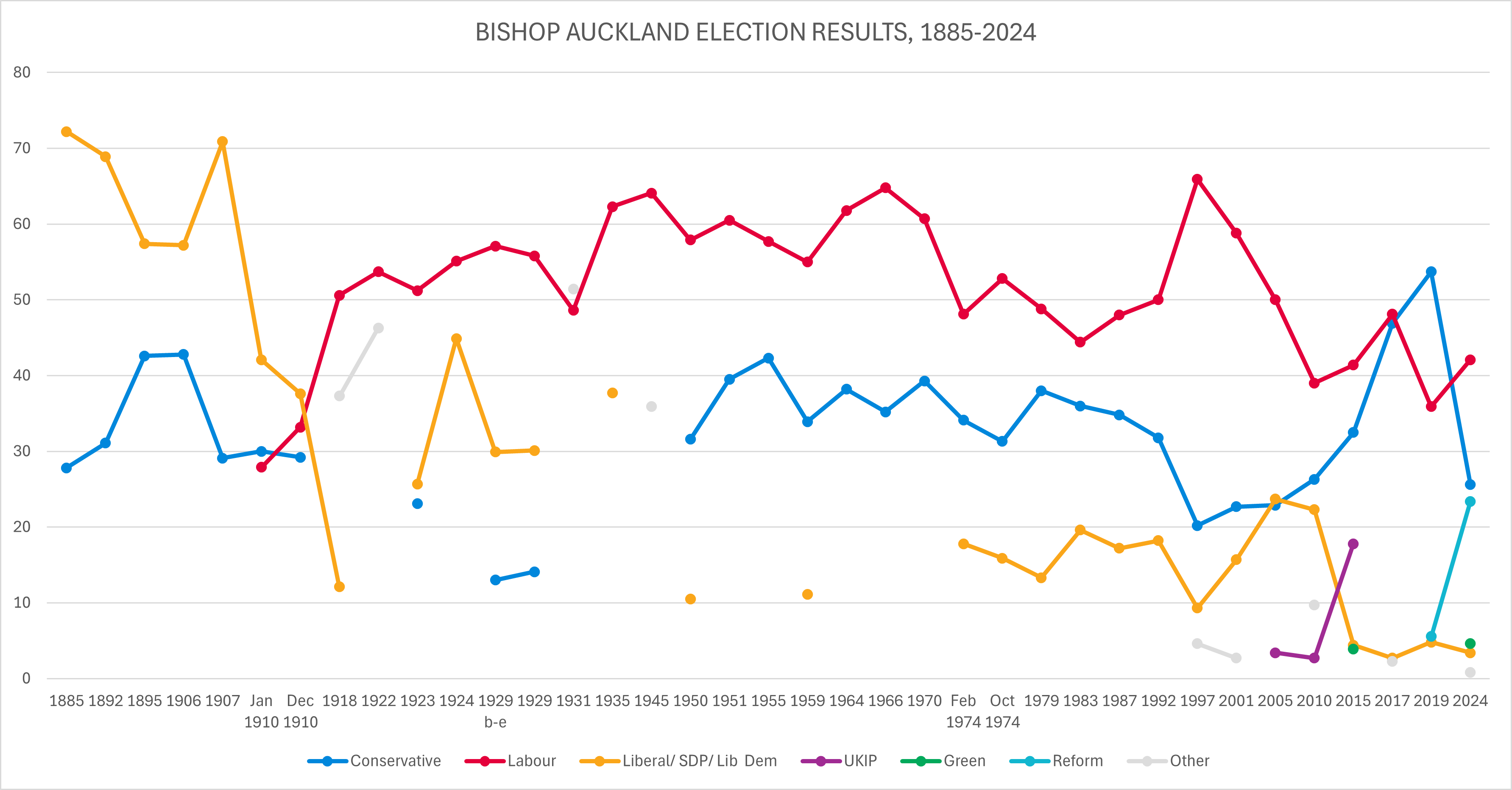
Election results 1885-2024

=== Elections in the 2020s ===
General election 2024: Bishop Auckland
Party	Candidate	Votes	%	±%
Labour	Sam Rushworth	17,036	42.1	▲5.5
Conservative	Jane MacBean	10,364	25.6	▼27.4
Reform	Rhys Burriss	9,466	23.4	▲17.9
Green	Sarah Hannan	1,857	4.6	▲4.0
Liberal Democrats	Helen Cross	1,373	3.4	▼0.2
Transform	Rachel Maughan	331	0.8	N/A
Majority		6,672	16.5	N/A
Turnout		40,427	57.1	▼12.8
Labour gain from Conservative		Swing	▲16.5	

=== Elections in the 2010s ===
General election 2019: Bishop Auckland
Party	Candidate	Votes	%	±%
Conservative	Dehenna Davison	24,067	53.7	+6.8
Labour	Helen Goodman	16,105	35.9	−12.2
Brexit Party	Nicholas Brown	2,500	5.6	N/A
Liberal Democrats	Ray Georgeson	2,133	4.8	+2.1
Majority		7,962	17.8	N/A
Turnout		44,805	65.7	+1.7
Conservative gain from Labour		Swing	+9.5	

General election 2017: Bishop Auckland
Party	Candidate	Votes	%	±%
Labour	Helen Goodman	20,808	48.1	+6.7
Conservative	Christopher Adams	20,306	46.9	+14.4
Liberal Democrats	Ciaran Morrissey	1,176	2.7	−1.7
BNP	Adam Walker	991	2.3	N/A
Majority		502	1.2	−7.7
Turnout		43,281	64.1	+4.5
Labour hold		Swing	-3.85	

General election 2015: Bishop Auckland
Party	Candidate	Votes	%	±%
Labour	Helen Goodman	16,307	41.4	+2.4
Conservative	Christopher Adams	12,799	32.5	+6.2
UKIP	Rhys Burriss	7,015	17.8	+15.1
Liberal Democrats	Stephen White	1,723	4.4	−18.0
Green	Thom Robinson	1,545	3.9	N/A
Majority		3,508	8.9	−3.8
Turnout		39,389	59.6	−0.6
Labour hold		Swing	-1.9	

General election 2010: Bishop Auckland
Party	Candidate	Votes	%	±%
Labour	Helen Goodman	16,023	39.0	−11.1
Conservative	Barbara Harrison	10,805	26.3	+3.4
Liberal Democrats	Mark Wilkes	9,189	22.3	−1.3
BNP	Adam Walker	2,036	4.9	N/A
Local Liberals People Before Politics	Sam Zair	1,964	4.8	N/A
UKIP	Dave Brothers	1,119	2.7	−0.7
Majority		5,218	12.7	−13.7
Turnout		41,136	60.2	+4.0
Labour hold		Swing		

=== Elections in the 2000s ===
General election 2005: Bishop Auckland
Party	Candidate	Votes	%	±%
Labour	Helen Goodman	19,065	50.0	−8.8
Liberal Democrats	Chris Foote Wood	9,018	23.7	+8.0
Conservative	Richard Bell	8,736	22.9	+0.2
UKIP	Margaret Hopson	1,309	3.4	N/A
Majority		10,047	26.3	−9.8
Turnout		38,128	56.5	−0.7
Labour hold		Swing		

General election 2001: Bishop Auckland
Party	Candidate	Votes	%	±%
Labour	Derek Foster	22,680	58.8	−7.1
Conservative	Fiona P. McNish	8,754	22.7	+2.5
Liberal Democrats	Chris Foote Wood	6,073	15.7	+6.4
Green	Carl D. Bennett	1,052	2.7	N/A
Majority		13,926	36.1	−9.6
Turnout		38,559	57.2	−11.2
Labour hold		Swing	−4.8	

=== Elections in the 1990s ===
General election 1997: Bishop Auckland
Party	Candidate	Votes	%	±%
Labour	Derek Foster	30,359	65.9	
Conservative	Josephine H. Fergus	9,295	20.2	
Liberal Democrats	Les Ashworth	4,293	9.3	
Referendum	David Blacker	2,104	4.6	
Majority		21,064	45.7	
Turnout		46,051	68.4	
Labour hold		Swing		

General election 1992: Bishop Auckland
Party	Candidate	Votes	%	±%
Labour	Derek Foster	27,763	50.0	+2.0
Conservative	David R. Williamson	17,676	31.8	−3.0
Liberal Democrats	William P. Wade	10,099	18.2	+1.0
Majority		10,087	18.2	+5.0
Turnout		55,538	76.5	+2.4
Labour hold		Swing	+2.5	

=== Elections in the 1980s ===
General election 1987: Bishop Auckland
Party	Candidate	Votes	%	±%
Labour	Derek Foster	25,648	48.0	+3.6
Conservative	Robin Wight	18,613	34.8	−1.2
Liberal	George Irwin	9,195	17.2	−2.4
Majority		7,035	13.2	+4.8
Turnout		53,456	74.1	+2.0
Labour hold		Swing	+2.4	

General election 1983: Bishop Auckland
Party	Candidate	Votes	%	±%
Labour	Derek Foster	22,750	44.4	
Conservative	Barry Legg	18,444	36.0	
Liberal	Arthur Collinge	10,070	19.6	
Majority		4,306	8.4	
Turnout		51,264	72.1	
Labour hold		Swing		

=== Elections in the 1970s ===
General election 1979: Bishop Auckland
Party	Candidate	Votes	%	±%
Labour	Derek Foster	27,200	48.8	−4.0
Conservative	Michael Irvine	21,160	38.0	+6.7
Liberal	J.D. Frise	7,439	13.3	−2.6
Majority		6,040	10.8	−11.7
Turnout		55,799	74.7	+3.8
Labour hold		Swing	−5.4	

General election October 1974: Bishop Auckland
Party	Candidate	Votes	%	±%
Labour	James Boyden	27,181	52.8	+4.7
Conservative	D.W. Etheridge	16,086	31.3	−2.8
Liberal	David Lytton Cobbold	8,168	15.9	−1.9
Majority		11,095	21.5	+7.5
Turnout		51,435	70.9	−7.5
Labour hold		Swing	+3.8	

General election February 1974: Bishop Auckland
Party	Candidate	Votes	%	±%
Labour	James Boyden	27,101	48.1	−12.6
Conservative	D.W. Etheridge	19,226	34.1	−5.2
Liberal	J.D. Frise	10,044	17.8	N/A
Majority		7,875	14.0	−7.4
Turnout		56,371	78.4	+7.4
Labour hold		Swing	−3.7	

General election 1970: Bishop Auckland
Party	Candidate	Votes	%	±%
Labour	James Boyden	21,257	60.7	−4.1
Conservative	Tom J. Wiseman	13,769	39.3	+4.1
Majority		7,488	21.4	−8.2
Turnout		35,026	71.0	−2.4
Labour hold		Swing	−4.1	

=== Elections in the 1960s ===
General election 1966: Bishop Auckland
Party	Candidate	Votes	%	±%
Labour	James Boyden	22,015	64.8	+3.0
Conservative	Jeremy Vivian Ropner	11,936	35.2	−3.0
Majority		10,079	29.6	+6.0
Turnout		33,951	73.4	−3.2
Labour hold		Swing	+3.0	

General election 1964: Bishop Auckland
Party	Candidate	Votes	%	±%
Labour	James Boyden	22,310	61.8	+6.8
Conservative	Jeremy Vivian Ropner	13,782	38.2	+4.3
Majority		8,528	23.6	+2.5
Turnout		36,092	76.2	−4.6
Labour hold		Swing	+1.3	

=== Elections in the 1950s ===
General election 1959: Bishop Auckland
Party	Candidate	Votes	%	±%
Labour	James Boyden	21,706	55.0	−2.7
Conservative	Neil W. Murray	13,377	33.9	−8.4
Liberal	Gurney Pease	4,377	11.1	N/A
Majority		8,329	21.1	+5.7
Turnout		39,460	80.8	+3.8
Labour hold		Swing	+2.9	

General election 1955: Bishop Auckland
Party	Candidate	Votes	%	±%
Labour	Hugh Dalton	21,804	57.7	
Conservative	Robert Douglas M Youngson	15,959	42.3	
Majority		5,845	15.4	
Turnout		37,763	77.0	
Labour hold		Swing		

General election 1951: Bishop Auckland
Party	Candidate	Votes	%	±%
Labour	Hugh Dalton	25,881	60.5	+2.6
Conservative	Bruce Lionel Butcher	16,895	39.5	+7.9
Majority		8,986	21.0	−5.3
Turnout		42,776	85.1	−1.4
Labour hold		Swing	−5.3	

General election 1950: Bishop Auckland
Party	Candidate	Votes	%	±%
Labour	Hugh Dalton	25,039	57.9	
Conservative	Antony Lambton	13,669	31.6	
Liberal	Louis William Malby	4,527	10.5	
Majority		11,370	26.3	
Turnout		43,235	86.5	
Labour hold		Swing		

=== Elections in the 1940s ===
General election 1945: Bishop Auckland
Party	Candidate	Votes	%	±%
Labour	Hugh Dalton	20,100	64.1	+1.8
National Liberal	William John Wilson Tily	11,240	35.9	N/A
Majority		8,860	28.2	+3.6
Turnout		31,340	74.0	−5.2
Labour hold		Swing	N/A	

=== Elections in the 1930s ===
General election 1935: Bishop Auckland
Party	Candidate	Votes	%	±%
Labour	Hugh Dalton	20,481	62.3	+13.7
Liberal	Aaron Curry	12,395	37.7	−13.7
Majority		8,086	24.6	N/A
Turnout		32,876	79.2	−3.2
Labour gain from Liberal		Swing		

General election 1931: Bishop Auckland
Party	Candidate	Votes	%	±%
National Liberal	Aaron Curry	17,751	51.4	N/A
Labour	Hugh Dalton	16,796	48.6	−7.2
Majority		955	2.8	N/A
Turnout		34,547	82.5	+6.0
National Liberal gain from Labour		Swing		

=== Elections in the 1920s ===
General election 1929: Bishop Auckland
Party	Candidate	Votes	%	±%
Labour	Hugh Dalton	17,838	55.8	+0.7
Liberal	Aaron Curry	9,635	30.1	−14.8
Unionist	Herbert Thompson	4,503	14.1	N/A
Majority		8,203	25.7	+15.5
Turnout		31,976	76.5	−4.4
Registered electors		41,772		
Labour hold		Swing	+7.8	

Bishop Auckland by-election, 1929
Party	Candidate	Votes	%	±%
Labour	Ruth Dalton	14,797	57.1	+2.0
Liberal	Aaron Curry	7,725	29.9	−15.0
Unionist	Herbert Thompson	3,357	13.0	N/A
Majority		7,072	27.2	+17.0
Turnout		25,879	74.4	−6.5
Registered electors		34,787		
Labour hold		Swing	+8.5	

General election 1924: Bishop Auckland
Party	Candidate	Votes	%	±%
Labour	Ben Spoor	15,786	55.1	+3.9
Liberal	John Bainbridge	12,868	44.9	+19.2
Majority		2,918	10.2	−15.3
Turnout		28,654	80.9	+5.4
Registered electors		35,438		
Labour hold		Swing	−7.7	

General election 1923: Bishop Auckland
Party	Candidate	Votes	%	±%
Labour	Ben Spoor	13,328	51.2	−2.5
Liberal	John Bainbridge	6,686	25.7	−20.6
Unionist	Robert Gee	6,024	23.1	N/A
Majority		6,642	25.5	+18.1
Turnout		26,038	75.5	+0.7
Registered electors		34,487		
Labour hold		Swing	+9.1	

General election 1922: Bishop Auckland
Party	Candidate	Votes	%	±%
Labour	Ben Spoor	13,946	53.7	+3.1
National Liberal	Egbert Atherley-Jones	12,019	46.3	N/A
Majority		1,927	7.4	−5.9
Turnout		25,965	74.8	+14.0
Registered electors		34,730		
Labour hold		Swing	N/A	

=== Elections in the 1910s ===
Rutherford

General election 1918: Bishop Auckland
Party		Candidate	Votes	%	±%
	Labour	Ben Spoor	10,060	50.6	
C	National Liberal	Godfrey Vick	7,417	37.3	
	Liberal	Vickerman Rutherford	2,411	12.1	
Majority			2,643	13.3	N/A
Turnout			19,888	60.8	
	Labour gain from Liberal		Swing		
C indicates candidate endorsed by the coalition government.

General Election 1914–15: Another General Election was required to take place before the end of 1915. The political parties had been making preparations for an election to take place and by July 1914, the following candidates had been selected;

- Liberal: Vickerman Rutherford
- Unionist: Richard George Tyndall Bright
- Labour: Ben Spoor

General election December 1910: Bishop Auckland
Party	Candidate	Votes	%	±%
Liberal	Henry Havelock-Allan	4,531	37.6	−4.5
Labour	William House	3,993	33.2	+5.3
Conservative	Gervase Edward Markham	3,519	29.2	−0.8
Majority		538	4.4	−7.7
Turnout		12,043	82.8	−5.2
Registered electors		14,552		
Liberal hold		Swing	−4.9	

General election January 1910: Bishop Auckland
Party	Candidate	Votes	%	±%
Liberal	Henry Havelock-Allan	5,391	42.1	−28.8
Conservative	Walter Chaytor	3,841	30.0	+0.9
Labour	William House	3,579	27.9	N/A
Majority		1,550	12.1	−29.7
Turnout		12,811	88.0	+6.0
Registered electors		14,552		
Liberal hold		Swing	−14.9	

=== Elections in the 1900s ===
General election 1906: Bishop Auckland
Party	Candidate	Votes	%	±%
Liberal	James Mellor Paulton	7,430	70.9	+13.7
Conservative	Gervase Edward Markham	3,056	29.1	−13.7
Majority		4,374	41.8	+27.4
Turnout		10,486	82.0	+6.9
Registered electors		12,790		
Liberal hold		Swing	+13.7	

General election 1900: Bishop Auckland
Party	Candidate	Votes	%	±%
Liberal	James Mellor Paulton	4,872	57.2	−0.2
Conservative	William Hustler Hopkins	3,641	42.8	+0.2
Majority		1,231	14.4	−0.4
Turnout		8,513	75.1	−4.8
Registered electors		11,341		
Liberal hold		Swing	−0.2	

=== Elections in the 1890s ===
Paulton

General election 1895: Bishop Auckland
Party	Candidate	Votes	%	±%
Liberal	James Mellor Paulton	5,032	57.4	−11.5
Conservative	Gervase Edward Markham	3,735	42.6	+11.5
Majority		1,297	14.8	−23.0
Turnout		8,767	79.9	+5.3
Registered electors		10,979		
Liberal hold		Swing	-11.5	

General election 1892: Bishop Auckland
Party	Candidate	Votes	%	±%
Liberal	James Mellor Paulton	5,784	68.9	
Conservative	Eli Waddington	2,607	31.1	
Majority		3,177	37.8	
Turnout		8,391	74.6	
Liberal hold		Swing		

=== Elections in the 1880s ===
General election 1886: Bishop Auckland
Party	Candidate	Votes	%	±%
Liberal	James Mellor Paulton	Unopposed		
Liberal hold				

Wyvill

General election 1885: Bishop Auckland
Party	Candidate	Votes	%	±%
Liberal	James Mellor Paulton	5,907	72.2	
Conservative	Marmaduke D'Arcy Wyvill	2,280	27.8	
Majority		3,627	44.4	
Turnout		8,187	83.0	
Liberal win (new seat)				

== See also ==
- List of parliamentary constituencies in County Durham
- List of parliamentary constituencies in North East England (region)
- History of parliamentary constituencies and boundaries in Durham
- Bishop Auckland by-election, 1929

== Sources ==
- Craig, F. W. S. (1983) [1969]. British parliamentary election results 1918–1949 (3rd ed.). Chichester: Parliamentary Research Services. ISBN 0-900178-06-X.
