= Health Protection (Coronavirus, Restrictions) (Entry to Venues and Events) (England) Regulations 2021 =

United Kingdom emergency legislation

- Statutory Instrument
- Parliament of the United Kingdom
- Citation: SI 2021/1416
- Introduced by: Secretary of State for Health and Social Care
- Territorial extent: England

Dates
- Made: 13 December 2021
- Laid before Parliament: 13 December 2021
- Commencement: 15 December 2021
- Expired: 26 January 2022

Other legislation
- Made under: Public Health (Control of Disease) Act 1984

Status: Expired

Text of the Health Protection (Coronavirus, Restrictions) (Entry to Venues and Events) (England) Regulations 2021 as in force today (including any amendments) within the United Kingdom, from legislation.gov.uk.

The Health Protection (Coronavirus, Restrictions) (Entry to Venues and Events) (England) Regulations 2021 (SI 2021/1416) is a statutory instrument (SI) made on 13 December 2021 in response to the COVID-19 pandemic. The regulations, which covered England only, were introduced following increasing concerns about the Omicron variant. They mostly came into effect on 15 December 2021 and expired on 26 January 2022.

The regulations applied to nightclubs and some other high-risk venues, as well as to larger venues and events hosting more than 500 people. Organisers were required to bar access to members of the public who could not demonstrate their valid COVID-19 status via the NHS COVID Pass or with official confirmation of a recent test result. A valid status required the holder to be vaccinated with two doses at least 14 days earlier, or to have taken a PCR or lateral flow test within the last 48 hours with negative result.

Under 18s were exempt, as were people attending in order to provide a service or to sell goods, and those who could not be vaccinated for medical reasons.

== Legal basis ==
The regulations were introduced by way of a statutory instrument made by the Secretary of State for Health and Social Care using emergency powers available under the Public Health (Control of Disease) Act 1984. The regulations themselves stated the legal basis for using such powers, namely "the serious and imminent threat to public health which is posed by the incidence and spread of severe acute respiratory syndrome coronavirus 2 (SARS-CoV-2) in England"; the restrictions were said to be "proportionate to what they seek to achieve, which is a public health response to the threat."

== Commencement and geographical scope ==
The regulations applied in England only (the rules were different in Scotland, Wales and Northern Ireland). They mostly came into effect on 15 December 2021, though some amending regulations (not discussed here) came into effect the day before.

== Restrictions on entry ==
The regulations restricted entry into certain venues, and into certain types of event. Restricted venues were called Category A venues, and the restricted events divided up into categories B, C and D, as defined in the Restricted venues and events section below.

The person responsible for the restricted venue or event was required to check attendees' COVID-19 status, and they had to generally permit access only to those whose status was valid. Exempt persons could also be admitted, as could those who could prove they were participating in a clinical trial or that they could not be vaccinated for medical reasons.

=== Valid COVID-19 status ===
'Valid' COVID-19 status meant:

- vaccinated with two doses of an approved vaccine (or one of the single-dose Janssen vaccine) at least 14 days earlier; or
- having taken a PCR or lateral flow test within the last 48 hours, with negative result

The status could be proved by means of:

- the NHS COVID Pass, or an approved UK or international equivalent
- the EU Digital COVID certificate
- a North American Certificate
- a valid text or email confirmation of the recent test result.

=== Spot checks ===
Generally, all attendees had to have their COVID-19 status individually checked, but where many attendees were expected to arrive at the same time and the resultant crowd would present a safety or security risk, the organiser was able to apply to the local authority for permission to check some proportion of the attendees only.

== Restricted venues and events ==
Category of venue or event	Details	Exemptions
Category A venue	Nightclubs, dance halls, discos, and other licensed venues providing music for dancing at night, regardless of the number of attendees	Where the venue was hosting dance classes, dance exercise classes, ballroom dancing, dance performances or rehearsals; or an outdoor event attended by fewer than 4000 people; or where the event was exempt
Category A venue	A private dwelling that provided alcohol and music for dancing at night as part of a ticketed or charged-for event, regardless of the number of attendees	A private dwelling that hosted a free non-ticketed event, even if alcohol and music for dancing at night were provided
Category A venue	Indoor theatres, concert halls and music venues (hosting live music or theatre) where more than 500 people were expected to stand or move around	Where a specific event at the venue was attended by fewer than 500 people at one time
Category A venue	Indoor public halls and conference centres where more than 500 people were expected to stand or move around	Where a specific event at the venue was attended by fewer than 500 people at one time
Category A venue	Sports stadia, arenas, centres, pools, rinks and sports grounds where people were expected to stand or move around: indoors: 500 or more; outdoors: 4000 or more	Where a specific event at the venue was attended by fewer than 500 people (indoors) or 4000 (outdoors) at one time
Category A venue	All large venues capable of holding 10,000 people	Where a specific event at the venue was attended by fewer than 10,000 people at one time
Category B event	Events of at least 500 people taking place at least partly indoors within a vessel, where attendees were likely to stand or move around	
Category C event	Events of at least 4000 people without assigned seats, taking place at least partly outdoors, where attendees were likely to stand or move around	
Category D event	All events of at least 10,000 people without assigned seats	

In these definitions:

- An attendee who left their seat only to use the toilet facilities, to eat or drink, or to leave, was not treated as 'moving around'
- People who had attended in order to provide services or to sell goods were generally not included in the counts.

== Exempt events ==
Certain types of event were exempt, and were not subject to the restrictions. Not all exemptions applied to all categories of venue and event. The table below summarises the exemptions and gives the categories to which each applied:

Exempt event	Applies to (categories)
Marriage or civil partnership ceremony	All
Reception following a wedding, civil ceremony or significant life event	A (up to 500 people only); B and C (if not organised by a business, charity or public body)
Funeral	All
Commemoration of the life of a person who has died	All (apart from nightclubs and the like)
Communal worship	All
Event in a private dwelling	B, C and D (apart from paid-for or ticketed events)
Event in a restaurant, cafe, bar, pub or club	B, C and D (apart from paid-for or ticketed events, or where the venue has been hired or reserved)
Free non-ticketed event taking place in a publicly-accessible outdoor space	A, C and D

== Exempt persons ==
Certain classes of people were exempt from the restrictions on entry. They included:

- anyone under 18
- anyone at the venue or event in order to provide services or to sell goods
- anyone participating in organised sport or fitness activity
- police officers and various others attending in an official capacity.

== Local authority powers ==
Local authorities were given the power to enforce the regulations via Coronavirus Improvement Notices and Coronavirus Immediate Restriction Notices.

== Offences and penalties ==
Breach of the regulations could result in the issuance of a fixed penalty notice (with penalties on a sliding scale of up to £10,000), or prosecution.

== Expiry ==
The bulk of regulations expired at the end of 26 January 2022.

== House of Commons vote ==
On 14 December 2021, the day before the majority of the provisions were due to enter into force, the government allowed a vote in the House of Commons. The regulations were approved, in spite of a rebellion by more than a quarter of Conservative MPs, who objected to these further restrictions. This was the largest rebellion of Conservative MPs against any proposal made during the Premiership of Boris Johnson; however the measures were still passed due to the support of Labour MPs. The split of the vote on the regulations was as follows:

Vote on COVID Pass Regulations
Ballot →	Whole House	Conservatives	Labour	Other Parties
Yes	369 / 649 (57%)	226 / 360 (63%)	142 / 198 (72%)	1 / 91 (1%)
No	126 / 649 (19%)	99 / 360 (28%)	8 / 198 (4%)	19 / 91 (21%)
No Vote Recorded	154 / 649 (24%)	35 / 360 (10%)	48 / 198 (24%)	71 / 91 (78%)

== List of amendments by date ==
Amendments
SI No.	Amend. No.	Made	Effective from	Summary of major changes	Link
2021/1435	–	14 Dec	15 Dec	Corrected errors in main regulations	

== Bibliography ==
- "SI 1416". Legislation.gov.uk. 14 December 2021. The Health Protection (Coronavirus, Restrictions) (Entry to Venues and Events) (England) Regulations 2021. Text was copied from this source, which is available under an Open Government Licence v3.0. © Crown copyright
- "SI 1435". Legislation.gov.uk. 15 December 2021. The Health Protection (Coronavirus, Restrictions) (Entry to Venues and Events) (England) (Amendment) Regulations 2021.
