= Sam Rushworth =

British politician (born 1984)

Sam Rushworth MP
- Official portrait, 2026

Member of Parliament for Bishop Auckland
- Incumbent
- Assumed office 4 July 2024
- Preceded by: Dehenna Davison
- Majority: 6,672 (16.5%)

Personal details
- Born: 1984 (age 41–42)
- Party: Labour
- Education: University of Manchester; University of East Anglia
- Occupation: Politician
- Website: https://www.samrushworth.co.uk/

Samuel Jonathan Rushworth (born 1984) is a British Labour Party politician who has served as the Member of Parliament (MP) for Bishop Auckland since 2024. He previously worked in international development.

== Early life and education ==
Rushworth was raised in Blackpool and educated at Hodgson High School in Poulton-le-Fylde. He attended the University of Manchester, where he earned a Bachelor of Arts (BA) degree in economics and social studies, specialising in development economics, and a Master of Arts (MA) degree in international development with emphases in poverty, conflict, and reconstruction. He holds a diploma in Advanced Business French from the Chambre de Commerce et d'Industrie de Paris and a Master of Research (MRes) degree in education and international development from the University of East Anglia, where he later completed his PhD. His doctoral thesis included a study of youth experiences in the Rwandan education system.

== Early career ==
Rushworth's career has centred on international development and education. He founded Our World Research & Consultancy Ltd, providing strategic advice and research services on global development issues. While working as a consultant, he served as Head of Strategy at Aegis Trust, an organisation dedicated to the prevention of genocide and mass atrocities. In this position, he authored a teacher guidebook on integrating social and emotional learning and critical thinking into Rwandan classroom teaching methods. In 2017, Rushworth co-founded African Dreams Ltd, a not-for-profit organisation in Rwanda supporting youth-led charities and youth employment.

Rushworth served as a Project Manager for Stockport Council and later as a Volunteering and Training Manager for the British Red Cross while completing his master's degrees. While completing his PhD, Rushworth served as an associate tutor at the University of East Anglia, a lecturer at Macclesfield College, a secondary school teacher in Rwanda, and as a Youth Club Manager at the Hamlet Centre, a charity supporting young people and adults with disabilities. Prior to becoming an MP, he was the Programme Manager for the Strategic Research Fund at Durham University, where he oversaw research funding initiatives.

== Political career ==
Rushworth stood in the seats of Blackpool North and Cleveleys in 2015 and Tatton in 2017.

He was selected as the Labour Party's prospective parliamentary candidate for Bishop Auckland in 2022, a previously 'Red Wall' seat, but one of many that fell to the Conservatives at the 2019 General Election in 2022. He successfully contested the seat in the 2024 general election, winning 17,036 votes, or 42.1% of the overall vote, with a majority of 6,672. He was also the chair of Bishop Auckland Constituency Labour Party.

He has served on the executive board of the Labour Campaign for International Development (LCID) and is known for his advocacy on issues including child poverty.

He is a member of the International Development Select Committee, and chairs the T-levels All-party parliamentary group (APPG), as well as being co-chair of the Men and Boy's Issues APPG, and a vice chair of the Rural Services and Climate Nature and Security APPGs.

He voted against the Terminally Ill Adults (end of life) Bill, which would legalise assisted dying in the UK at both second and third reading.

In May 2025, a man was sentenced to one and half years in prison for repeatedly threatening to kill him, in comments referred to by the judge at sentencing as "vile." The man later died in prison, with Rushworth sending condolences.

In July 2025 he was one of 127 MPs who signed the reasoned amendment protesting against the Universal Credit and PIP Bill, before ultimately voting for the legislation after concessions were made by the Government, including the cancellation of any immediate changes to PIP.

In February 2026 he voted with the Government to remove the two-child limit on Universal Credit.

== Personal life ==
Rushworth is married to Siobhain, a midwife in the NHS. They have five children. He is a member of the Church of Jesus Christ of Latter-day Saints and has worked with the church to promote religious freedom and bring delegations of women and youth from countries affected by interfaith conflict to Parliament.

During the COVID-19 pandemic, Rushworth and his family walked from coast to coast to raise funds for Children North East, a charity supporting disadvantaged children.

He has claimed that his grandmother died as a result of the Infected Blood Scandal.

Rushworth is fluent in French.

Parliament of the United Kingdom
Preceded by Dehenna Davison	Member of Parliament for Bishop Auckland; 2024–present	Incumbent
