= Blackwell Grange =

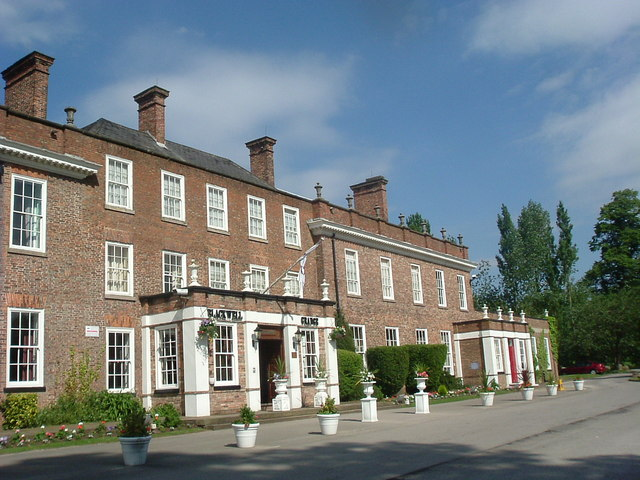
Blackwell Grange Hotel

== Family & Building History ==
The Allan family who populate the story of Blackwell Grange Hotel trace their ancestry back in an uninterrupted line of descent from Henry Allan of Buckenhall in the county of Staffordshire in the year 1290. George Allan bought Blackwell Grange from Thomas Hill in 1693. It included an ‘estate and handsome mansion house’ which the Hill family owned. George added the south wing between 1717 and 1722 to welcome back his eldest son George and his new wife Thomasine Prescott from their honeymoon. George died in 1753 and Blackwell Grange passed into the ownership of their daughter Ann Allan. History was understandably kind to this ‘Good Miss Allan’. After her death at the age of 68 in 1785, the local newspapers reported just why her death deserved to be lamented: "Possessed of an ample fortune, she dispensed blessings to all around her. Wherever she heard of misery or distress, her heart and hand were opened to alleviate them."

Ann left her properties to her cousin, James Allan. Born in 1712, he was the fourteenth and only surviving son of Nicholas, the youngest brother of the George Allan who had first acquired the land on which Blackwell Grange was built. James had more than a passing interest in things historical, as did his son, yet another George Allan, born in 1736 and known as ‘The Antiquary’, who was Blackwell's next owner. For most of their lives these two collected material to chronicle the county's history. The collection remained at Blackwell Grange until it was sold in 1822 to the Literary and Philosophical Society of Newcastle upon Tyne for £400 and went on to form the basis of Newcastle's Hancock Museum. After the death of George ‘The Antiquary’ in 1800, his son, also George, born in 1767, inherited from him property worth £5,000 a year. This George Allan was an MP from 1813 to 1818.

Sir Henry Havelock inherited the Blackwell estates in 1880 on the death of his cousin, Henry Allan and on inheriting the great house, he applied for a Royal Licence to add ‘Allan’ to his own name. Perhaps the best-known of the Havelock-Allan baronets was the 4th, Sir Anthony Havelock-Allan. Born on the Blackwell Estate at Darlington in 1904, he is best-remembered as a brilliant film producer who co founded Cine Guilds and whose early works include Brief Encounter, In Which We serve, and Great Expectations whose later works included Peter Collinson's Up the Junction of 1968, Franco Zeffirelli's Romeo and Juliet and David Lean's Ryan's Daughter.

From 1880 to 1953 Blackwell Grange was owned by the Havelock-Allan family. In 1954, the Grange's furniture and furnishings were sold by auction and, in 1955, Darlington Corporation bought the Blackwell Grange property for £37,320 and it became one of the sites of Darlington College of Technology, now Darlington College. In 1971 Blackwell Grange was acquired under a long lease by Grand Metropolitan and the property opened as a hotel in 1972. The hotel was soon making national and international headlines when it was selected as the venue for a conference, hosted by Northern Ireland Secretary William Whitelaw, to try to end the Northern Ireland conflict.

After several changes of ownership Blackwell Grange is now in the hands of Bruhenny Hotels which embarked on a refurbishment programme in 2018 to restore the grand house to its former glory.

== The Tartan Lady ==
King George II's son William Augustus, the Duke of Cumberland, had spent a night at Blackwell Grange in 1745 on his way to Scotland to fight the Battle of Culloden and then a second night there in 1746 on his way back south. On this return visit, the King's son is said to have brought with him a thank-you gift from Scotland for his Darlington hosts. The story goes that he presented the original oil painting known as The Tartan Lady to Blackwell Grange. This painting adorned the stairs at Blackwell Grange for centuries but due to its ‘ghostly associations’ it was removed and lost to the property. However, photographs of the original painting were available which facilitated the reproduction of a replica oil painting of The Tartan Lady, which now proudly hangs in the hotel's reception.
