= 1929 Bishop Auckland by-election =

UK parliamentary by-election

The 1929 Bishop Auckland by-election was a parliamentary by-election held on 7 February 1929 for the British House of Commons constituency of Bishop Auckland in County Durham.

The seat had become vacant on 22 December 1928 when the constituency's Labour Member of Parliament (MP), Ben Spoor had died aged 50. He had been elected for the previously Liberal-held seat at the 1918 general election, and held it through three further general elections.

== Candidates ==
Spoor had planned to retire at the next general election, and the Bishop Auckland Constituency Labour Party had selected Hugh Dalton as its prospective parliamentary candidate. However, Dalton was already MP for the then-marginal Peckham constituency in South London, and had sought a safer seat. He would have had to resign his Peckham seat to stand in Bishop Auckland. To add to the complications, even if he had been minded to do that, a further complication was that the prospective Labour candidate for Peckham was John Beckett, the sitting MP for Gateshead.

To avoid triggering two further by-elections, a Labour candidate was needed who would agree to stand down at the next general election. The seventy members of Bishop Auckland Constituency Labour Party's general committee unanimously chose Hugh Dalton's wife Ruth, because she could be relied on to resign in favour of her husband as soon as Parliament was dissolved; no other candidate was even considered.

The Liberal Party candidate was Aaron Curry, who had contested Houghton-le-Spring at the 1923 and 1924 general elections, and who had also been unsuccessful at the Wallsend by-election in 1926. The Conservative Party, which had not contested Bishop Auckland in 1924, selected as its candidate H. Thompson, who had not previously contested a Parliamentary election.

== Result ==
On a slightly reduced turnout, Ruth Dalton held the seat for Labour, becoming the thirteenth woman elected to the House of Commons. Her share of the vote was slightly increased over Spoor's 1924 result, but a majority greatly increased by the division of the non-Labour vote between two candidates.

== Aftermath ==
Ruth Dalton stood down as agreed at the general election in May 1929, having been the shortest-serving woman MP. Her 92 days in office remains an unbeaten record, but it was equalled 45 years later by Margo McDonald, the Scottish National Party MP for Glasgow Govan from 8 November 1973 to 8 February 1974. She did not stand for Parliament again.

Her husband Hugh won the seat at the 1929 election, with Curry again in second place, but when Labour split two years later and Ramsay MacDonald formed a National Government, Curry took the seat at the 1931 general election. Dalton regained the seat in 1935, and held it until he stood down in 1959.

Bishop Auckland by-election, 7 February 1929
Party	Candidate	Votes	%	±%
Labour	Ruth Dalton	14,797	57.1	+2.0
Liberal	Aaron Curry	7,725	29.9	−15.0
Conservative	Herbert Thompson	3,357	13.0	New
Majority		7,072	27.2	+17.0
Turnout		25,879	74.4	−6.5
Labour hold		Swing	+8.5	

== See also ==
- Bishop Auckland constituency
- The town of Bishop Auckland
- List of United Kingdom by-elections (1918–1931)
