= Aaron Curry (politician) =

English politician (1887–1957)

Aaron Charlton Curry
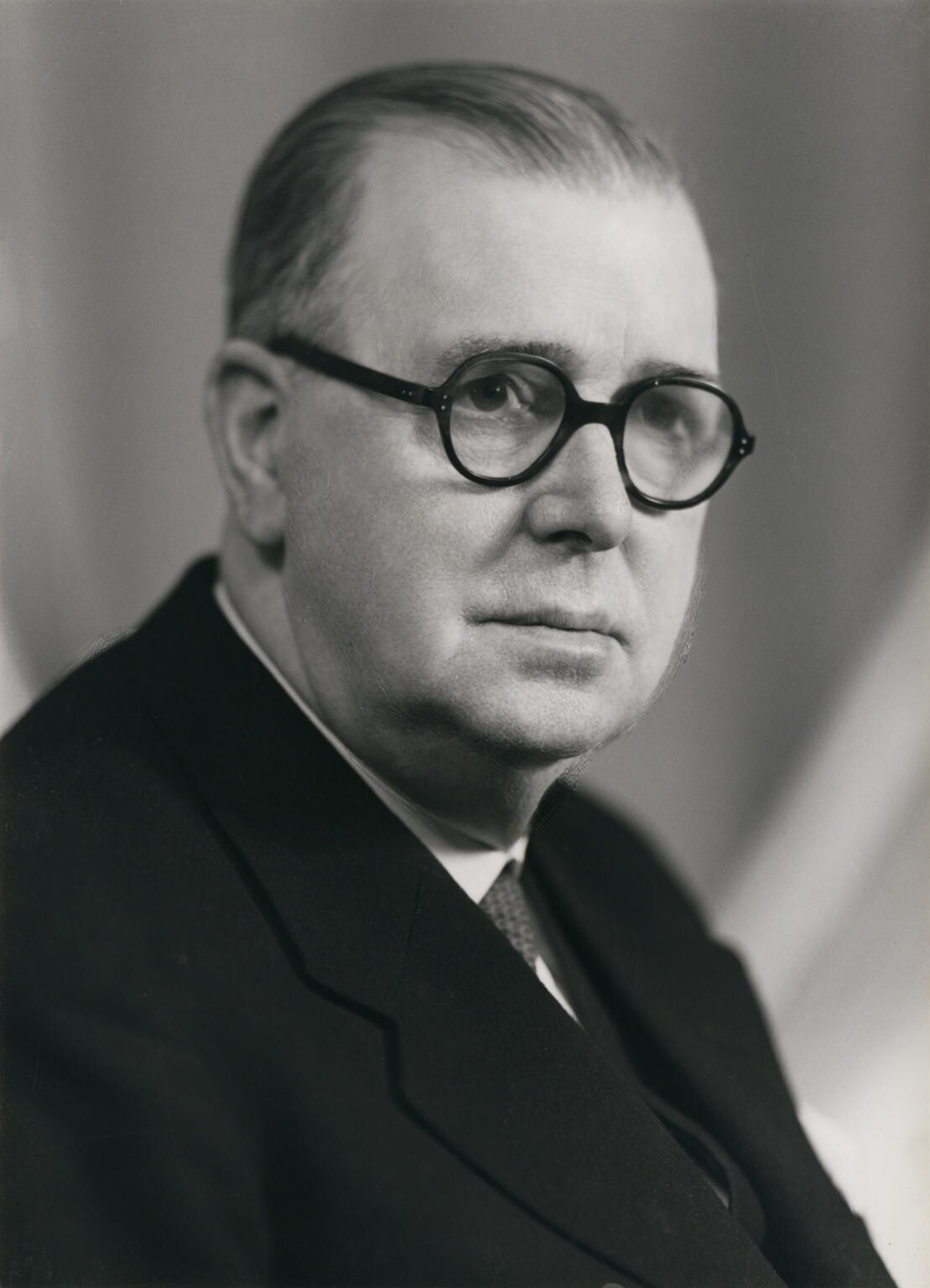
- Curry in 1950

Member of Parliament for Bishop Auckland
- In office 27 October 1931 – 25 October 1935
- Preceded by: Hugh Dalton
- Succeeded by: Hugh Dalton

Personal details
- Born: 17 August 1888 Newcastle, England
- Died: 6 January 1957 (aged 68) Newcastle, England
- Party: Liberal
- Spouse: Jane Cranston Wilson
- Children: one daughter
- Occupation: Accountant, politician

Aaron Charlton Curry DCL (Hon.), JP, FRSA (17 August 1887 – 6 January 1957) was a Liberal Party, and briefly Liberal National, politician in the United Kingdom.

== Background ==
Curry married Jane Cranston Wilson in 1913 and they had one daughter. Hon. DCL (Dunelm), 1951.

== Career ==
Curry was a founder and formerly senior partner in A. C. Curry & Co., chartered accountants. He was a Fellow of the Corporation of Accountants. He was a Fellow Corporation of Certified Secretaries. He was Director of H. Young (Motors) Ltd, Norbrit Products, Ltd and other Companies.

== Political career ==
=== Parliamentary ===
Standing as a Liberal candidate at the 1923 and 1924 general elections, Curry unsuccessfully contested the Houghton-le-Spring constituency. He was defeated again at the Wallsend by-election in 1926, and in Bishop Auckland at a by-election in 1929 and at the 1929 general election. He was elected to the House of Commons on his sixth attempt, at the 1931 general election, when he stood as a Liberal National candidate for Bishop Auckland, defeating the sitting Labour Member of Parliament (MP) Hugh Dalton. Although he took the Liberal National whip after the 1931 election, he consistently voted with the official Liberal Party in Commons votes. His support for free trade and opposition to the government's proposed tariffs being a major reason. In December 1932, Curry left the Liberal Nationals and took the Liberal whip. He stood as a Liberal candidate at the 1935 general election, when Dalton regained the seat. Curry did not stand for Parliament again.

=== Municipal ===
He was a member of Whickham Urban District Council from 1931 to 1937. He was a member of Newcastle upon Tyne City Council; Councillor 1941-51 and Alderman 1951–57. Lord Mayor of the City and County of Newcastle upon Tyne, 1949–50 and again 1956–57. He was Chairman of Northumberland and Tyneside River Board. He was a Justice of the Peace for County Durham. He was a Justice of the Peace for the County Borough of Newcastle upon Tyne.

=== Electoral record ===
General election 1923: Houghton-le-Spring
| Party | Candidate | Votes | % | ±% |
|---|---|---|---|---|
| Labour | Robert Richardson | 15,225 | 59.3 | +7.4 |
| Liberal | Aaron Curry | 10,445 | 40.7 | +19.5 |
| Majority | | 4,780 | 18.6 | −6.4 |
| Turnout | | 25,670 | 69.0 | −9.4 |
| Registered electors | | 37,224 | | |
| Labour hold | | Swing | −6.1 | |

General election 1924: Houghton-le-Spring
| Party | Candidate | Votes | % | ±% |
|---|---|---|---|---|
| Labour | Robert Richardson | 17,857 | 57.8 | −1.5 |
| Liberal | Aaron Curry | 13,023 | 42.2 | +1.5 |
| Majority | | 4,834 | 15.6 | −3.0 |
| Turnout | | 30,880 | 79.6 | +10.6 |
| Registered electors | | 38,779 | | |
| Labour hold | | Swing | −1.5 | |

1926 Wallsend by-election
| Party | Candidate | Votes | % | ±% |
|---|---|---|---|---|
| Labour | Margaret Bondfield | 18,866 | 57.7 | +5.3 |
| Unionist | Sam Howard | 9,839 | 30.1 | −17.5 |
| Liberal | Aaron Curry | 4,000 | 12.2 | n/a |
| Majority | | 9,027 | 27.6 | +22.8 |
| Turnout | | 32,705 | 82.9 | −2.5 |
| Registered electors | | 39,460 | | |
| Labour hold | | Swing | +11.4 | |

1929 Bishop Auckland by-election
| Party | Candidate | Votes | % | ±% |
|---|---|---|---|---|
| Labour | Ruth Dalton | 14,797 | 57.1 | +2.0 |
| Liberal | Aaron Curry | 7,725 | 29.9 | −15.0 |
| Unionist | Herbert Thompson | 3,357 | 13.0 | n/a |
| Majority | | 7,072 | 27.2 | +17.0 |
| Turnout | | 25,879 | 74.4 | −6.5 |
| Registered electors | | 34,787 | | |
| Labour hold | | Swing | +8.5 | |

General election 1929: Bishop Auckland
| Party | Candidate | Votes | % | ±% |
|---|---|---|---|---|
| Labour | Hugh Dalton | 17,838 | 55.8 | −1.3 |
| Liberal | Aaron Curry | 9,635 | 30.1 | +0.2 |
| Unionist | Herbert Thompson | 4,503 | 14.1 | +1.1 |
| Majority | | 8,203 | 25.7 | −1.5 |
| Turnout | | 31,976 | 76.5 | +2.1 |
| Registered electors | | 41,772 | | |
| Labour hold | | Swing | -0.8 | |

General election 1931: Bishop Auckland
| Party | Candidate | Votes | % | ±% |
|---|---|---|---|---|
| National Liberal | Aaron Curry | 17,551 | 51.4 | +21.3 |
| Labour | Hugh Dalton | 16,796 | 48.6 | −7.2 |
| Majority | | 955 | 2.8 | 28.5 |
| Turnout | | 34,547 | 82.5 | +6.0 |
| National Liberal gain from Labour | | Swing | +14.2 | |

General election 1935: Bishop Auckland
| Party | Candidate | Votes | % | ±% |
|---|---|---|---|---|
| Labour | Hugh Dalton | 20,481 | 62.3 | +13.7 |
| Liberal | Aaron Curry | 12,395 | 37.7 | −13.7 |
| Majority | | 8,086 | 24.6 | 27.4 |
| Turnout | | 32,876 | 79.2 | −3.3 |
| Labour gain from Liberal | | Swing | +13.7 | |

Parliament of the United Kingdom
| Preceded by Hugh Dalton | Member of Parliament for Bishop Auckland; 1931–1935 | Succeeded by Hugh Dalton |
