= Hugh Dalton =

British politician (1887–1962)

The Right Honourable The Lord Dalton PC
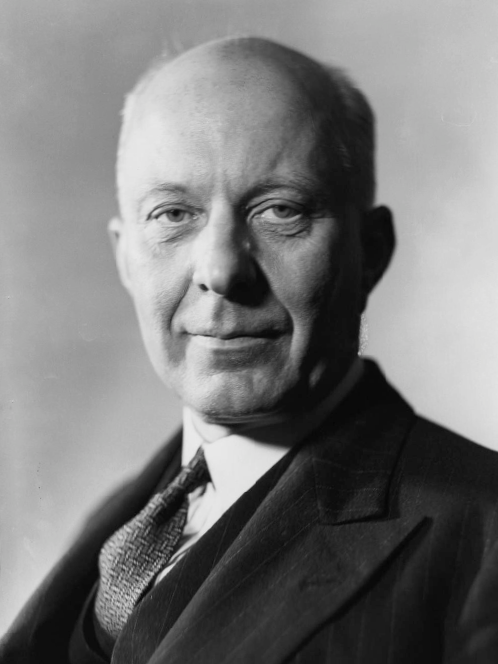
- Dalton in 1940

Chancellor of the Duchy of Lancaster
- In office 31 May 1948 – 28 February 1950
- Prime Minister: Clement Attlee
- Preceded by: The Lord Pakenham
- Succeeded by: The Viscount Alexander of Hillsborough

Chancellor of the Exchequer
- In office 27 July 1945 – 13 November 1947
- Prime Minister: Clement Attlee
- Preceded by: John Anderson
- Succeeded by: Stafford Cripps

President of the Board of Trade
- In office 22 February 1942 – 23 May 1945
- Prime Minister: Winston Churchill
- Preceded by: John Llewellin
- Succeeded by: Oliver Lyttelton

Minister of Economic Warfare
- In office 15 May 1940 – 22 February 1942
- Prime Minister: Winston Churchill
- Preceded by: Ronald Cross
- Succeeded by: Roundell Palmer

Chairman of the Labour Party
- In office 9 October 1936 – 8 October 1937
- Leader: Clement Attlee
- Preceded by: Jennie Adamson
- Succeeded by: George Dallas

Parliamentary Under-Secretary of State for Foreign Affairs
- In office 11 June 1929 – 3 September 1931
- Prime Minister: Ramsay MacDonald
- Preceded by: Anthony Eden
- Succeeded by: James Stanhope

Member of the House of Lords Lord Temporal
- In office 28 January 1960 – 13 February 1962; Life Peerage

Member of Parliament for Bishop Auckland
- In office 14 November 1935 – 18 September 1959
- Preceded by: Aaron Curry
- Succeeded by: James Boyden
- In office 30 May 1929 – 7 October 1931
- Preceded by: Ruth Dalton
- Succeeded by: Aaron Curry

Member of Parliament for Peckham
- In office 29 October 1924 – 10 May 1929
- Preceded by: Collingwood Hughes
- Succeeded by: John Beckett

Personal details
- Born: 26 August 1887 Neath, Wales
- Died: 13 February 1962 (aged 74)
- Party: Labour
- Education: King's College, Cambridge, London School of Economics

Edward Hugh John Neale Dalton, Baron Dalton, PC (16 August 1887 – 13 February 1962) was a British Labour Party economist and politician who served as Chancellor of the Exchequer from 1945 to 1947. He shaped Labour Party foreign policy in the 1930s, opposing pacifism; promoting rearmament against the German threat; and strongly opposing the appeasement policy of Prime Minister Neville Chamberlain in 1938. Dalton served in Winston Churchill's wartime coalition cabinet; following the Dunkirk evacuation he was Minister of Economic Warfare, and established the Special Operations Executive. Later in the war he was President of the Board of Trade. As Chancellor in Clement Attlee's Labour Government, he pushed his policy of cheap money too hard, and mishandled the sterling crisis of 1947, in which much of the 1946 Anglo-American loan was wasted. His political position was already in jeopardy in 1947 when he was forced to resign for, seemingly inadvertently, revealing a sentence of the budget to a reporter minutes before delivering his official budget speech. Dalton later returned to the cabinet in multiple relatively minor positions.

== Early life ==
Hugh Dalton was born in Neath in South Wales. His father, John Neale Dalton, was a Church of England clergyman who became chaplain to Queen Victoria, tutor to the princes Albert Victor and his younger brother George (later King George V), and a canon of Windsor.

Dalton was educated at Summer Fields School and then at Eton College. He then went to King's College, Cambridge, where he was active in student politics; his socialist views, then very rare amongst undergraduates, earned him the nickname "Comrade Hugh". Whilst at Cambridge he was President of the Cambridge University Fabian Society. He did not succeed in becoming President of the Cambridge Union Society, despite three attempts to be elected Secretary. At Cambridge, Dalton was especially close to Rupert Brooke whom he met on his first day as an undergraduate and about whom he wrote in the 1950s that "the radiance of his memory still lights my path". Dalton's decision as an undergraduate to join the Labour Party gave him the reputation of being a "class traitor" and an "Etonian renegade" who had abandoned the traditional "Establishment" values of his Eton-Cambridge education; many Conservatives of similar public school and Oxbridge background always had a special distaste for him. Dalton came from a deeply Anglican Tory family devoted to what later generations would call "one nation Conservatism" who instilled into him the idea that members of the British elite had a duty to the nation to serve the greater good by using their talents. He did not see his conversion to socialism as a betrayal of his background as his critics alleged, but rather a continuation; he claimed that socialism was merely the more efficient system at obtaining the greater good for ordinary people.

He went on to study at the London School of Economics (LSE) and the Middle Temple. During the First World War he was called up into the Army Service Corps, later transferring to the Royal Artillery in January 1917. He served as a lieutenant on the French and Italian fronts, where he was awarded the Italian decoration, the Medaglia di Bronzo al Valor Militare, in recognition of his "contempt for danger" during the retreat from Caporetto; he later wrote a memoir of the war called With British Guns in Italy. Dalton's military service was the formative event of his youth. Dalton later wrote: "I am of that generation which during the Great War was massacred in droves upon the battlefields. Like many millions of others, I served in the Army and unlike most of the best friends of my youth I survived the war. It was my beliefs that politics, rightly handled, can put an end to war, which more than anything else, drew me into the active life of politics when the war was over." Unlike many others involved in the Labour Party in the interwar period, Dalton was no pacifist, and instead embraced the idea that collective security and armed deterrence were the best means of avoiding another world war. Following demobilisation, he returned to the LSE and the University of London as a lecturer, where he was awarded a DSc (hence his title "Dr Dalton") for a thesis on the principles of public finance in 1920.

== Political career ==
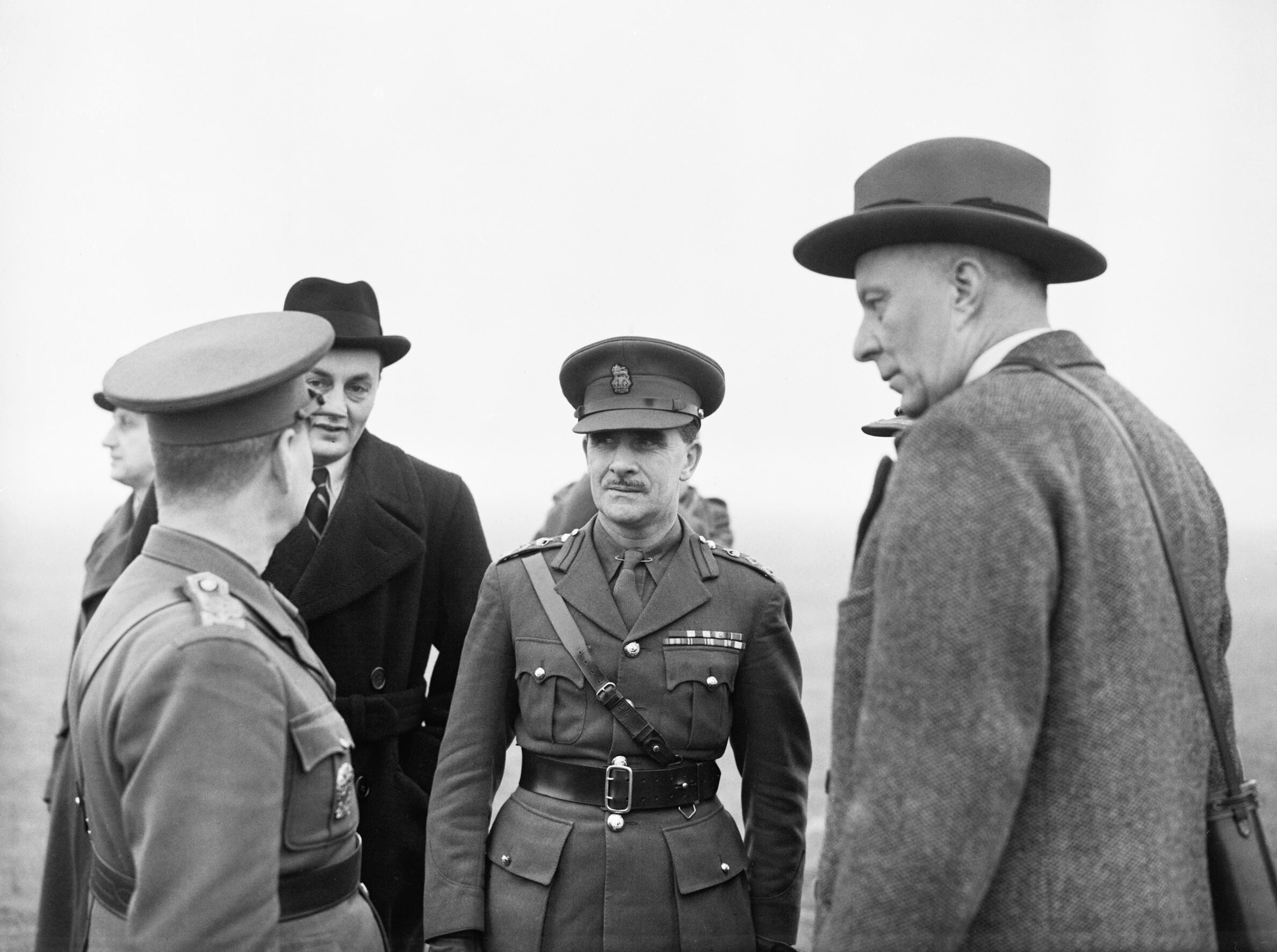
Dalton (right), Minister of Economic Warfare, and Colin Gubbins, chief of the Special Operations Executive, talking to a Czech officer during a visit to Czech troops near Leamington Spa, Warwickshire

Dalton stood unsuccessfully for Parliament four times: at the 1922 Cambridge by-election, in Maidstone at the 1922 general election, in Cardiff East at the 1923 general election, and the 1924 Holland with Boston by-election, before entering Parliament for Peckham at the 1924 general election.

Dalton was unusual amongst Labour MPs, most of whom felt very strongly that the Treaty of Versailles was too harsh towards Germany, and who advocated revising the treaty in favour of Germany. Dalton's war experiences in the First World War had made him something of a Germanphobe. In 1926, he visited Poland and discovered that in the disputed regions of Upper Silesia and the Polish Corridor that German and Polish populations were hopelessly geographically mixed with no clear-cut geographical lines between the two quarrelling communities. As such, Dalton concluded that returning Upper Silesia and the Polish Corridor to Germany would not solve the German-Polish dispute as all that would do would be to transfer Poles into Germany just as transferring Upper Silesia and the Polish Corridor had transferred Germans into Poland. Dalton argued that "wholesale transfers of population" were the only way to achieve "perfection" because otherwise there would always be communities of Poles or Germans on the "wrong" side of the frontier. At the time, Dalton rejected this course and urged the "obliteration" of frontiers between Germany and Poland as the best way of securing peace in Europe, arguing for some sort of German-Polish federation. He recalled about his visit to Poland: "I came away aware for the first time of this most gifted and romantic nation, so brave, so gay, with so much good looks and personal charm in both sexes...It was this visit that finally determined me to try to rewrite the foreign policy of the Labour Party". Dalton wrote the prevailing viewpoint in the Labour Party in the 1920s was "...a silly syllogism 'Everything that came out of the Allied victory in the war and the Treaty of Versailles is bad. Poland came out of all that. Therefore Poland is bad'. But few of these "experts" had ever visited Poland or met typical Poles". Dalton was very interested in Eastern Europe and maintained close ties with the Polish Socialist Party. In his 1928 book Towards the Peace of Nations, Dalton praised the forced population exchanges between Turkey and Greece in 1922–1923 for their "cumulatively good" consequences, and recommended a similar policy towards Eastern Europe.

Dalton was regarded in the 1920s as a protégé of Arthur Henderson and like Henderson, he supported the League of Nations, which he saw as an organisation that would promote free trade, disarmament, and arbitration of international disputes. There was a notable contradiction within the Labour Party in the interwar period between its support for disarmament vs. support for collective security, which implied a willingness to go to war against an aggressor state. Dalton was one of the first Labour leaders to confront the contradiction, which led him to choose collective security over disarmament. Other Labour leaders such as Ramsay MacDonald and Arthur Ponsonby preferred disarmament or to gloss over the contradiction by claiming that support for collective security would automatically lead to disarmament. In Towards the Peace of Nations, Dalton argued that if the League of Nations should invoke military sanctions against a state that had committed aggression, then Britain should go to war, which led him to argue the British military should not be abolished or sharply reduced as others in the Labour Party wanted.

Widely respected for his intellectual achievements in economics, Dalton rose in the Labour Party's ranks, with election in 1925 to the shadow cabinet and, with strong union backing, to the Labour Party National Executive Committee (NEC). At the 1929 general election, he succeeded his wife Ruth Dalton, who retired, as Labour Member of Parliament (MP) for Bishop Auckland. He gained ministerial and foreign policy experience as Under-Secretary at the Foreign Office in Ramsay MacDonald's second government, between 1929 and 1931. Starting in 1930, Dalton became a Zionist and strongly supported seeing the Palestine Mandate (modern Israel) ultimately becoming a Jewish state. Most Zionists at the time were socialist, and Dalton in a 1930 speech predicated a future Israeli state would be a "socialist commonwealth". As undersecretary, he clashed with the Foreign Secretary, Arthur Henderson, who favoured returning the Polish Corridor and Upper Silesia to Germany. Dalton wrote in 1940 that "there was no reason why we should back German claims against Poland, and that moreover, it could not be in British interests to aggrandise at Poland's expense a Germany, which had been and might become again, what Poland could never be, a grim menace to this country". He lost this position as under-secretary when he, and most Labour leaders, rejected MacDonald's National Government. As with most other Labour MPs, he lost his seat in 1931; he was elected again in 1935.

Dalton published Practical Socialism for Britain, a bold and highly influential assessment of a future Labour government's policy options, in 1935. The book revived updated nuts-and-bolts Fabianism, which had been out of favour, and could be used to attack the more militant Left. His emphasis was on using the state as a national planning agency, an approach that appealed well beyond Labour. Dalton had the reputation of being "a brilliant man, but rash, hot-headed and impulsive, a shinning diamond of mercurial, unstable gifts with a penchant for self-damage". He was considered to be one of the most intelligent of the Labour MPs who was destined for high office should Labour win a general election, but also someone who had a self-destructive streak owing to his vanity and impulsive tendencies.

=== Foreign policy ===
Turning his attention to the looming crisis in Europe, he became the Labour Party's spokesman on foreign policy in Parliament. A crucial turning point in his views towards Germany was a meeting with a French diplomat Pierre Comert who told him on the basis of secret intelligence that Germany was rearming rapidly in violation of the terms of the Treaty of Versailles and had already established an air force (forbidden by Versailles). Comert ended his interview by telling him that strategic bombing could destroy entire cities within hours and that "the lunatics in charge [of Germany] are capable of this!" In May 1935, he wrote in his diary that Clement Attlee had given a speech in Smethwick in the West Midlands on the topic of the looming tensions between Japan and China, which he predicted could cause another world war. Dalton judged the speech a failure as he wrote: "And he talked about the Sino-Jap dispute!...Infinitely remote from the audience in both time and space". Dalton had a very Euro-centric conception of British foreign policy and tended to see Japan's imperialistic policy towards China as a far lesser concern compared to the potential threat posed by Nazi Germany.

Pacifism was a strong element in the Labour Party, until the Left moved to support arms for Republican ("Loyalist") Spain during the Spanish Civil War of 1936–1939. The Labour Party was divided between one faction opposed on principle to all war vs. another that was willing to support war against fascist aggression, and as one of the leaders of the latter faction, Dalton frequently fought against the pacifist faction. Dalton clashed in particular with Stafford Cripps, the leader of the pacifistic extreme left wing of the Labour Party. In a 1936 speech Cripps announced that he not only would oppose any war against Germany, but would actually welcome the German conquest of Britain under the grounds that German capitalists were more exploitive and vicious than British capitalists, and hence Nazi rule would bring about a socialist revolution in Britain more quickly. Dalton charged that Cripps had expressed the "judgement of a flea" in that speech, but opposed having Cripps expelled from Labour under the grounds that it would divide Labour and might led to the government calling a snap election. In September 1936, Dalton visited Paris to see the French Premier Léon Blum. He sharply criticised Blum for not offering more aid to the Spanish Republic, only to be countered by Blum who stated he was afraid of causing a civil war in France if he intervened in Spain. However Dalton was not enthusiastic for the Labour party policy of wanting to intervene, later stating:

I was far from enthusiastic for the slogan "arms for Spain" if this meant, as some of my friends eagerly did, that we were to supply arms which otherwise we should keep for ourselves, for I was much more conscious than most of my friends of the terrible insufficiency of British armaments against the German danger.

His views were different from those of Attlee, later recalling that before the Second World War he believed:

as Germany and Italy were potential enemies of Britain and Franco was their ally, it was in Britain's interest that Franco should not win the Spanish Civil War. It was on this proposition rather than any extravagant eulogy of the Spanish Government that I based most of my public references to this most tragic struggle.

Yet Dalton admitted he was wrong in this assessment of British interests, stating that "When the Germans overran France in 1940 and reached the Pyrenees, Franco was neutral, and with remarkable skill maintained his neutrality until the end of the war. Hitler respected this and never forced his way through Spain to attack Gibraltar or crossed the Straits into Morocco." and "Hitler would not have respected the neutrality of a Spanish Republican Government. If Franco had lost the Civil War, Hitler would have occupied Spain."

Aided by union votes, Dalton moved the party from semi-pacifism to a policy of armed deterrence and rejection of appeasement. He was a bitter enemy of Prime Minister Neville Chamberlain. Dalton in his speeches to the House of Commons charged that the government during the Sudetenland crisis was deliberately trying to exclude the Soviet Union from any role in the crisis despite the fact that Soviet Union had alliances with both France and Czechoslovakia. In a speech to the House of Commons, he stated: "There are some in this country who apparently think it worthwhile and a good bargain to try to push the Soviet Union out of Europe". In a letter to Robert Vansittart, Dalton wrote: "It was amazing how some people, otherwise intelligent, had a fixture about Russia and seemed almost to prefer that this country should be defeated in war without Russian aid rather than win with it".

During the Sudetenland crisis, Dalton frequently defended the Soviet stance. Dalton was a strong supporter of the League of Nations and its principles of collective security, and believed that should be the basis of an Anglo-Soviet alliance. Dalton was attached to the principle of collective security rather than alliance with the Soviet Union per se, and stated that if the Soviet Union should invade Germany, Britain should come to Germany's aid, and likewise favoured coming to aid of the Soviet Union should Germany invade. Dalton stated that what he really wanted was "a system of mutual guarantee against aggression in Europe". As the Soviet Foreign Commissar Maxim Litvinov frequently praised the League of Nations and collective security in his speeches, it was under these grounds, rather than support for communism, that Dalton advocated an Anglo-Soviet alliance. Despite his public support for an Anglo-Soviet alliance, in private Dalton admitted that the Soviet Union was "an enigma". Joseph Stalin was a very remote, mysterious figure who rarely spoke in public or saw foreigners, making it extremely difficult to determine how much Litvinov was supported by Stalin. Dalton wrote in his diary: "This is the most difficult gap in one's knowledge to get filled in...what would they do? No one in this country seemed to know". In the crisis, Dalton was in close contact with Charles Corbin, the French ambassador; Jan Masaryk, the Czechoslovak minister; and Ivan Maisky, the Soviet ambassador. The most controversial of his contacts was with Maisky who regularly leaked information about the crisis to Dalton, which he used to attack the government during question time in the House of Commons. Dalton visited the Soviet embassy in London on a frequent basis to confer with Maisky and pick up information.

Dalton defended the Soviets against the charge of acting in bad faith by only promising to go to war if France did so first, arguing that Moscow was acting in accord with the text of the 1935 Soviet-Czechoslovak alliance, that the Soviet Union was only obligated to go to war if aggression against Czechoslovakia activated the 1924 Franco-Czechoslovak alliance. Dalton believed it was possible for Britain to pressure Poland and Romania into granting the Red Army transit rights to aid Czechoslovakia, which did not have a direct border with the Soviet Union. At a meeting with Chamberlain on 17 September 1938, Dalton criticised the latter for accepting at face value the claims of the French foreign minister Georges Bonnet that the Soviet Union would do nothing if Germany invaded Czechoslovakia, and therefore it was foolish to trust the promises from the Soviet foreign commissar Maxim Litvinov who claimed otherwise. Bonnet had told Chamberlain that Litvinov had told Jean Payart, the French charge d'affairs in Moscow, that his government's talk of defending Czechoslovakia was empty bluster. Dalton recalled: "The PM said that Bonnet, in consequence of this conversation, entertained grave doubts about whether the SU meant to do anything. At that point, I said 'I must say Mr. Prime Minister that I do not believe this story. It is quite contrary to what I have heard from more than one good source on which I place reliance...This conversation, moreover, is quite inconsistent, with the clear, repeated, and recent statements by the Soviet if France moved, she would move at once'". Dalton was well aware that the Yezhovschina had wrecked the Red Army at least for the moment, but still felt that the Soviet Union was the only power capable of engaging with Germany in Eastern Europe, and was worth having as an ally against the Reich. In a speech in the House of Commons, Dalton asked Chamberlain "would it not be worth something to have the Red Army and Red Airforce on our side instead of being neutral? The Prime Minister claims for himself the title of a realist, but does not any realistic foreign policy in this country necessarily include an attempt to make sure that, if the worse should come, we should have that enormous potential on our side instead of being immobilised?...Is it not a clear calculation that if it can be shown in advance that there would be a combined force arrayed against an aggressor, which would include the Soviet Union, we should be more much likely to avoid war?" Like most other British anti-appeasers, Dalton did not want a war with the Reich, and instead believed an alliance of the Soviet Union, France, and Britain would be sufficient to cause Germany to back down from its demands on Czechoslovakia. On 30 September 1938, the crisis was ended by a conference in Munich that agreed that the Sudetenland would be ceded to Germany over the course of October 1938. During the debates on the Munich Agreement in the House of Commons, Dalton criticised the agreement as giving too much to Adolf Hitler in exchange for a written promise that he would not start a war with Britain. The British historian Louise Shaw noted that Dalton like the other anti-appeasers advocated a foreign policy that made sense in deterrence terms, but did not address the practical questions if the crisis turned to war. Dalton assumed if the crisis came to war, the Dominions would all join Britain. In fact only New Zealand had committed itself to do so while South Africa, Australia and Canada all indicated a distinct unwillingness to go to war for Czechoslovakia. Likewise, Dalton assumed if war came, Poland and Romania would give transit rights for the Red Army to defend Czechoslovakia, which was not the case.

On 15 March 1939, Germany occupied the Czech half of Czecho-Slovakia. Later that same day, Hitler during his visit to Prague proclaimed the Protectorate of Bohemia-Moravia. On 16 March 1939, Dalton played a leading role in the debates in the House of Commons about the end of Czechoslovak independence. Under the Munich Agreement, Britain had promised a "guarantee" of Czecho-Slovakia (as Czechoslovakia had been renamed in October 1938) against aggression in exchange for the Sudetenland being allowed to "go home to the Reich". Dalton in his speech to the House of Commons noted bitterly that Germany had just violated the Munich Agreement and that the British "guarantee" had proven worthless. Dalton stated that Chamberlain "should disappear from office", saying that the only decent thing left for him to do would be to resign immediately. Dalton called the newly declared state of Slovakia a sham as he stated the Slovak declaration of independence "had been paid for by German money...and organised by German agents". Dalton called the Slovak declaration of independence "a convenient legal let-ago of the guarantee" as Chamberlain insisted that the "guarantee" was not longer valid as Czecho-Slovakia had ceased to exist on 14 March even before the Germans marched in on 15 March. In response to several Conservative MPs who called Czechoslovakia an "artificial" state created by the Treaty of Versailles, Dalton called Czechoslovakia "a once free and happy model democracy in Central Europe" and noted pointedly that he had actually visited Czechoslovakia a number of times, unlike his critics who had never been there. Dalton ended his speech by warning of "a rapidly increasing danger to Britain", supported the idea put forward by the former Foreign Secretary Anthony Eden for a bloc of states to resist further aggression and urged a barrier to further aggression under the slogan "thus far, but no further".

On the evening of 30 March 1939, Dalton along with Arthur Greenwood visited 10 Downing Street where they were informed by Chamberlain that he planned to announce the British "guarantee" of Poland in a speech in the House of Commons the next day. Dalton expressed his approval of the "guarantee" of Poland, but told Chamberlain that he "would never get away with it...unless he brought in the Russians". During the Danzig crisis, Dalton supported Chamberlain's policy of creating a "peace front" to deter Germany from invading Poland, but was opposed to Chamberlain's policy of making Poland the eastern pivot of the proposed "peace front" rather than the Soviet Union. Dalton argued that Poland was too weak to play the role of the eastern pivot, and only the Soviet Union had the sufficient industrial and military capacity to engage in war with Germany. In particular, Dalton charged that Chamberlain was inept in offering the "guarantee" of Poland without any conditions as he noted that Britain had no leverage over the Polish foreign minister, Colonel Józef Beck, into granting transit rights to the Red Army in the event of a German invasion of Poland. The issue of transit rights became of a cardinal importance during the Danzig crisis as the Soviets refused to sign an alliance with Britain and France unless Poland gave transit rights first, which Colonel Beck was utterly opposed to granting. In April 1939, Dalton strongly criticised the Chamberlain government's unwillingness to seriously negotiate, noting that the British government took days and sometimes weeks to respond to Soviet offers of an alliance, which he denounced as negotiating in bad faith. As during the Sudetenland crisis, Dalton did not want a war with Germany, but instead expected the "peace front" of the Soviet Union, France, and Britain would be sufficient to deter Germany from invading Poland.

In June 1939, Dalton along with Churchill and Lloyd George were the only MPs to support the Soviet claim to offer a "guarantee" to Finland, Estonia, Latvia and Lithuania along with the Soviet concept of "indirect aggression". But Dalton was not a partisan of the Soviet line, and in July 1939 told Maisky that his government was partly to blame for the slow pace of the talks and the failure to reach a joint Anglo-Soviet "guarantee" of Romania. At another meeting with Maisky in July he supported Chamberlain's demand that the Soviet Union issue a "guarantee" of Belgium and the Netherlands to complement the "guarantee" that Chamberlain had issued in February. Dalton told Maisky that the Soviet claim his government had no interest in the Low Countries was "sheer tripe" under the grounds "there will be a war in which the SU is engaged in or not". As the talks moved at a sluggish pace, and word of the abrasive negotiating style of the new Soviet foreign commissar Vyacheslav Molotov, Dalton was forced to concede in the summer that the Soviets were in part to blame. Dalton wrote in his diary that he was faced with dilemma: "Either we press the government or not. In the first case we may encourage the Russians to be more difficult and be represented by ministers here as impeding negotiations...In other cases, we are taken to acquiescing in HMG's conduct of negotiations and make our supporters in the country impatient". Dalton approved of Chamberlain's handling of the Tientsin incident, saying in August 1939 that there was no need for a statement on the crisis in Tientsin (modern Tianjin) as "I am watching Europe day by day" as he felt that the crisis in Danzig (modern Gdańsk) to be far more important. In August 1939, Dalton along with Clement Attlee visited Paris to meet the French Socialist leaders, and expressed much dismay that the French Socialists were "either pacificist or defeatist".

Hugh Dalton was among the 2,300 names of prominent persons listed on the Nazis' Special Search List, of those who were to be arrested on the invasion of Great Britain and turned over to the Gestapo.

== Second World War ==
=== The Phoney War ===
On 1 September 1939, Germany invaded Poland, which led to expectations that Chamberlain would honour the "guarantee" he had issued on 31 March. Instead, he gave a statement that it was necessary to confer with the French premier Édouard Daladier about what to do. Dalton saw the Polish ambassador, Count Edward Raczyński, to ask if he could assist Poland by asking questions in the House of Commons about when Britain would declare war. Raczyński assured Dalton that he had every confidence that Chamberlain would honour the commitments he had made, and no such questions would be necessary. Late on 2 September 1939, Dalton went to the Foreign Office and was told by Sir William Malkin, the Foreign Office's legal adviser, on the staircase that "I have the declaration in the bag. It is settled now!" Continuing on his way, Dalton met the Foreign Secretary Lord Halifax and Sir Alexander Cadogan, the Permanent Undersecretary. Lord Halifax told Dalton that Britain would be issuing an ultimatum to Germany that would expire at 11 am 3 September, and failing its acceptance the United Kingdom would be at war. Dalton in response told Halifax "Thank God!" at the news. Halifax further stated that he expected France to issue a similar ultimatum the next day as well, saying "it will be all right tomorrow". As expected, the ultimatum calling upon the Reich to cease its war against Poland and withdraw all of its forces was rejected, and shortly after 11 am Neville Chamberlain announced on the radio that Britain was now at war. Shortly after the declaration of war, Dalton along with A. V. Alexander met with Charles Corbin, the French ambassador to the Court of St. James. Corbin was upset at rumours being spread that France intended not to honour the alliance with Poland signed in 1921. Dalton confronted Corbin by pointing to his watch and saying: "My country is at war now in fulfilment of our pledge to Poland". Corbin responded: "And my country will be at war in a few hours time". Corbin further pointed out that France had already mobilised, calling up 3 million Frenchmen to their national service and "soon she will have six million" mobilised, which was vastly more manpower being committed than what Britain had committed. Corbin also pointed that land warfare tended to be the most costly; that France had a common border with Germany and "it is upon my country that the heaviest blow will fall".

Labour issued a statement calling upon support for the war, but announced the it retained the right to criticise the government and would never join a coalition government headed by Chamberlain. At a meeting of the shadow cabinet, Dalton very firmly announced that no Labour MPs or peers were to join the Chamberlain cabinet, saying "it is not as though our leaders were supermen capable of exercising vast influence through in a tiny minority". Both Arthur Greenwood and A.V. Alexander were severely tempted to join the Chamberlain cabinet, but were dissuaded upon the threat of expulsion from the Labour Party. However, he left open the possibility that Labour might join a coalition government headed by another Conservative, which was intended to weaken Chamberlain's grip on the Conservative Party.

Dalton had long considered himself a Polonophile and was close to Count Edward Raczyński, the Polish ambassador to the Court of St. James. After war was declared, Dalton threw himself into support for Poland and in a speech on 11 September 1939 denounced the Chamberlain government for not providing any military support for Poland, saying "to sacrifice an Eastern Front altogether is a tremendous price to pay for whatever advantages are supposed to result from air inactivity in the West". The same day, Dalton went to see Sir Kingsley Wood, the Air Secretary, to demand that he be flown into Poland to assist the Polish war effort. Wood rejected that request on the grounds that "the scheme was not considered advisable". Dalton continued to lobby government ministers to open a strategic bombing offensive against Germany until 27 September 1939 when Warsaw surrendered after being besieged. At a party hosted by Count Raczyński at the Polish embassy on 18 November 1939, Dalton first met Colonel Colin Gubbins who had served with the British military mission in Poland and had escaped via Romania. Gubbins made such a positive impression on Dalton that the next year he was to insist that Gubbins served as the military head of the Special Operations Executive. The war took on a personal note for Dalton on 23 December 1939 when he learned that one of his prewar friends, the Polish Socialist Mieczysław Niedziałkowski, had been arrested by the Gestapo.

During the Phoney War, Dalton cultivated contacts with anti-Chamberlain Conservative MPs such as Leo Amery, Robert Boothby, and Anthony Eden, suggesting that they vote with Labour against the government should an opportune moment present itself. In a book published in March 1940 entitled Hitler's War: Before and After, Dalton argued that forced population exchanges were the solution to the problems of Eastern Europe as he argued that both the Sudetenland crisis and the Danzig crisis had proved that the existence of German minorities in Eastern Europe was being used as a pretext for German aggression. Dalton argued that to prevent a repeat of the German complaints about the Polish Corridor that East Prussia should be annexed to Poland after the war. He approved of the point in the "final offer" that the German Foreign Minister Joachim von Ribbentrop presented to the British ambassador Nevile Henderson late on the night of 30 August 1939 for a forced population exchange between Germany and Poland, and stated that after an Allied victory an "organised movement of population" be carried out under the auspices of "an impartial arbiter". He also called for expelling the entire German community of the Sudetenland as the "indisputable condition of future tranquility".

Chamberlain's position became untenable after many Conservative MPs refused to support him in the Norway Debate in April 1940, and Dalton and other senior Labour leaders made clear they would join any coalition government except one headed by Chamberlain. Just before the Norway Debate about allegations that the government had mismanaged the expedition to Norway, Dalton told the anti-Chamberlain Conservative MP Harold Macmillan that the Labour would treat the Norway debate as a confidence vote, and urged Macmillan to have his allies vote against the government. After Chamberlain resigned early in May, and Lord Halifax had declined the position, Winston Churchill became prime minister. Attlee declared his support for Churchill and announced that Labour would be joining his government. At the time, there was a Labour Party conference in Bournemouth in session, and many delegates were displeased with the prospect of Labour serving in a Churchill government as Churchill was well known for his anti-union and anti-socialist views. In a speech on the evening of 10 May, Dalton blasted the anti-Churchill delegates as "a lot of freaks talking pathetic rubbish".

=== Minister of Economic Warfare ===
During Churchill's coalition government (1940–45) Dalton was Minister of Economic Warfare from 1940 to 1942. On 14 May 1940, Churchill phoned Dalton who was attending the conference in Bournemouth to tell him: "Your friends tell me that you made a considerable study of economic warfare. Will you take that ministry?" Dalton answered: "I should be very glad to do so. I am proud to serve under you". He established the Special Operations Executive, and was later a member of the executive committee of the Political Warfare Executive. Dalton's friend Niedzialkowski was shot without a trial as an "enemy of the Reich" on 21 June 1940 in the Palmiru Wood, an action which greatly angered Dalton when he learned of it. The British historian Matthew Frank called Dalton "a particularly duplicitous, cunning and vain politician with an overbearing and forceful personality" who exercised more influence on government policy than what his titles would suggest. Dalton was widely respected, but also disliked in the cabinet. His fellow Labour MP Emmanuel Shinwell called him "the most wicked man in politics I've known". The Conservative MP Brendan Bracken said Dalton was "the biggest bloodiest shit I've met!" Dalton greatly admired Churchill who by contrast could not stand him, once joking "Dr. Dalton as he calls himself, though I have yet to hear of a patient he has cured". Churchill once remarked "Keep that man away from me. I can't stand his booming voice and shifty eyes". The British historian Terry Charman wrote Dalton was greatly respected for his intelligence and dynamism, but that he had "a very abrasive and bullying personality" that alienated many. A typical comment from Dalton was his statement to Churchill in late May 1940 that the sessions of the House of Commons were a waste of time, leading him to ask "why don't you shut up this bloody monkey house or at any rate open it one day a week?" Dalton frequently mocked Shinwell as "Shinbad the Tailor" as Shinwell played more the role of an opposition politician during question periods in the House of Commons, asking difficult questions for the ministers.

As Minister of Economic Warfare, Dalton argued that guerrilla warfare was the natural ally of Britain's strategic bombing offensive, sabotaging German war industries that lay beyond the range of bombers. At a meeting on 1 July 1940, Dalton put forward to the Foreign Secretary Lord Halifax and the service ministers his case for the Ministry of Economic Warfare having its own armed wing. Dalton argued: "What we have in mind is not a military job at all. It concerns trade unionists, socialists, etc-the making of revolution and chaos-no more suitable for soldiers than fouling at football". Both Stewart Menzies, the chief of MI6, and Frederick Beaumont-Nesbitt, the Director of Military Intelligence, were opposed to Dalton's plan, but Clement Attlee was persuaded that Dalton's plan had much merit, and set about lobbying Churchill to support it. It was around this time that Dalton came to be known as "Dr. Dynamo", the nickname given to him by Gladwyn Jebb that was a reference to his DSc in economics and to his relentless dynamism as he pressed his case. Attlee insisted to Churchill that only someone on the left was capable of leading an organisation dedicated to subversion and sabotage, and that "Dr. Dynamo" was the best man available. Beyond the immediate concerns, the Labour leaders had a deep distrust of MI6. The 1924 election had been decided by the so-called Zinoviev letter, a forged letter supposedly written by Grigory Zinoviev of the Comintern instructing British Communists to infiltrate the Labour Party and the British military that was published in the Daily Mail on the eve of the election. The Zinoviev letter had been leaked to the Daily Mail by someone in MI6, and as a result Attlee and the other Labour leaders simply did not trust MI6, and wanted an intelligence organisation headed by one of their own. At a meeting on 22 July 1940, Churchill gave his approval for the Special Operations Executive (SOE), telling Dalton "And now set Europe ablaze!" Dalton appointed Jebb as his "chief executive officer", which proved to be a fortuitous appointment as Jebb was a close friend of Sir Alexander Cadogan, the Permanent Under-Secretary at the Foreign Office who proved to an invaluable ally for SOE at Whitehall. Unlike Halifax and his successor as Foreign Secretary Anthony Eden, who saw SOE as a rather distasteful organisation which they wanted the Foreign Office to keep at arm's length, Cadogan was always a strong supporter of SOE. Halifax was opposed to Dalton's plans to have SOE agents attached to the British legation in Bucharest in order to blow up the Romanian oil fields that supplied the Reich with much of its oil. In a letter to Halifax, Dalton stated: "We have got to organise movements in enemy-occupied territory comparable to the Sein Fein movement in Ireland, to the Chinese guerrillas now operating against Japan, to the Spanish irregulars who played such a notable role in Wellington's campaign...the "democratic international" must use many different methods including industrial and military sabotage, labour agitation and strikes, continuous propaganda, terrorist acts against traitors and German leaders, boycotts and riots". The American historian Douglas Porch described Dalton as a "true radical" who thought that most British Army officers were too conservative to embrace guerrilla warfare, and encouraged the recruitment of unconventional people. The headquarters of SOE were on Baker Street, hence the nickname for SOE as the "Baker Street Irregulars" after the gang of street urchins who assisted Sherlock Holmes in the stories by Arthur Conan Doyle.

SOE is most famous for its operations in France, but in 1940 Dalton was highly dismissive of any possibility of resistance in France, writing "the French are too much attached to their mistresses and their soup and their little properties. We see right before our eyes nothing less than the liquification of France". Dalton disliked General Charles de Gaulle whom he hoped would be replaced by someone else as the leader of the Free French, writing in his diary: "Still no Frenchmen blowing any trumpets anywhere except de G in London and his trumpet blasts are becoming a bit monotonous". He saw de Gaulle as a power-hungry adventurer of questionable democratic convictions, and had no faith in him as an ally. Dalton's view of French Army officers in general was precisely the same as those of the French Socialists, namely as a gang of reactionary Catholics hostile to the heritage of the French Revolution. SOE had given the responsibility for covert propaganda while the Ministry of Information under Alfred Duff Cooper was in charge of overt propaganda. By November 1940, Dalton and Duff Cooper were feuding over control of propaganda, leading to Churchill to appoint Lord Beaverbrook to serve as a meditator.

Dalton had a special interest in Poland as it was the only country in 1940 where guerrilla warfare was actually being waged, primarily by Polish Army soldiers who had retreated to the forests in 1939. Besides Gubbins, Dalton's main liaison was Stanisław Kot, the Minister of the Interior in the Polish government-in-exile. On 18 June 1940, General Władysław Sikorski ordered the Union of Armed Struggle resistance group to cease their guerrilla attacks as "pointless" as too many Poles were being executed by the Germans in retaliation and to limit their activities for the time being to intelligence-gathering. Despite Sikorski's orders, Dalton still saw the Polish resistance as SOE's "principal asset" in 1940 and was very keen to have the guerrilla war in Poland renewed. Dalton had pressed since the summer of 1940 for the Royal Air Force to make aircraft available to parachute in SOE agents to make contact with the Polish resistance, a request that was finally approved by the Air Ministry in late 1940. In the fall of 1940, Dalton met with Kot a number of times to plan SOE's operations in Poland. Dalton had insisted upon making Gubbins the military head of SOE and he reported to duty on 18 November 1940. Jebb described Gubbins as "the real motive force in the machine". Gubbins later stated that Dalton was a difficult minister to serve, but that he was completely dedicated to making SOE a success and was relentless in defending SOE from its many critics in Whitehall. Unlike other "Establishment" figures, Gubbins did not see Dalton as a "class traitor" for being a socialist, and moreover shared Dalton's admiration for the Poles. Gubbins said of Dalton that "He drove himself and his leading figures in SOE equally hard".

Dalton spent Christmas 1940 in Scotland as the guest of General Sikorski where he reviewed the Polish divisions that been had stationed there. Dalton described Polish soldiers he reviewed as "fine soldiers and attractive human beings". Besides making speeches, Dalton's visit to Scotland was to make contact with the Sixth Bureau (Polish military intelligence) in order to find volunteers for the SOE. Dalton was able to use the role of the Polish Air Force squadron to finally have Churchill overrule the Air Ministry's opposition to the long and dangerous flight to Poland, and make an aircraft available for SOE's Polish operations. The containers that were to be parachuted into Poland along with the agents carrying arms, false papers and the other paraphernalia of a secret agent were to become standard issue for SOE agents throughout Europe. Just before the flight was launched, Józef Retinger held a party whose guests of honour were Dalton and Sikorski to celebrate the mission. The first flight taking three Polish SOE agents, namely Stanisław Krzymowski, Józef Zabielski and Czesław Raczkowski, to Poland took place on 15 February 1941. The round flight of 1,500 miles was to Poland in a Whitley bomber nearly exhausted the fuel reserves of the plane and the three Polish agents were parachuted by mistake into the Warthegau ruled by the violently anti-Polish Gauleiter Arthur Greiser. The Germans found out about the parachute landings as they captured the containers and posted wanted posters all over Poland labelling the three SOE agents as "exceptionally dangerous bandits" for whose capture a generous reward of Reichsmarks were offered. The Polish operation marked the first time that SOE had attracted attention in Europe. Dalton was overjoyed when the news reached him that despite all the wanted posters the three Polish agents had reached Warsaw and made contact with the Resistance, which he saw as the beginning of a great revolt in Poland. Dalton did not seem to understand that Poland was at the extreme range of British aircraft and that his plans to fly in a massive number of weapons and agents, as the prelude for sending in an entire airborne division with the aim of launching a revolt, were unrealistic. An attempt to send SOE agents into the Protectorate of Bohemia-Moravia was less successful. Dalton and Gubbins met with Edvard Beneš, the president of the Czechoslovak government-in-exile, and his intelligence chief František Moravec, and secured the promise that a dozen Czech servicemen would volunteer for SOE. Just before the flight to send the Czech SOE agents into the Protectorate was set to take off, the mission was "gazumped" by MI6 who claimed the agent who was to serve as the radio operator for themselves, thereby causing the mission to be aborted.

Churchill accepted Dalton, whom he disliked, as a minister because Attlee had insisted that he have a portfolio. Over the course of the winter of 1940–1941, Dalton made countless complaints that Churchill was not seeing him. Churchill's intelligence adviser, Desmond Morton, came from MI6 and like other MI6 officers he was hostile towards the upstart SOE. On 17 February 1941, Frank Nelson of SOE recorded a phone call from Morton whose general gist was that "the Prime Minister hated Dalton, hated Jebb, hated me, hated the entire organisation". It was not until March 1941 that Dalton was finally invited to spend the weekend with Churchill at the Chequers estate. On 27 March 1941, a bloodless coup d'état overthrew the Regent of Yugoslavia, Prince Paul, and proclaimed the boy king King Peter II to be of his majority. The two principal leaders of the coup in Belgrade were General Borivoje Mirković and General Dušan Simović, but in London Dalton claimed the credit, arguing that the SOE had organised the coup, a claim whose veracity was unclear. The claim that the SOE had launched coup in Belgrade did much to improve Dalton's standing with Churchill. The sequel to the coup was the German Invasion of Yugoslavia launched on 6 April 1941. Simović who was now serving as prime minister unwisely chose not to mobilise the Yugoslav military, vainly hoping not to provoke Hitler, and equally unwisely spread the Yugoslav forces too thin trying to defend all of Yugoslavia. Within twelve days, Yugoslavia was conquered and the Yugoslav government fled to London to join the other governments-in-exile already located there. Dalton later claimed that the coup in Belgrade was a crucial turning point in the war as he maintained the invasion of Yugoslavia in April delayed the launch of Operation Barbarossa from May to June. Dalton wrote "the effect of the coup, disappointing in military terms in Yugoslavia itself, delayed the German attack by a precious fortnight."

In May 1941, Dalton came into a dispute with Archibald Wavell, the GOCinC of Middle East Command, over the control of the SOE's station in Cairo, which was responsible for SOE operations in the Middle East and the Balkans. On 10 May 1941, Eric Dorman-Smith, writing on behalf of Wavell, ordered that SOE Cairo was subject to the "order and instruction" of Middle East Command. Dalton wrote to Wavell protesting against placing a SOE station "under the direct orders of your staff", saying that as Minister of Economic Warfare, all SOE stations were under his control. By the summer of 1941, food requisitions by the occupying powers had caused a famine in Greece. As Minister of Economic Warfare, Dalton was in charge of enforcing the blockade against Greece, which the Germans blamed for the famine. Throughout the entire famine in Greece, the German position was that the Reich would do nothing to help the starving Greeks, and if the British wanted to help the Greeks, they should lift the blockade against Greece. In June 1941, Eden suggested lifting the blockade, saying that much of the Greek population was going to starve to death, which was opposed by Dalton who argued this would render the blockade of Europe ineffective. On 3 July 1941, Dalton reversed himself and told Eden that he was prepared to ignore food shipments to Greece via Turkey, saying he wanted "a tacit understanding with the Greeks that we wink at shipments of food and not attack ships engaged in this traffic".

In August 1941, reports reached London that some of the Serb units in the Royal Yugoslav Army had fled into the mountains in April and were waging a guerrilla war. The guerrillas called themselves the Chetniks after the guerrilla fighters of the 19th century and were led by Draža Mihailović. On 28 August 1941, Simović met with Churchill to tell him of the existence of the Chetniks and on the same day Churchill ordered Dalton to offer whatever support SOE could to the Chetniks. On 29 August 1941, Dalton declared that his policy towards the Chetniks was to have SOE offer maximum support in form of arms and ammunition, and that "the guerrilla and sabotage bands now active in Yugoslavia should show sufficient resistance to cause constant embarrassment to the occupying forces". However, Dalton vetoed having the Chetniks "attempt any large-scale uprisings or ambitious military operations which only result at present in severe repression". Dalton told Churchill he was in the process of dispatching a SOE mission to the Chetniks that would consist of two Yugoslav officers, Zahariji Osojiċ and Mirko Lalatović, and a British officer, Bill Hudson. At this stage in the war, SOE worked exclusively with the Chetniks as no-one in the British government were aware in the summer of 1941 of the existence of rival Communist Partisan resistance movement led by Josip Broz Tito. The SOE mission was landed via submarine on the coast of Montenegro close to Petrovac. It was not until September that the SOE discovered that there were two resistance movements in Yugoslavia: the left-wing Partisans and the right-wing Chetniks.

On 8 October 1941, de Gaulle wrote to Dalton requesting permission to have the Gaullist resistance groups undertake "political" work instead of the purely military work that they had been performing to date. Dalton vetoed this request under the grounds that the purpose of SOE was to encourage resistance in France, not take sides in French politics by backing the Gaullists, against the other non-Gaullist groups. De Gaulle's response was to simply ignore Dalton's veto and to send out Jean Moulin in January 1942 with orders to persuade all of the non-Gaullist resistance groups to accept his claim to be the leader of Free France. By November 1941, a major dilemma for SOE had emerged when it was learned that a war-within-the-war had broken out as the Partisans and Chetniks were fighting each other. This was especially problematic for Dalton who had presented Yugoslavia as a success story for SOE as he argued that the bands of guerillas up in the mountains of Bosnia, Serbia and Montenegro had tied down a number of German divisions that otherwise be used in North Africa or against the Soviet Union. In a letter to Churchill on 11 December 1941, Dalton claimed that SOE had brokered a truce between Mihailović and Tito, the morale of the guerrillas and the combined force of the Chetniks and the Partisans were "immobilising no less than 7 German and 12 Italian divisions". Dalton wrote it was "absolute essential to keep the revolt going if we possibly can and to regard it as an extension of the Libyan front".

=== President of the Board of Trade ===
Dalton became President of the Board of Trade in 1942; the future Labour leader Hugh Gaitskell, drafted into the civil service during the war, was his Principal Private Secretary. In this position he tackled the price rings. On 21 February 1942, Churchill phoned Dalton to offer to promote him to President of the Board of Trade. He wrote in his diary that day: "Handing over SOE twangs my heart strings, and I shall feel very desolate and unfriended if I lose the daily presence of whose who have been for 21 months my trusted inner circle". Even after leaving SOE, Dalton remained in close contact with the Polish government-in-exile, especially with Józef Retinger. In March 1942, Dalton introduced a bill in the House of Commons for coal rationing, which led to strong opposition from the Conservative MPs who saw his bill as the first step towards the nationalisation of the coal industry. At least 50 Tory MPs threatened to resign from the party and go over to the opposition side if Dalton's bill was passed, which would have eroded the government's majority. In the cabinet, Dalton's bill was supported by Ernest Bevin and Stafford Cripps, but opposed by Churchill, which led Dalton to drop the bill in May 1942. Instead, Dalton in a white paper released in early June 1942 proposed "dual control" of the coal mining industry with the British state taking control of the mines while the mining companies would retain control over the financial aspects of the mines, a compromise that was badly received in the Labour party. The controversy reflected a more broader test of strength over social policy with one Conservative MP telling Dalton that "they acted as they did because they felt the Labour Party in the Government was getting too of its own way".

Dalton was very close to Edvard Beneš and supported his plans to expel the entire Sudeten German community after the war, saying that the Sudetenland crisis of 1938 had proven that Sudeten Germans were not loyal to Czechoslovakia. In May 1942, Dalton told General Władysław Sikorski that he supported Poland after the war annexing the "whole East Prussian coast and Danzig" and that the Poles should "drive out" all of the Germans living there. Dalton often argued that forced population transfer between Greece and Turkey in 1922–1923 should be the model for solving the problems of minorities in Eastern Europe as he argued for populations transfers as the best way of preventing future wars. During the Quit India Movement protests in August 1942, Dalton blamed "Indian capitalists" for the protests, charging that Mahatma Gandhi and the Congress Party in general were puppets of pro-Axis Indian businessmen. Dalton wanted the Raj to bankroll the Radical Democratic Party led by M. N. Roy to create a counterbalance to the Congress Party and the Muslim League. In August 1942, Dalton endorsed a paper from one of his civil servants, James Meade, calling for an "International Commercial Union", which served as the prototype for what eventually became GATT. In November 1942, Dalton circulated Meade's paper to the rest of the cabinet, having "taken account, but not too much account of all the frightened and too prudent shrieks of my officials". In December 1942, Dalton formed a committee under a civil servant, Arnold Overton, that called for "a large scale clearance of pre-war impediments to trade between nations" by cutting tariffs by 25% for all members of the "Commercial Union" along with a ban on new tariffs. Dalton's proposal for an end to the protectionism that characterised the 1930s drew strong opposition within the cabinet from Leo Amery, the India Secretary and a long-standing advocate of Imperial Preference. Churchill tended to support the call for free trade, but was unwilling to go too far least he trigger a revolt by Amery along with a number of Conservative backbenches. However, at a cabinet meeting, Churchill endorsed Dalton's proposal by saying he was for "the freest possible exchange of goods and services", though he did not say if that meant the abolition of the Imperial preference tariffs and he called for Britain to have the right to impose new tariffs to maintain the balance-of-payments. The cabinet voted to accept Dalton's proposal for a multilateral trade agreement as the basis of the post-war world by a vote of 15 to 2. Before embarking on negotiations, it was necessary to secure the agreement of the Dominions. Of all the Dominions, Canada was by far the most enthusiastic as the United States was Canada's largest trading partner and the United Kingdom the second-largest, and from the Canadian perspective ending the Anglo-American trade war that had started with the Smoot–Hawley Tariff Act was imperative. By contrast, New Zealand, Australia and South Africa all expressed reservations about the end of Imperial Preference as all three had large agricultural sectors that benefited from access to the British market. The need for a common position between Britain and the Dominions delayed the talks with the Americans on reducing tariffs after the war, much to Dalton's vexation.

In a speech in March 1943, Churchill stated that after the war he wanted to lead "a national government comprising the best men in all the parties", an ambiguous statement that suggested that he either wanted to continue the coalition after the war or found a centrist party or was a warning to Labour that the party might split as had in 1931 if it tried to break up the coalition after the war. In response, Attlee issued a statement saying in effect that Labour would decide what course to pursue when the war was won. Within the Labour Party and in the newspapers, it was widely rumoured that Dalton along with Herbert Morrison were angling to have the coalition government continued after the war, and were pressing for Attlee to make a statement committing the party to that course. The rumours were true. Both Dalton and Morrison were both convinced that the "Churchill factor", namely Churchill's popularity, would ensure that the Conservatives would win the next general election, and that continuing the coalition would ensure that there would be Labour ministers in the cabinet and that the government would pass at least some social reforms.

In May 1943, Dalton told Philip Noel-Baker that "we should not try to make frontiers fit the perverse distribution of racial populations, assumed to be immobile. The repatriation of the Greek minority from Turkey and the more recent, and incredibly more brutal movements ordered by Hitler show what can be done". Starting on 23 June 1943, Dalton as chairman of Labour's international sub-committee was charged with drawing up a Labour government's post-war foreign policy in order to rebut the charge that Labour only spoke in abstract terms about foreign policy. Dalton's principal concern in his paper was Germany, which he wanted to totally disarmed forever and possibly broken up into several new states. Because German aggression in Eastern Europe had been justified om the grounds that Germann was protecting the volksdeutsche (ethnic German) minorities, Dalton advocated expelling all of the volksdeutsche into Germany. Dalton wrote that the Treaty of Versailles was flawed because it left all of their peoples of Eastern Europe in their places and imposed a series of minority treaties on the states of Eastern Europe designed to protect the rights of minorities, which had provided an excuse for German aggression. Dalton wrote: "This time, the frontiers have been drawn, having regard to geographical and economic convenience, all national minorities should be encouraged to join the national states to which they belong. In particular, all Germans left outside the post-war frontiers of Germany should be encouraged to "go home to the Reich". It will indeed be in their interests to do so, and in good time, because their victims will be on their tracks. Such movements of population will be a small affair compared with the gigantic "general post" which Hitler has set going all over Europe, and the vast post-war problem of the repatriation of prisoners and exiles. The transfer of the population between Turkey and Greece was an outstanding success. This is a precedent to be followed. It settled the question once and for all with no hang-over". In September 1943, Dalton wrote to Attlee about what course to pursue after the war, saying: "It would be total lunacy to fight an election, if could be avoided, against the present Prime Minister with the laurels of victory upon his brows...therefore, my simple plan is, though it might be impossible to execute it, to continue the all-party government and screw as much good policy as we could out of our colleagues while it lasted until such time as we could fight a general election and win it with a Labour majority".

In his first draft of his foreign policy paper presented on 12 November 1943, Dalton stated that he favoured continuing the "Big Three" alliance of the Soviet Union, the United States and the United Kingdom to become "the solid nucleus of a world organization" working together to uphold peace after the war. He also called for Allied occupations of both Japan and Germany; for both Japan and Germany to be completely disarmed forever; and for Anglo-American-Soviet control of the German economic and financial system. Much of his paper was given over to German "responsibility" for the war and war crimes. Dalton argued that millions of Germans were involved in Nazi war crimes in one way or another as he stated the German working class which was "doing their utmost" to sustain the German war effort by building weapons for the Wehrmacht were just as guilty of war crimes as members of the National Socialist German Workers' Party and the Wehrmacht. Dalton wrote that there were "good Germans", but "they are singularly ineffective in restraining the bad Germans." In a repudiation of the protectionism that characterised the world economy in the Great Depression, Dalton called for a comprehensive effort to lower tariffs on both goods and services for the entire world as he argued Britain would benefit from more free trade and less protectionism.

The principal objection to Dalton's foreign policy paper came from the Labour MP Philip Noel-Baker who disliked the idea of the leaders of the "Big Three" alliance deciding the fate of the world and wanted some sort of international organisation to be in charge of the post-war world. In the final draft submitted on 7 March 1944, Dalton called for the permanent disarmament of Germany, a lengthy occupation of Germany, the reduction of any industry that could be used for military purposes and international control of the German economy, punishment for all war criminals, for Germany to pay reparations to the Allied powers and the expulsion of the volksdeutsche minorities from Eastern Europe with the only exceptions being for those willing to be "loyal subjects". The sections dealing with Germany drew objections from Noel-Baker, Harold Laski and Jim Griffiths who complained about the call for reparations and Dalton's use of the word "German" in place of "Nazi", which seemed to imply a sort of German collective guilt. Noel-Baker in particular objected to Dalton's sentence about "the calculated German plan to kill all Jews in Europe", saying he wanted the statement to instead say "the calculated Nazi plan to kill all the Jews in Europe". Dalton also declared his support for Zionism as his paper called for a post-war Labour government to work to establish a Jewish state in the Palestine Mandate after the war. On Palestine, Dalton wrote that Jews should be encouraged to "enter this tiny land in such numbers as to become a majority. There was a strong case for this before the War. There is an irresistible case now, after the unspeakable atrocities of the cold and calculated German Nazi plan to kill all the Jews in Europe. Here too, in Palestine surely is a case on human grounds, to promote a stable settlement, for the transfer of population. Let the Arabs be encouraged to move out as the Jews move in". Dalton argued that Palestine was less than half the size of Wales; that the Arab world was large; and the Palestinians should be financially compensated for agreeing to leave Palestine. Finally, he called for extending the size of the projected Jewish state and called for talks with Egypt, Syria and Transjordan (modern Jordan) about transferring more territory. Dalton's paper drew opposition from Aneurin Bevan who charged that his paper was too harsh towards Germany and would drive the Germans towards supporting the Nazi regime, which was clearly losing the war by this point.

Dalton's paper was important as preparation for a general election. By 1944, Dalton was complaining that there was too much difference of opinion between Labour, Liberal and Conservative ministers on matters of social and economic policies, and that the wartime spirit of unity would not last after the war. Dalton still hoped to keep the coalition government going after the war, but he felt that hope was becoming increasingly unrealistic. The most important bill Dalton passed in the Churchill government was the Distribution of Industry Act, which he introduced in 1944, which called for the government to encourage industries to relocate to the economically depressed areas of the North of England, Scotland, Wales and Northern Ireland. The way that Churchill strongly hinted to Dalton that he intended to repeal the Distribution of Industry Act after the war was for him another example of the impossibility of continuing the coalition. In February 1944, Dalton complained about the slow pace of reaching a common position with the Dominions on trade, declaring "it is incredible how these rambling discussions succeed one another with no new arguments and no one ever changing sides and never any firm decisions". The Labour Australian prime minister John Curtin was committed to a Keynesian policy of seeking full employment after the war as he vowed that Australia would never be ravaged by a depression again. Besides his full employment policies, Curtin wanted to sponsor the industrialisation of Australia, which was still in its early stages as Australia was a more rural nation in the 1940s than today. For all these reasons, Curtin was especially hostile towards ending the Imperial Preference system as he believed that ending tariffs on American goods would be the end of Australia's industrialisation along with any prospect of full employment. Dalton believed that lower tariffs would mean lower prices for goods, especially food, for the British people and that the expanded trade with the United States caused by lowering tariffs would be crucial for Britain's postwar economic recovery. At a cabinet meeting in February 1944, Dalton was the subject of much abuse by Lord Beaverbrook, a long-standing advocate of Imperial Preference. When Beaverbrook claimed that the government of his native Canada wanted to keep the Imperial Preference system, Dalton flatly told him that he was wrong and the Canadian Prime Minister William Lyon Mackenzie King wanted a multilateral economic order with lower tariffs amongst the nations of the West. An angry Beaverbrook replied that when the Canadian people learned what Mackenzie King wanted, there would be a "revolution" in Canada. At a Commonwealth economic conference in London in February–March 1944, the Canadian delegation wanted a 50% reduction in tariffs after war the while the British delegation wanted a 25% reduction and South African, New Zealand and especially Australian delegations wanted to continue the Imperial Preference tariffs after the war. On 14 April 1944, Dalton along with Richard Law presented a proposal for a "Commercial Union" with the United States that was intended to gradually phrase out all Anglo-American tariffs that led to such opposition from Amery that the proposal was dropped. Dalton's paper was accepted as the basis for a Labour government's post-war foreign policy at a conference in London between 11 and 15 December 1944. Despite the pro-Zionist stance of his paper, Dalton's statements about "population transfers" as the solution to problems of Palestine created opposition from the Jewish Agency (the semi-official agency in charge of the Jewish population of Palestine), which feared that would rule out any possibility of a compromise with the Palestinian Arabs.

In 1945, Dalton announced that Labour would only win a general election "with the votes of the football crowd", arguing that Labour needed to take a populist stance that would appeal to working-class men who were not necessarily socialists but were only loyal to their local football clubs. When Germany surrendered on 8 May 1945, it was not clear if Labour would press for a general election by leaving the coalition government or continue the coalition until the war with Japan was won. Dalton favoured continuing the coalition government headed by Churchill into peacetime, but at a Labour Party conference in Blackpool on 19 May 1945 the delegates led by Herbert Morrison voted overwhelmingly to leave the coalition and thus force a general election.

== Chancellor of the Exchequer ==
=== Appointment ===
After the unexpected Labour victory in the 1945 general election Dalton wished to become Foreign Secretary, but the job was instead given to Ernest Bevin. Dalton, with his skills in economics, became Chancellor of the Exchequer. Alongside Bevin, Clement Attlee, Herbert Morrison and Stafford Cripps, Dalton was one of the "Big Five" of the Labour government.

In his biography of Attlee and Churchill, Leo McKinstry wrote: "Attlee had initially decided that two of the other most vital jobs, the Treasury and the Foreign Office, should be filled by Bevin and Dalton respectively. But the King had baulked at the idea of Dalton as Foreign Secretary, seeing him as untrustworthy and partisan. Similarly, the Foreign Office exerted pressure against Dalton, the outgoing Foreign Secretary Anthony Eden declaring that ‘it should be Bevin’." In 1944, Dalton, a Zionist, called for the establishment of a Jewish state in Palestine. He argued for population transfer, stating: "Let the Arabs be encouraged to move out, as the Jews move in." He went even further and discussed the possibility of "extending the present Palestinian boundaries, by agreement with Egypt, Syria, or Trans-Jordan". In private, Dalton often referred to people of colour as "diseased nigger communities" or "wogs". Between 1945 and 1948, the three principal Zionist groups in Palestine, the Haganah on the left and the Irgun and Lehi (which the British called the "Stern Gang") on the right waged a guerrilla struggle against the British. Dalton for all his support for Zionism was described as being "appalled" by the attacks on British soldiers and policemen, especially by the ruthless tactics of the Irgun and Stern Gang.

=== Economic policy ===
The Treasury faced urgent problems. Half of the wartime economy had been devoted to mobilizing soldiers, warplanes, bombs and munitions; an urgent transition to a peacetime budget was necessary, while minimizing inflation. Financial aid through Lend Lease from the United States was abruptly and unexpectedly terminated in September 1945, and new loans and cash grants from the United States and Canada were essential to keep living conditions tolerable. In the long run, Labour was committed to nationalization of industry and national planning of the economy, to more taxation of the rich and less of the poor, and to expanding the welfare state and creating free medical services for everyone.

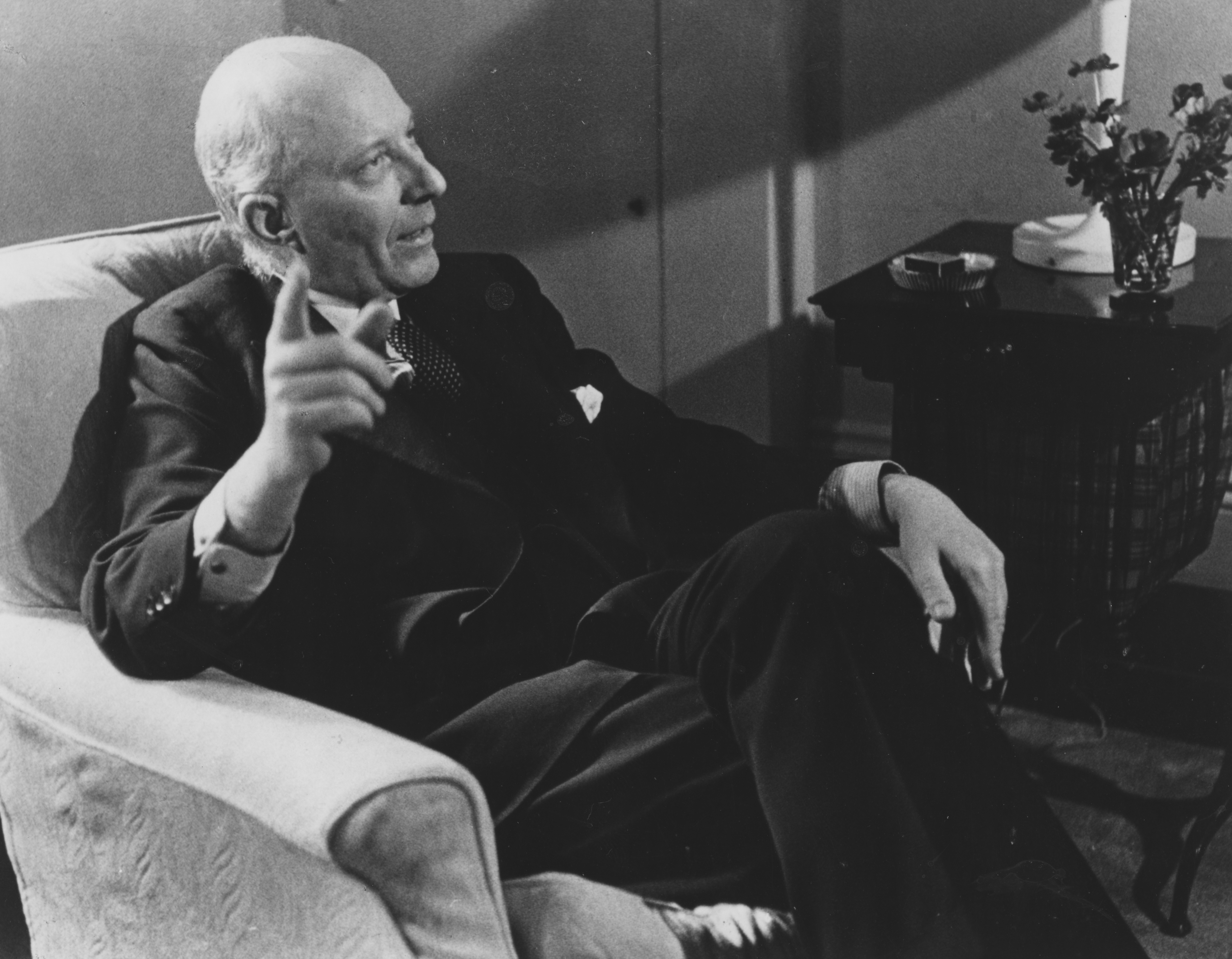
Dalton in 1962

During the war, most overseas investments had been sold to fund the cost of its prosecution (the state thus losing the income from them), and Britain suffered severe balance of payments problems. The $3.75 billion 50-year American loan negotiated by John Maynard Keynes in 1946 (and the $1.25 billion loan from Canada) was soon exhausted. By 1947, rationing had to be tightened and the convertibility of the pound suspended. In the atmosphere of crisis, Morrison and Cripps intrigued to replace Attlee with Bevin as prime minister; Bevin refused to play along, and Attlee bought off Cripps by giving him Morrison's responsibilities for economic planning. Ironically, of the "Big Five" it was Dalton who ultimately fell victim to the events of that year.

Cheaper money—that is, low interest rates—was an important goal for Dalton during his Chancellorship. He wanted to avoid the high interest rates and unemployment experienced after the First World War, and to keep down the cost of nationalization. He gained support for this cheaper money policy from Keynes, as well as from officials of the Bank of England and the Treasury. Dalton supported independence for India, saying in a 1946 speech: "If you are in a place where you are not wanted, and where you have not got the force, or perhaps the will, to quash those who don't want you, the only thing to do is come out". Dalton complained that subsiding the Greek government, which was losing a civil war against Communist guerrillas, was costing the British treasury too much and advised ending the subsidies. By contrast, Bevin who was serving as Foreign Secretary, pressed for continuing aid to Greece. Bevin argued if the Communists won the Greek Civil War, the new government in Athens would grant air and naval bases to the Soviet Union, which in turn would allow the Soviets to dominate the eastern Mediterranean Sea, which in effect would be the same as severing the Suez canal. In early 1947, there was a vigorous debate between Dalton and Bevin about subsiding the Greek government, which was won by Dalton who argued that HMG could not longer afford the subsidies. In this way, Dalton played an important role in triggering what came to be known as the Truman Doctrine as the United States was informed that Britain would cease subsiding Greece as of 1 April 1947, and if the Americans wanted to stop the Greek Communists from winning the civil war, they would have to take action.

=== Budget ===
Budgetary policy under Dalton was strongly progressive, as characterised by policies such as increased food subsidies, heavily subsidised rents to council house tenants, the lifting of restrictions on housebuilding, the financing of national assistance and family allowances, and extensive assistance to rural communities and Development Areas. Dalton was also responsible for funding the introduction of Britain's universal family allowances scheme, doing so "with a song in my heart", as he later put it.

In one of his budgets, Dalton significantly increased spending on education (which included £4 million for the universities and the provision of free school milk), £38 million for the start (from August 1946) of family allowances, and an additional £10 million for Development Areas. In addition, the National Land Fund was established. Harold Macmillan, who inherited Dalton's housing responsibilities when the Conservatives returned to power in 1951, later acknowledged his debt to Dalton's championing of New Towns, and was grateful for the legacy of Dalton's Town Development Bill, which encouraged urban overfill schemes and the movement of industry out of cities.

Food subsidies were maintained at high wartime levels in order to restrain living costs, while taxation structures were altered to benefit low-wage earners, with some 2.5 million workers taken out of the tax system altogether in Dalton's first two budgets. There were also increases in surtax and death duties, which were opposed by the Opposition. According to one historian, Dalton's policies as Chancellor reflected "an unprecedented emphasis by central government on the redistribution of income".

==== Budget-leaking and resignation ====
Walking into the House of Commons to give the autumn 1947 budget speech, Dalton made an off-the-cuff remark to a journalist, telling him of some of the tax changes in the budget. The news was printed in the early edition of the evening papers before he had completed his speech, and whilst the stock market was still open. This was a scandal, and led to his resignation for leaking a budget secret. He was succeeded by Stafford Cripps. Though initially implicated in the allegations that led to the Lynskey tribunal in 1948, he was ultimately exonerated officially, but his reputation suffered another blow.

=== Return to cabinet ===
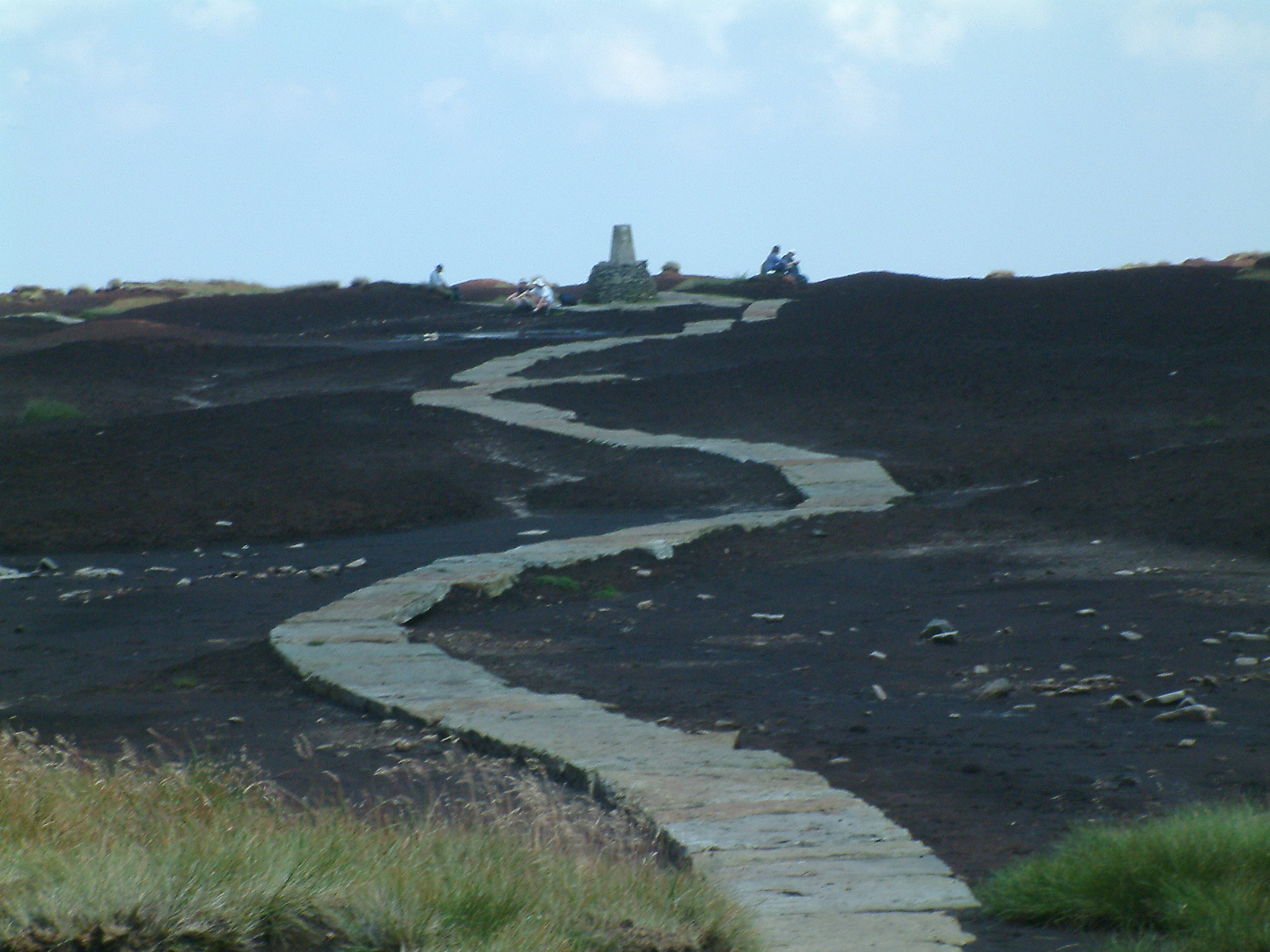
The paved surface of the Pennine Way on Black Hill in the Peak District National Park

Dalton returned to the cabinet in 1948, as Chancellor of the Duchy of Lancaster, making him a minister without portfolio. He became Minister of Town and Country Planning in 1950, the position being renamed as Minister of Local Government and Planning the following year. An avid outdoorsman, he served a term as president of the Ramblers Association, which promoted walking tours. As Chancellor in 1946 he had started the National Land Fund to resource national parks, and in 1951 he approved the Pennine Way, which involved the creation of 70 additional miles of rights of way. He still had the ear of the Prime Minister, and enjoyed promoting the careers of candidates with potential, but was no longer a major political player as he had been until 1947. In October 1950, a group of intellectuals from Communist China led by the writer Liu Ningyi visited Britain, and Dalton along with Bevan were assigned to meet the Chinese delegation. Liu read out a threatening statement saying that China would "not stand aside" from the Korean War and would intervene (in fact, Chinese forces had already crossed the Yalu river into North Korea) and accused the Labour government of being unfriendly towards China. In response, an angry Dalton told Liu that he had not met anyone who represented "real British" opinion and compared his visit, meeting only people associated with the British Communist Party, to a Labour Party delegation in China ruled by the Kuomintang. In November–December 1950, Dalton expressed much concern about the Korean War escalating into a Third World War, arguing that the world was in a highly dangerous situation when China and the United States fighting each other in Korea. Dalton urged Attlee to visit Washington D.C. to meet the American president Harry S. Truman to seek assurances that the United States would not use nuclear weapons and/or seek to escalate the Korean war into an all-out Sino-American war. Attlee visited Washington between 4–8 December 1949 for an emergency summit with Truman and reported that Truman had ruled out the use of nuclear weapons and escalation of the war. In 1951, the writer Monica Felton visited North Korea, China and the Soviet Union. In a radio broadcast from Moscow, she accused American forces of committing Nazi-style crimes in Korea. Upon her return to Britain, Dalton had her sacked from the Ministry of Local Government. He left government after Labour lost the 1951 general election.

=== Later years ===
Dalton lost his place (elected by party members, who in this era were Bevanite in their sympathies) on the Labour National Executive Committee in 1952. Dalton retired from the Shadow Cabinet in 1955, after thirty years as a front-bencher, and stood down from Parliament in the 1959 general election. He was made a Life Peer in 1960, but died two years later on 13 February 1962.

== Personal life ==
In 1914 Dalton married Ruth with whom he had a daughter who died in infancy in the early 1920s.

Dalton's biographer, Ben Pimlott, accepts that Dalton had homosexual tendencies but concludes he never acted on them, stating that "no evidence exists that Dalton ever had a sexual relationship with another man, and his private life seems to have been one of blameless monogamy."

Michael Bloch, on the other hand, thinks that Dalton's love for Rupert Brooke, whom he met at Cambridge University's Fabian Society, went beyond the platonic, citing bike rides in the countryside and sleeping naked under the stars. In 1908, Dalton also made advances at James Strachey, "waving an immense steaming penis in his face and chuckling softly", as Brooke reported to James' brother Lytton.

In later life, Dalton seems to have refrained from sexual relationships with men, though he kept a fatherly interest in the career of various young men (such as Hugh Gaitskell, Richard Crossman and Tony Crosland, who had been noted for their good looks and had had same-sex experiences at Oxford) and was rather touchy-feely with them. In 1951, Dalton wrote to Crossman: "Thinking of Tony, with all his youth and beauty and gaiety and charm... I weep. I am more fond of that young man than I can put into words." According to Nicholas Davenport Dalton's unrequited feelings for Crosland became an embarrassing joke within the Labour Party.

Dalton's papers, including his diaries, are held at the LSE Library. His diaries have been digitised and are available on LSE's Digital Library.

== Awards ==
Dalton was president of the Ramblers' Association from 1948 to 1950, and Master of the Drapers' Company in 1958–59. He was created a life peer as Baron Dalton, of Forest and Frith in the County Palatine of Durham on 28 January 1960.

== Contributions in economics ==
Dalton substantially expanded Max Otto Lorenz's work in the measurement of income inequality, offering both an expanded array of techniques but also a set of principles by which to comprehend shifts in an income distribution, thereby providing a more compelling theoretical basis for understanding relationships between incomes (1920).

Following a suggestion by Pigou (1912, p. 24), Dalton proposed the condition that a transfer of income from a richer to a poorer person, so long as that transfer does not reverse the ranking of the two, will result in greater equity (Dalton, p. 351). This principle has come to be known as the Pigou–Dalton principle (see, e.g., Amartya Sen, 1973).

Dalton offered a theoretical proposition of a positive functional relationship between income and economic welfare, stating that economic welfare increases at an exponentially decreasing rate with increased income, leading to the conclusion that maximum social welfare is achievable only when all incomes are equal.

== Arms ==
Coat of arms of Hugh Dalton
Coronet Coronet of a baron Crest A Griffin or Demi-Dragon issuant Vert wings ouvert Escutcheon Azure semḗe of Cross Crosslets a Lion rampant guardant Or Motto Inter Cruces Triumphans In Cruce

== Cited sources ==
- Aster, Sidney (1973). 1939: the making of the Second World War. New York: Simon and Schuster. ISBN 9780671216894.
- Biber, Dušan (1994). "The Yugoslav Coup d'etat, March 27, 1941". In John Erickson & David Dilks (ed.). Barbarossa The Axis and the Allies. Edinburgh University Press. pp. 34–42. ISBN 9781474468060.
- Bloom, Cecil (March 1999). "The British Labour Party and Palestine, 1917—1948". Jewish Historical Studies. 36 (1): 141–171.
- Buchanan, Tom (2012). East Wind China and the British Left, 1925–1976. Oxford: Oxford University Press. ISBN 9780199570331.
- Cairns, John (1976). "De Gaulle". In Peter Dennis & Adrian Preston (ed.). Soldiers as Statesmen. London: Routledge. pp. 135–176. ISBN 0367569906.
- Callaghan, John (2007). The Labour Party and Foreign Policy A History. London: Taylor & Francis. ISBN 9781134540167.
- Charman, Terry (2010). The Day We Went to War. London: Ebury Publishing. ISBN 9780753537787.
- Charman, Terry (2013). "Hugh Dalton, Poland and SOE, 1940-1942". In Mark Seaman (ed.). Special Operations Executive A New Instrument of War. London: Taylor & Francis. pp. 61–70. ISBN 9781134175246.
- Colton, Joel (1966). Leon Blum: Humanist in Politics. Knopf Doubleday Publishing Group. ISBN 978-0-307-83089-0. LCCN 65-18768. OCLC 265833.
- Frank, Matthew (2008). Expelling the Germans British Opinion and Post-1945 Population Transfer in Context. Oxford: Oxford University Press. ISBN 9780191528477.
- Gerolymatos, André (2018). The British and the Greek Resistance, 1936–1944 Spies, Saboteurs, and Partisans. Lanham: Lexington Books. ISBN 9781498564090.
- Gorny, Joseph (2013). The British Labour Movement and Zionism, 1917-1948. London: Taylor & Francis. ISBN 9781135169336.
- Grantham, John T. (October 1979). "Hugh Dalton and the International Post-War Settlement: Labour Party Foreign Policy Formulation, 1943-44". Journal of Contemporary History. 14 (4): 713–729. doi:10.1177/002200947901400408.
- Heyck, Thomas (2019). A History of the Peoples of the British Isles From 1870 to the Present. London: Taylor & Francis. ISBN 9781134415137.
- Hionidou, Violetta (2006). Famine and Death in Occupied Greece, 1941-1944. Cambridge: Cambridge University Press. ISBN 9781107405431.
- Irwin, Douglas; Mavroidis, Petros; Sykes, Alan (2008). The Genesis of the GATT. Cambridge: Cambridge University Press. ISBN 9781139471343.
- Jefferys, Kevin (1995). The Churchill Coalition and Wartime Politics, 1940-1945. Manchester: Publisher:Manchester University Press. ISBN 9780719025600.
- Keene, Thomas (2012). Cloak of Enemies Churchill's SOE, Enemies at Home and the Cockleshell Heroes. Cheltenham: History Press. ISBN 9780752483757.
- Marwick, Arthur (2007). A History of Human Beauty. London: Bloomsbury Publishing. ISBN 9780826439451.
- Mangold, Peter (2011). Britain and the Defeated French From Occupation to Liberation, 1940-1944. London: I.B.Tauris. ISBN 9780857720702.
- Milazzo, Matteo (1975). The Chetnik Movement and the Yugoslav Resistance. 9781421433400. ISBN 9781421433400.
- Owen, Nicholas (2007). The British Left and India Metropolitan Anti-Imperialism, 1885-1947. Oxford: Oxford University Press. ISBN 9780199233014.
- Pimlott, Ben (1985). Hugh Dalton. Macmillan. ISBN 9780333412510. online
- Politakis, George (2017). The Post-War Reconstruction of Greece A History of Economic Stabilization and Development, 1944-1952. New York: Palgrave Macmillan US. ISBN 9781137577344.
- Porch, Douglas (2024). Resistance and Liberation France at War, 1942-1945. Cambridge: Cambridge University Press. ISBN 9781009204569.
- Pugh, Martin (2010). Speak for Britain! A New History of the Labour Party. New York: Random House. ISBN 9781407051550.
- Roberts, Walter (1973). Tito, Mihailović, and the Allies, 1941-1945. New Brunswick: Rutgers University Press. ISBN 9780813507408.
- Seaman, Mark (2018). ""The Most Difficult Country": Some Practical Considerations On British Support for Clandestine Operations in Czechoslovakia during the Second World War". In Vit Smetana & Kathleen Brenda Geaney (ed.). Exile in London The Experience of Czechoslovakia and the Other Occupied Nations, 1939–1945. Prague: Charles University Press. pp. 122–132. ISBN 9788024637013.
- Singleton, Frederick Bernard (1985). A short history of the Yugoslav peoples. Cambridge: Cambridge University Press. ISBN 9780521274852.
- Shaw, Louise Grace (2013). The British Political Elite and the Soviet Union. London: Taylor & Francis. ISBN 9781135761271.
- Smetana, Vít (2008). In the Shadow of Munich British Policy Towards Czechslovakia from the Endorsement to the Renunciation of the Munich Agreement (1938-1942). Prague: Charles University Press. ISBN 9788024613734.
- Stafford, David (2013). "Churchill and SOE". In Mark Seaman (ed.). Special Operations Executive A New Instrument of War. London: Taylor & Francis. pp. 47–60. ISBN 9781134175246.
- Temple, Richard (2024). Taken as Red, Highs and Lows of the Labour Party, 1924-201. Newcastle upon Tyne: Cambridge Scholars Publishing. ISBN 9781036407193.
- Tombs, Robert (2013). ""Two Great Peoples"". In Robert Tombs & Emile Chabal (ed.). Britain and France in Two World Wars Truth, Myth and Memory. London: Bloomsbury. pp. 1–16. ISBN 9781441130396.
- Trew, Stephen (2018). Britain, Mihailovic and the Chetniks, 1941-42. London: Palgrave Macmillan. ISBN 9780230389762.
- Tuck-Hong Tang, James (1992). Britain's Encounter with Revolutionary China, 1949–54. London: Tuck-Hong Tang. ISBN 9781349223497.
- Watt, D.C. (1989). How War Came The Immediate Origins of the Second World War, 1938-1939. London: Heinmann.
- Wieviorka, Olivier (2016). The French Resistance. Cambridge: Harvard University Press. ISBN 9780674731226.
- Wieviorka, Olivier (2019). The Resistance in Western Europe, 1940-1945. New York: Columbia University Press. ISBN 9780231548649.
- Williams, Heather (2003). Parachutes, Patriots and Partisans The Special Operations Executive and Yugoslavia, 1941-1945. Madison: University of Wisconsin Press. ISBN 9780299194949.
- Bennett Woods, Randall (1990). A Changing of the Guard Anglo-American Relations, 1941-1946. Raleigh: University of North Carolina Press. ISBN 9780807818770.

Parliament of the United Kingdom
Preceded by Collingwood Hughes	Member of Parliament for Peckham; 1924–1929	Succeeded by John Beckett
Preceded by Ruth Dalton	Member of Parliament for Bishop Auckland; 1929–1931	Succeeded by Aaron Curry
Preceded by Aaron Curry	Member of Parliament for Bishop Auckland; 1935–1959	Succeeded by James Boyden
Political offices
Preceded by Godfrey Locker-Lampson	Under-Secretary of State for Foreign Affairs; 1929–1931	Succeeded by Anthony Eden
Preceded by Ronald Cross	Minister of Economic Warfare; 1940–1942	Succeeded by The Earl of Selborne
Preceded by John Llewellin	President of the Board of Trade; 1942–1945	Succeeded by Oliver Lyttelton
Preceded by Sir John Anderson	Chancellor of the Exchequer; 1945–1947	Succeeded by Stafford Cripps
Preceded by The Lord Pakenham	Chancellor of the Duchy of Lancaster; 1948–1950	Succeeded by The Viscount Alexander of Hillsborough
Party political offices
Preceded by Jennie Adamson	Chair of the Labour Party; 1936–1937	Succeeded by George Dallas
