= Stanley Palmer =

American historian

Stanley H. Palmer is an American retired professor of history at the University of Texas at Arlington (UTA) specializing in Modern British and Irish history, the history of the British Empire, and comparative police history.

Palmer has helped develop the school's "Transatlantic History" Ph.D. program, which began in 1998. The program focuses on the study of the interrelations and interactions between and among Europe, Africa, and the Americas, looking at "transnational," cross-cultural, and non-traditional links. Palmer has been a UTA professor since 1973 and chaired the history department in 1982-87 and 1995-96.

Palmer received his B.A. degree from Brown University in 1966 and his Ph.D. from Harvard University in 1973 where he studied under Professor David S. Landes. He is the son of R. R. Palmer, a noted historian, and Esther Howard. He is married with four children.

Palmer is well known among his students as a teacher who employs unique techniques to engage students in the "story" of history - using role-playing or a "time-machine." He also has a well-developed sense of humor, which has earned him the title, among his students, of, the "Earl of University Hall."

== Selected works ==
- “The Power of Numbers: Settler and Native in Ireland, America, and South Africa, 1600-1900." Transatlantic History. Steven Reinhardt and D. Reinhartz, eds. College Station, TX : Texas A&M University, 2006. 85-194. ISBN 1-58544-486-3
- Police and Protest in England and Ireland 1780-1850. Cambridge, England : Cambridge University, 1988. ISBN 0-521-30216-1.
- Essays on the History of North American Discovery and Exploration [co-editor]. College Station : Texas A&M University, c1988. ISBN 0-89096-373-8
- Essays on Frontiers in World History [co-editor]. Austin : University of Texas, 1981. ISBN 0-292-72033-5
- Economic Arithmetic : A Guide to the Statistical Sources of English Commerce, Industry, and Finance, 1700-1850. New York : Garland, 1977. ISBN 0-8240-9946-X

== Awards ==
- Member of the UT Arlington Academy of Distinguished Teachers
- 2001 National Academic Advising Association (NACADA) Outstanding Adviser Award winner.
- UTA University Award for Outstanding Research Achievement, 1989.
- President of the Western Conference on British Studies, [date unknown]
- Fellow, Wilson Center for Scholars, [1981]
