= Joel Colton =

American historian

- Born: Joel George Colton (Joseph Goldstein); August 23, 1918; Bronx, New York, US
- Died: April 17, 2011 (aged 92); Durham, North Carolina, US
- Education: City University of New York; Columbia University; Columbia University
- Spouse: Shirley Colton (?-2003, two children)
- Scientific career
- Fields: history
- Workplaces: Duke University; Rockefeller Foundation

Joel G. Colton (born Joseph Goldstein; August 23, 1918 – April 17, 2011) of Durham, North Carolina, was a modern history scholar and author.

Colton received his B.A. in history from City College in 1939 and his M.A. from Columbia University in 1940. After serving in the U.S. Army during World War II, he returned to Columbia, from which he received his Ph.D. in 1950. He taught at Duke University from 1947 until his retirement in 1982, except while serving as director of humanities at the Rockefeller Foundation between 1974 and 1982.

His contributions to R.R. Palmer's A History of the Modern World, is a classic. In 2002, it was reported that "First published in 1950, it has been translated into six languages and is used in more than 1,000 colleges and universities as well as many high school advanced placement courses." By 2011, the book had been translated into 10 languages.(Slotnick's Colton obit) Since its original publication, its reputation continued to grow. "In 1987, The New York Times put it on its list of the 19 classic textbooks of all time, in all disciplines. The Washington Post in 1996 called it 'the first book to be elevated to the textbook hall of fame'"

He died of congestive heart failure.

== Major publications ==
- A History of the Modern World (2nd - 9th editions). NY: McGraw-Hill, 9th edition.
- Léon Blum: Humanist in Politics. Durham, NC: Duke University Press, 1987.
- Twentieth Century. Amsterdam: Time-Life Books, 1969.
- Compulsory Labor Arbitration in France, 1936-1939. NY: Kings Crown Press, 1951.
