= A History of the Modern World =

1950 history book

- Title page for A History of the Modern World (1961)
- Author: Robert Roswell Palmer
- Genre: History
- Publication date: 1950

A History of the Modern World is a work initially published by the distinguished American historian at Princeton and Yale universities Robert Roswell Palmer in 1950. The work has since been extended by Joel Colton (from its second edition, 1956) and Lloyd S. Kramer (from its ninth edition, 2001), and currently counts 12 editions. First published in 1950, and translated into six languages, the book is used in more than 1,000 colleges and universities, as well as many high school advanced placement courses.

The second edition (1956), comprises two volumes, 20 main chapters and 110 sub-chapters. The author focuses on World History from a European perspective, and the newer editions also exists under the title "A History of Europe in the Modern World".

== Content (second edition) ==
Content of the second edition, Note: Swedish translation re-translated. Although this double translation may differ in some words or formulations, from the American English original, this illustrates the content and structure of R.R. Palmer's work.

=== First book ===
The Ancient Greece to 1848

- Chapter 1 - Birth of Europe

1. Ancient Greece, Rome and Christianity, p. 3
2. Early Middle Ages, Forming of Europe, p. 10
3. High Middle Ages, Profane culture, p. 18
4. High Middle Ages, the Church, p. 29

- Chapter 2 - The Upheaval within the Christian Church 1300 - 1560

5. Decay of the Church, p. 39
6. The Renaissance in Italy, p. 44
7. The Renaissance outside Italy, p. 52
8. The new Monarchies, p. 54
9. Protestantism, p. 60
10. Catholic reformation and restructure, p. 73

- Chapter 3 - The Religious Wars 1560 - 1648

11. Opening of the Atlantic Ocean, p. 81
12. The Commercial Revolution, p. 85
13. The Spanish Inquisition; the Dutch and the English, p. 95
14. France's decomposition and reconstruction, p. 104
15. The thirty-year war; Germany's decay, p. 111

- Chapter 4 - Western Europe in Leadership Position

16. The Great Monarch and the Balance in Europe, p. 121
17. The Dutch Republic, p. 124
18. England: the Puritan Republic, p. 129
19. England: the Triumph of the Parliament, p. 136
20. Louis XIV's France 1643-1715; the Triumph of Absolutism, p. 142
21. Louis XIV's War; Treaty of Utrecht, p. 152

- Chapter 5 - Transformation of Eastern Europe 1648 - 1740

22. Three aging values, p. 159
23. Arising of the Austrian Monarchy, p. 170
24. Origin of Prussia, p. 175
25. Russia's Transforming into Western Values, p. 175
26. Poland's divisions, p. 195

- Chapter 6 - The Struggle for Wealth and Power

27. The World's Housekeeping during the 18th Century, p. 200
28. Western Europe after Utrecht, p. 209
29. The Big War in the middle of the 18th Century, p. 219

- Chapter 7 - The Scientific perspective of the World

30. The Prophets of Scientific Culture - Bacon and Descartes, p. 234
31. The Road to Newton: Law of Gravitation, p. 239
32. Expanded Knowledge of the Human Being and Society, p. 247
33. Political Theory: the Natural Law School, p. 254

- Chapter 8 - Age of Enlightenment

34. "The Philosophers", p. 261
35. Enlightened Despotism, France, Austria, Prussia, p. 272
36. Enlightened Despotism, Russia, p. 282
37. The American Revolution, p. 289

- Chapter 9 - The French Revolution

38. Preconditions, p. 303
39. The Revolution 1789, p. 307
40. The French Unity, p. 315
41. The Revolution and Europe: The War and the "second" revolution 1792, p. 320
42. The French Remodeling of Society, p. 315
43. Republican Crisis 1792-95: Reign of Terror, p. 325
44. The Despotic Republic 1799-1804, p. 337

- Chapter 10 - The Napoleonic Europe

45. The Creation of the French Empire, p. 345
46. The large Empire: the Propagation of the Revolution, p. 354
47. The Continental System: Britain and Europe, p. 359
48. The National Movements: Germany, p. 364
49. Napoleon defeated: The Vienna Congress, p. 372

- Chapter 11 - Reaction versus progress 1815 - 1848

50. The Industrial Revolution, p. 384
51. Origin of the new Ideologies, p. 391
52. The Dam of the River: Domestic Politics, p. 403
53. The Breakthrough of Liberalism in the West: The Revolutions 1830-32, p. 413
54. The triumph of Western Bourgeois, p. 423

=== Second book ===
The 1848 Revolutions to the Second World War and its aftermath

- Chapter 12 - 1848: An interrupted Revolution

56: Paris: the Ghost of Western Social Revolutions, p. 2
57: Vienna: the National Revolution in Central Europe, p. 9
58: Frankfurt and Berlin: the Question of a Liberal Europe, p. 17
59: The Consequences of the 1848 Revolutions: the hard Objectivity, p. 24
60: Birth of Marxism, p. 27
61: Bonaparteism: The Second French Empire 1852-70, p. 33

- Chapter 13 - Consolidation of the large Countries

62: Background: the idea of National States, p. 39
63: Cavour and the Italian War 1859: Italy's Unification, p. 42
64: Bismarck: the Foundation of the German Empire, p. 47
65: The Double Monarchy Austria-Hungary, p. 56
66: Liberalisation of Tsar-Russia: Alexander II, p. 60
67: United States: The Civil War, p. 65
68: Dominion Canada 1867, p. 71
69: Japan versus the West, p. 74

- Chapter 14 - The European Civilization 1871-1914

70: "The Civilized World", p. 82
71: Demographic Basics: The Growth of the European Population, p. 84
72: The World's Housekeeping during the 19th Century, p. 92
73: Democracy's progress: Third French Republic, United Kingdom of Great Britain and Ireland, German Empire, p. 100
74: Democracy's progress: Socialism and Worker's Unions, p. 112
75: Science, Philosophy and Religion, p. 119
76: The Extinction of Classic Liberalism, p. 129

- Chapter 15 - The European World Domination

77: Imperialism: its Nature and Reasons, p. 137
78: America, p. 144
79: The Dissolution of the Ottoman Empire, p. 149
80: Africa's division, p. 157
81: Imperialism in Asia: the Dutch, the British and the Russians, p. 164
82: Imperialism in Asia: China and the West, p. 168
83: The Russian-Japanese war, p. 172

- Chapter 16 - World War One

84: The International Anarchy, p. 175
85: The Battle of Marne and the new Countenance of the War, p. 184
86: Stalemate 1915-1916, the Navy, the Army, Diplomacy, p. 186
87: The Russian Collapse and the United States' intervention, p. 194
88: The Collapse of the Austrian and German Empires, p. 200
89: The War's Economical and Social Effects, p. 202
90: The Peace in Paris 1919, p. 206

- Chapter 17 - The Russian Revolution

91: Background, p. 216
92: The 1905 Revolution, p. 224
93: The 1917 Revolution, p. 229
94: The Union of the Socialist Soviet Republics, p. 237
95: Stalin: the Five Year Plans and the Cleansings, p. 244
96: The International Effects of Communism, p. 254

- Chapter 18 - The apparent victory of democracy

97: Democracy's advancement and the New Deal, p. 260
98: The German Republic and the Spirit of Locarno, p. 265
99: Asia's Revolt, p. 272
100: The Great Depression: Collapse of the World's Housekeeping, p. 284

- Chapter 19 - Democracy and Dictatorship

101: The United States: Depression and the New Deal, p. 292
102: Stress and Adaptation for the British and French Democracies, p. 297
103: Totalitarianism: The Italian Fascism, p. 306
104: Totalitarianism: Germany's Third Reich, p. 311
105: Weakness of the West: Against a New War, p. 323

- Chapter 20 - The Earthquake: The Second World War and its Aftermath

106: The Axis Powers' Triumphs, p. 333
107: The Western Powers' and Soviet Union's Victories, p. 341
108: Restructure and Revolution in Europe and Asia after the War, p. 349
109: The Democracies After 1945, p. 358
110: Two Worlds at Conflict, p. 368

== ISBN of later editions ==
- 10th and 13th edition: ISBN 978-0375413988
