= Ruth Dalton =

British politician (1890-1966)

The Right Honourable The Lady Dalton

Member of Parliament for Bishop Auckland
- In office 7 February 1929 – 10 May 1929
- Preceded by: Ben Spoor
- Succeeded by: Hugh Dalton
- Majority: 7,072 (27.2%)

Personal details
- Born: Florence Ruth Hamilton Fox; 9 March 1890 Oak House, Farnborough, England
- Died: 15 March 1966 (aged 76) London, England
- Party: Labour
- Spouse: Hugh Dalton (m. 1914; died 1962)
- Education: London School of Economics

Florence Ruth Dalton, Baroness Dalton (née Hamilton Fox; 9 March 1890 – 15 March 1966) was a British Labour Party politician. A long serving member of the London County Council, she holds the record for being one of the two shortest-serving female Members of Parliament (MP).

== Career ==
A graduate of the London School of Economics, she married Hugh Dalton, later a Labour Party Member of Parliament, in 1914; they had one child, a daughter. The family lived at West Leaze, Aldbourne, Wiltshire and at Carlisle Mansions, Carlisle Place, London.

In 1925 she was elected a member of the London County Council.

Her husband was MP for Peckham in South London, later a solidly Labour seat, but then highly marginal; his majority in 1924 was only 947 votes. He had been selected as Labour candidate for the safe seat of Bishop Auckland in County Durham, where the sitting MP Ben Spoor was retiring, but Spoor died shortly before Christmas 1928, necessitating a by-election. However, Hugh Dalton could not stand without resigning his Peckham seat, and the candidate selected to succeed him in Peckham was John Beckett, then MP for Gateshead, so Hugh Dalton could not stand without triggering another two by-elections.

The Bishop Auckland Constituency Labour Party therefore needed a candidate who would agree to stand down at the next general election. The seventy-strong general committee unanimously chose Ruth Dalton, because she could be relied on to make way for her husband as soon as Parliament was dissolved; no other candidate was even considered.

Ruth Dalton duly won the by-election on 7 February with a large majority, receiving 57% of the votes cast, and served until Parliament was dissolved on 10 May for the 1929 general election. She had thus been a Member of Parliament for only 92 days, a record for a female MP. It was equalled 45 years later by Margo MacDonald, the Scottish National Party MP for Glasgow Govan from 8 November 1973 to 8 February 1974.

Dalton did not enjoy the House of Commons, and as agreed did not stand for Parliament again. She felt that more work was accomplished on London County Council, where she held her seat as an elected member until 1931, then returning from 1935 to 1942 as an alderman, including a period as Chairman of the Parks Committee. She later served on the Board of Governors of the Royal Ballet and from 1957 to 1962 was on the Arts Council.

Her husband was made a life peer in 1960, and she was then known as Lady Dalton.

== See also ==
- List of United Kingdom MPs with the shortest service

Parliament of the United Kingdom
| Preceded by Ben Spoor | Member of Parliament for Bishop Auckland; Feb. 1929–May 1929 | Succeeded by Hugh Dalton |
