= Robert Roswell Palmer =

American historian (1909–2002)

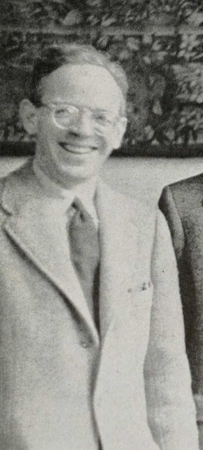
- Palmer, circa 1953

Dean of Arts and Sciences at Washington University in St. Louis
- In office 1963–1966

Personal details
- Born: January 11, 1909 Chicago, Illinois, U.S.
- Died: June 11, 2002 (aged 93) Newtown, Bucks County, Pennsylvania
- Spouse: Esther Howard (m. 1942)
- Children: 3 (incl. Stanley)
- Education: University of Chicago; Cornell University
- Awards: Bancroft Prize

Robert Roswell Palmer (January 11, 1909 – June 11, 2002) was an American historian. Specializing in eighteenth-century France, he is best known for The Age of the Democratic Revolution: A Political History of Europe and America, 1760–1800 (1959 and 1964), which examined the Atlantic Revolutions, an age of democratic revolution that swept Europe and the Americas between 1760 and 1800. He was awarded the Bancroft Prize in History for the first volume. Palmer also achieved distinction as a history text writer.

== Life ==
Born in Chicago, Illinois, Palmer accelerated through the public schools. By winning a citywide contest for a play written in Latin, he earned a full scholarship to the University of Chicago where he studied with the historian Louis Gottschalk and earned his bachelor's degree (Ph.B.) in 1931. He received his Ph.D. in History from Cornell University three years later, studying with Carl L. Becker. His dissertation was The French Idea of American Independence on the Eve of the French Revolution – "published/created" 1934.

Palmer began teaching at Princeton University as an instructor in 1936, and worked there for nearly three decades, becoming a full professor. He was dean of arts and sciences (1963–1966) at Washington University in St. Louis, then returned to teaching and writing at Yale University, where he retired as professor emeritus. Palmer had visiting professorships at numerous universities, including Berkeley, Chicago, Colorado and Michigan. After retiring in 1977, he returned to Princeton as a guest scholar at its Institute for Advanced Study.

Palmer married Esther Howard in 1942, and they had three children and four grandchildren. His son, the historian Stanley Palmer, is a professor of history at the University of Texas at Arlington. After R.R. Palmer's death in 2002 at Newtown, Bucks County, Pennsylvania, a memorial service was held at Princeton Chapel.

== Work ==
In 1950 Palmer published A History of the Modern World, which is in its eleventh edition as of 2013. (Joel Colton is a co-author from 1956 the 2nd edition, and Lloyd Kramer is coauthor from 2002, the 9th ed.) The text has been translated into six languages and is used in more than 1000 colleges and many AP European History high school courses. It is notable for its clear, essay-like writing style. Palmer's introduction covers the period from the earliest signs of human civilization to 1300 CE. The main body of the text covers events from the Black Death to the Fall of the Soviet Union in European history. The book is organized partly by ideas: for example, the relation of the French Revolution to modern and ancient thought may be mentioned before the French Revolution.

Palmer's most important work of historical scholarship is The Age of the Democratic Revolution: A Political History of Europe and America, 1760–1800. It was published by Princeton in two volumes: The Challenge (1959), which won the Bancroft Prize in American History, and The Struggle (1964). Palmer's masterwork traced the growth of two competing forces – ideas of democracy and equality, on the one hand, and the growing power of aristocracies in society, on the other – and the results of the collision between these forces, including both the American Revolution and the French Revolution. Thus it foreshadowed the development of "comparative Atlantic history" as a field. It remains a valuable resource for scholars. In 1971 Palmer published a slightly revised and condensed version of the second volume as The World of the French Revolution.

The 1941 monograph Twelve Who Ruled is also noteworthy. It has been in print since its first edition, was reissued with a new preface in 1989 for the French Revolution bicentennial, and was reissued as a Princeton Classic in 2005 as part of the University Press centennial celebration. The book is a fusion of history and collective biography, focusing on the members of the Committee of Public Safety and their efforts to guide France during the Terror following their Revolution. Columbia University history professor Isser Woloch, a specialist in the Revolutionary and Napoleonic eras, has stated that Twelve Who Ruled "may be the best book on the French Revolution written by an American."

== Selected works ==
- The French Idea of American Independence on the Eve of the French Revolution (Cornell Univ. PhD dissertation) – "published/created" 1934
- Catholics and Unbelievers in Eighteenth Century France (Princeton University Press, 1939)
- Twelve Who Ruled: the Committee of Public Safety, during the Terror (Princeton, 1941; Bicentennial ed. with a new preface, 1989)
- The Procurement and Training of Ground Combat Troops, by Palmer, Bell I. Wiley and William R. Keast (Department of the Army, 1948) – about the U.S. Army, 1939–1945
- A History of the Modern World (Alfred A. Knopf, 1950); 11th ed. by Palmer, Joel Colton, and Lloyd Kramer (McGraw-Hill, 2013)
- The Age of the Democratic Revolution: A Political History of Europe and America, 1760–1800 (Princeton, vol. 1, 1959; vol. 2, 1964); one-volume edition, with new introduction by David Armitage, 2014; online edition vols. 1–2; online free
- The World of the French Revolution (Allen & Unwin, 1971) – shorter and less scholarly treatment of The Age, vol. 2
- The Improvement of Humanity: Education and the French Revolution (Princeton, 1985)

Translations

- Georges Lefebvre, The Coming of the French Revolution, 1789 (Princeton, 1947) [orig. 1939]
- The School of the French Revolution: a documentary history of the College of Louis-le-Grand and its director, Jean-François Champagne, 1762–1814 (Princeton, 1975), edited and transl. by Palmer
- Louis Bergeron, France Under Napoleon (Princeton, 1981) [orig. 1972]
- The Two Tocquevilles, Father and Son: Hervé and Alexis de Tocqueville on the coming of the French Revolution (Princeton, 1987), ed. and transl. by Palmer
- Jean-Paul Bertaud, The Army of the French Revolution: from citizen-soldiers to instrument of power (Princeton, 1988) [orig. 1979]
- From Jacobin to Liberal: Marc-Antoine Jullien, 1775–1848 (Princeton, 1993), selected and transl. with commentary by Palmer
- Jean Baptiste Say, An Economist in Troubled Times: writings (Princeton, 1997), selected and transl. by Palmer

Historical atlas

- Atlas of World History (Rand McNally, 1957; Revised ed., 1965)

From 1983 the [Rand McNally] Atlas of World History, general editor R. I. Moore, is based on The Hamlyn Historical Atlas (Hamlyn, 1981).

== Honors and awards ==
- 1958, elected to the American Academy of Arts and Sciences
- 1959, elected to the American Philosophical Society
- 1960, Bancroft Award in History, American Council of Learned Societies Special Prize
- 1961, served as president of the Society for French Historical Studies
- 1970, president of the American Historical Association
- 1990, Antonio Feltrinelli International Prize for History in Rome
- Honorary degrees awarded by the universities of Uppsala and Toulouse
