= 1926 Wallsend by-election =

UK Parliamentary by-election

The 1926 Wallsend by-election was held on 21 July 1926. The by-election was held due to the resignation of the incumbent Labour MP, Patrick Hastings. It was won by the Labour candidate Margaret Bondfield.

Wallsend by-election, 1926
Party	Candidate	Votes	%	±%
Labour	Margaret Bondfield	18,866	57.7	+5.3
Unionist	Sam Howard	9,839	30.1	−17.5
Liberal	Aaron Curry	4,000	12.2	New
Majority		9,027	27.6	+22.8
Turnout		32,705	82.9	−2.5
Registered electors		39,460		
Labour hold		Swing	+11.4	
